= Lehideux =

Lehideux is a French surname that may refer to

- Bernard Lehideux (born 1944), French politician, nephew of François
- François Lehideux (1904–1998), French industrialist and politician
  - Lehideux and Isorni v France, a 1998 case heard by the European Court of Human Rights
- Martine Lehideux (born 1933), French politician, niece of François, sister of Bernard
