= Barnaud =

Barnaud is a French surname. Notable people with the surname include:

- Jacques Barnaud (1893–1962), French banker, businessman, and politician
- Léon Barnaud (1845–1909), French naval officer
- Nicolas Barnaud (1538–1604), French writer, physician, and alchemist
