= Nationalist revolution =

Nationalist revolution may refer to:

- The Revolutions of 1848 in Europe, which included many nationalist revolts
- The Xinhai Revolution of China in 1911, which overthrew the Emperor of China
- The Northern Expedition of China in 1928, when the Kuomintang took power
- The Révolution nationale in France in the 1940s, the ideological program of Vichy France
- The Indonesian National Revolution in 1945–1949, the Indonesian War of Independence
