= Marcel Renault =

French industrialist (1872–1903)

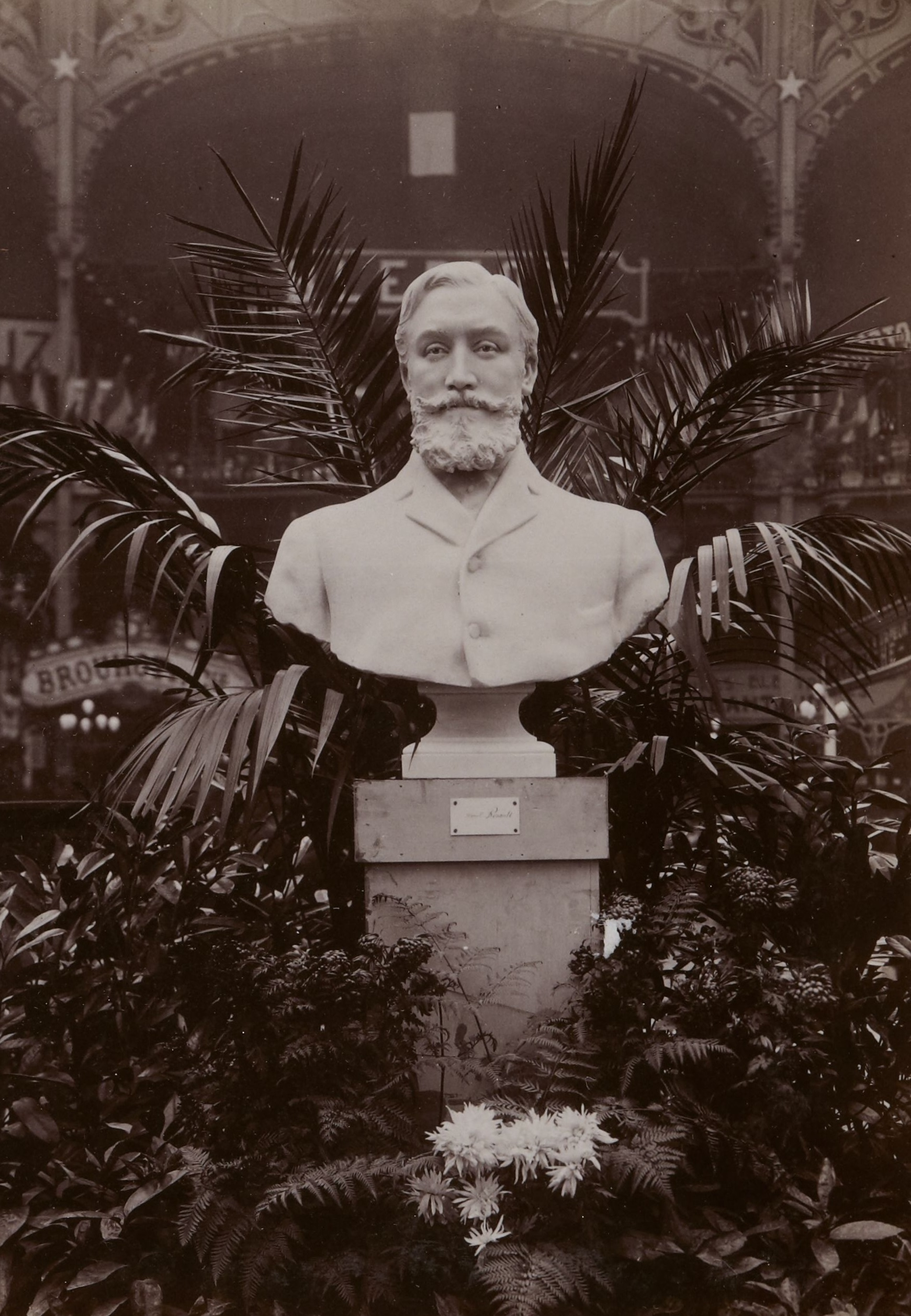
- Bust of Marcel Renault at the 6th Motor Show, Grand-Palais, 10–25 December 1903 (subsequently installed in Billancourt).
- Born: 14 May 1872; Paris, France
- Died: 26 May 1903 (aged 31); Payré, France
- Resting place: Passy Cemetery, France
- Father: Alfred Renault
- Relatives: Fernand Renault (brother); Louis Renault (brother)

Marcel Renault (14 May 1872 – 26 May 1903) was a French racing driver and industrialist, co-inheritor of an important textile business and co-founder of the carmaker Renault with his brothers Louis and Fernand Renault. He died at 31 years old due to injuries from the Paris–Madrid race of 1903.

== Biography ==
=== Early life ===
Renault was born in 1872 in Paris to a bourgeoisie family of five children (two sisters and two brothers). His father, Alfred Renault, gained a fortune from his textile business, and his mother was the daughter of wealthy merchants.

His brother Louis was a mechanical genius. An automotive pioneer, he developed a voiturette in the family workshop in Boulogne-Billancourt in 1898.

=== Foundation of Renault Frères ===
In 1899, while he managed his father's textile business with his brother Fernand, the three brothers founded "Renault Frères" ("Renault Brothers," later becoming Renault Group) in Boulogne-Billancourt. Marcel and Fernand both employed 60 people to launch the car designed by Louis, without believing in the project. Marcel was in charge of the administration, Fernand directing marketing, and Louis devoted to the design and production of the cars. By the end of 1899, they had their first orders.

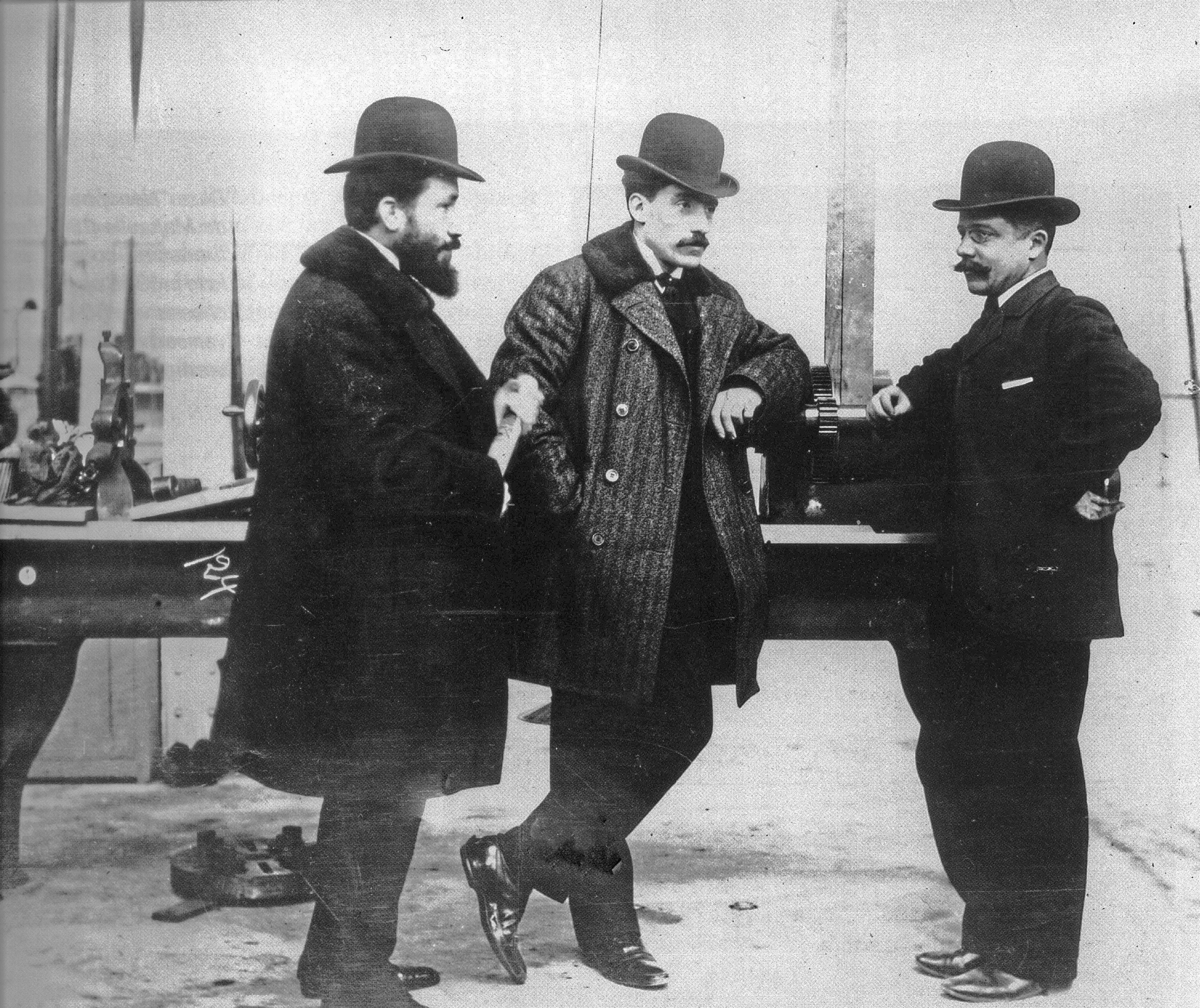
The three Renault brothers: Marcel, Louis and Fernand.

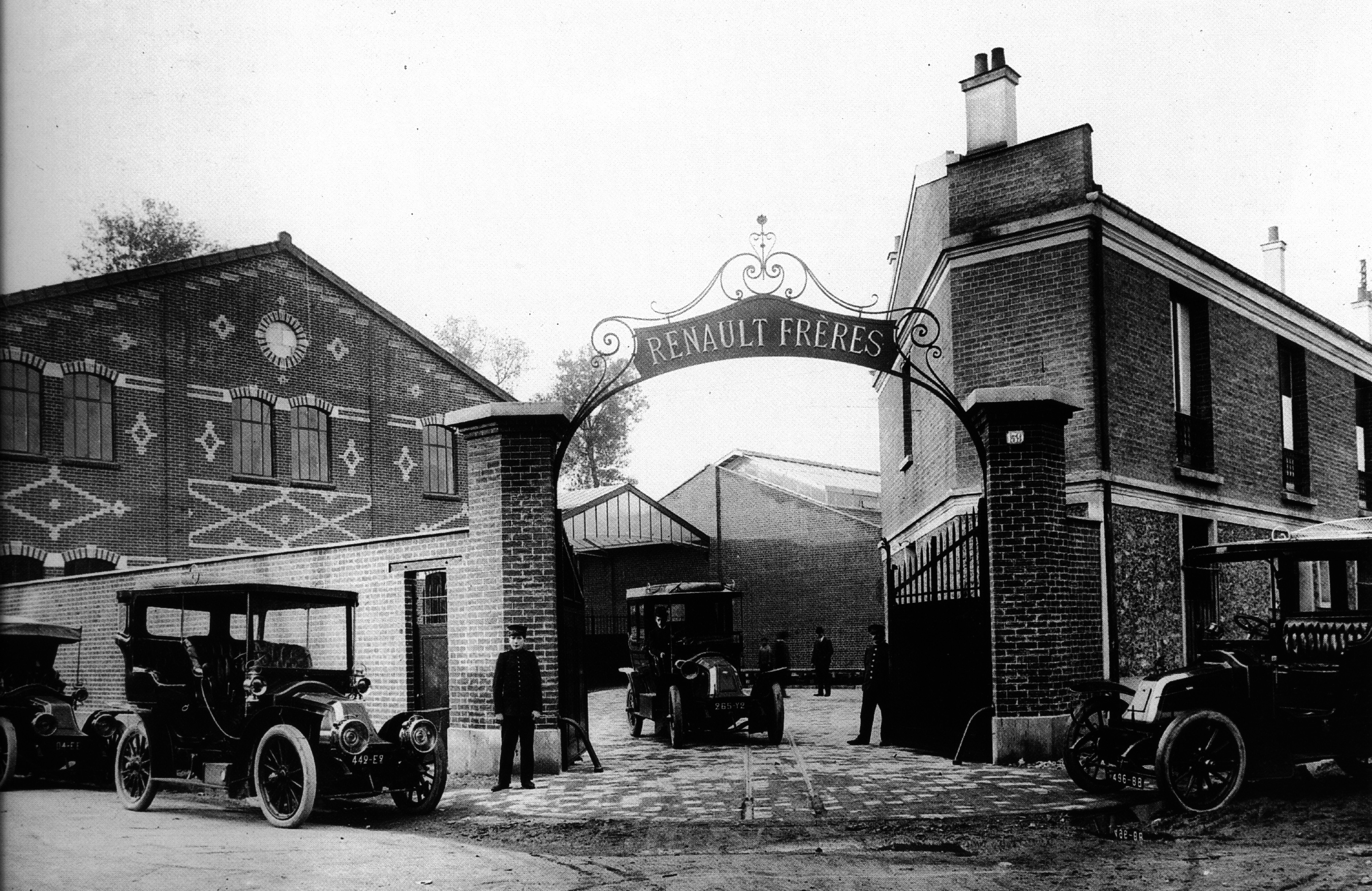
The Renault Frères factory at the start of the 20th century.

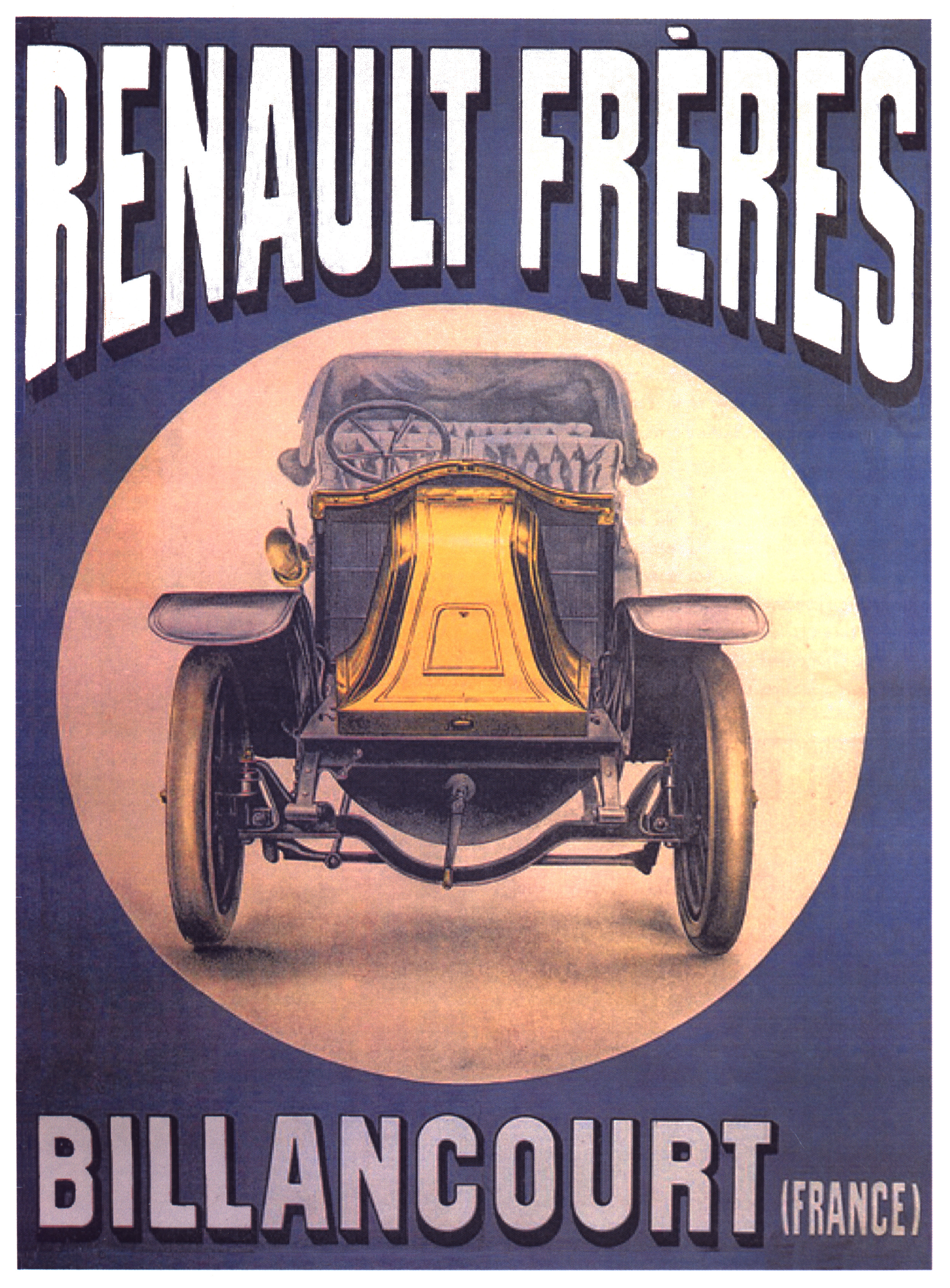
Advertisement for a Renault Frères car.

=== Automotive racing ===
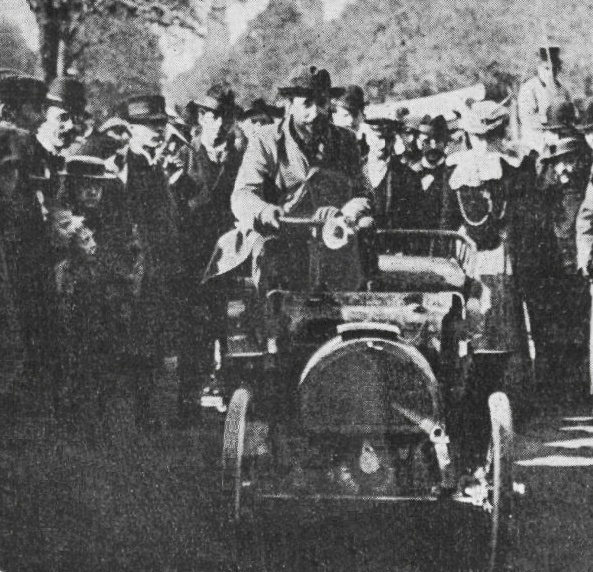
Marcel Renault, third in Paris-Rambouillet 1899, in a Renault voiturette.

In August 1899, Marcel and Louis lined up at the start of the Paris-Trouville race and obtained his first voiturette victory in a series of courses held from city to city known as Coupe des Chauffeurs Amateurs (Amateur Driver's Cup). In their category, the Renaults faced no major rivals, and the brothers won several races in the following years. Their repeated success made their brand famous, causing orders to reach prices as much as 3,000 Gold Francs.

Marcel and Louis participated in the Paris-Toulouse-Paris race during the 1900 Summer Olympics, but Marcel did not finish the race. The two brothers dominated the category of voiturettes (under 400 kg) at the Sports de l'Exposition Universelle de 1900 (1900 Universal Sports Exposition). Together they obtained a silver medal in voiturettes and a prize of 4,000 francs, as well as a gold plaque.

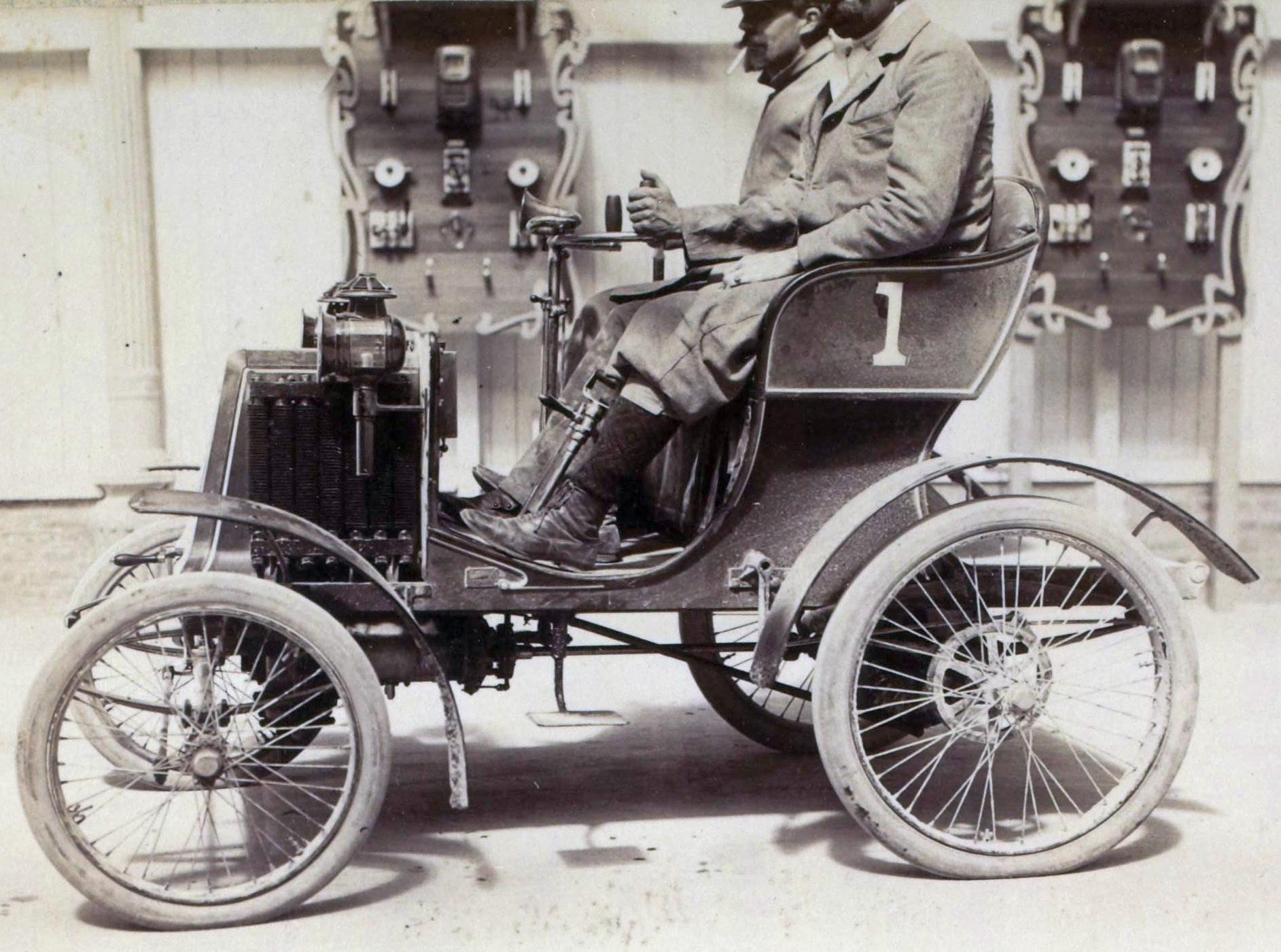
Renault, first registered in the Coupe des Voiturettes on 11 March 1900.

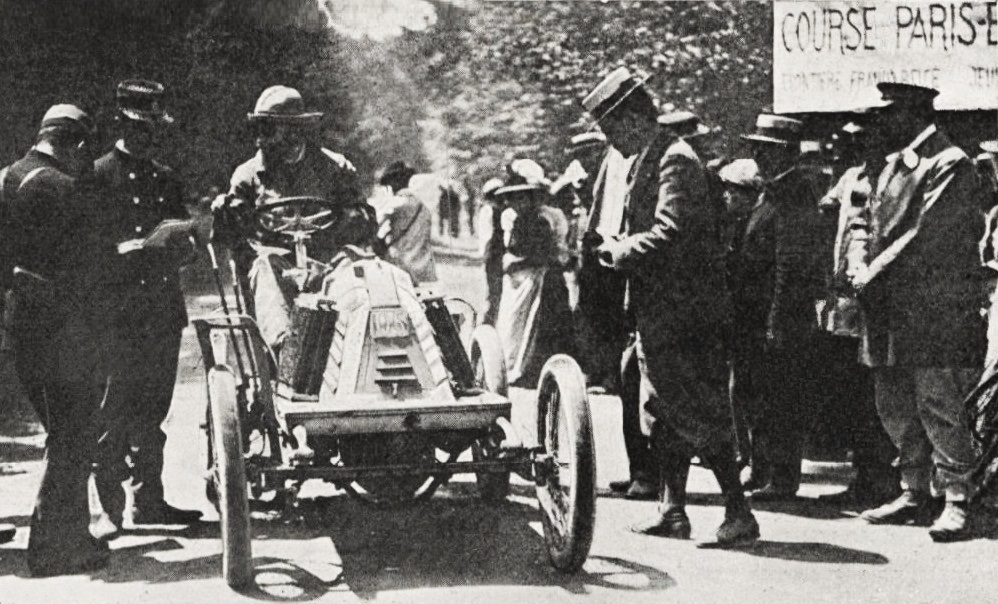
Marcel Renault during the Paris-Berlin 1901 (Belgian border).

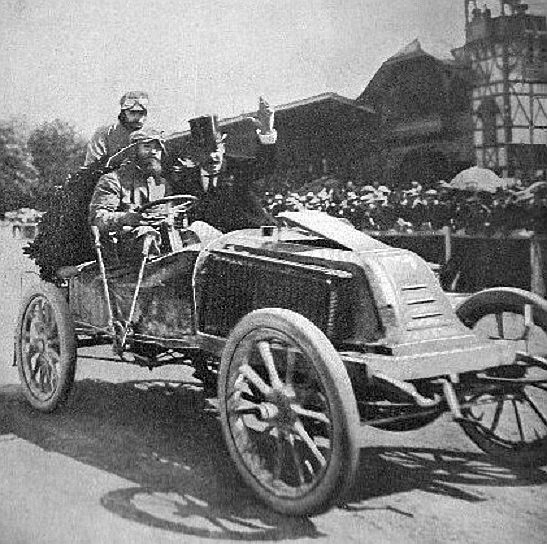
Marcel Renault winner of Paris-Vienne 1902 in a Renault Type K.

=== Accident and death ===
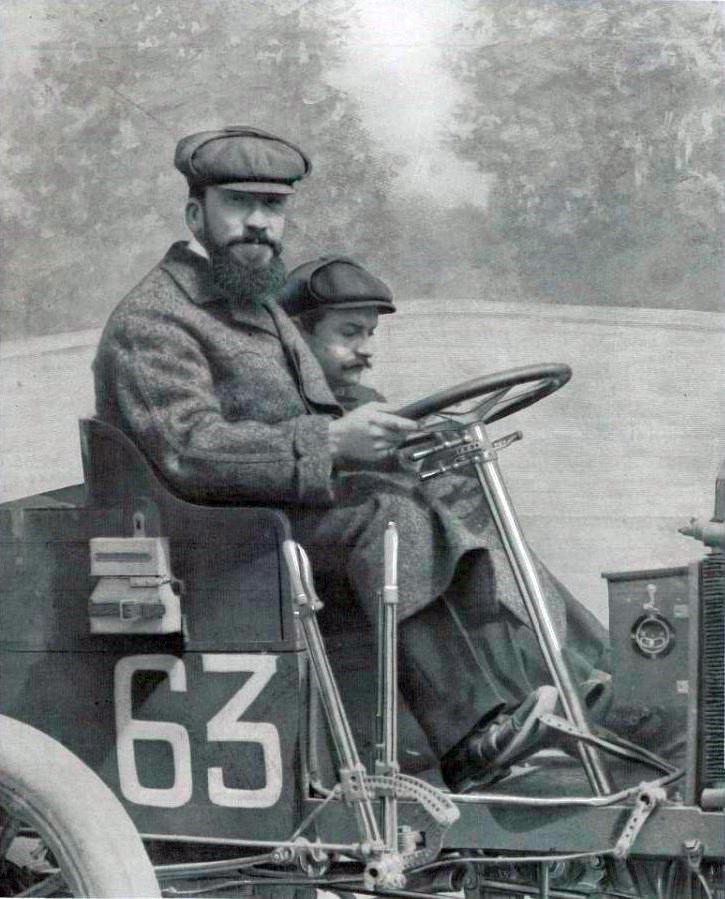
Paris-Madrid Race 1903. Marcel Renault with his mechanic René Vauthier.

He died in Payré, near Poitiers, at the age of 31 of severe injuries he sustained during the Paris-Madrid race. While overtaking another driver, he was blinded by a cloud of dust that prevented him from seeing an upcoming bend. Their car, a 40 horsepower Renault, left the road at over 100 km/h, entered a ditch and spun, violently ejecting Renault and his mechanic René Vauthier. Gravely injured, Vauthier survived with several fractures, but Renault received a spinal injury and put into a coma. Renault died 48 hours later at a farm spectators transported him to. The race was cancelled after other racers either finished in Bordeaux or crashed, with Louis Renault ending in second place. For a time after, races were banned in France. Following Marcel's death, Louis quit racing, and his riding mechanic Ferenc Szisz took over racing for the brand.

Paris-Madrid Race 1903

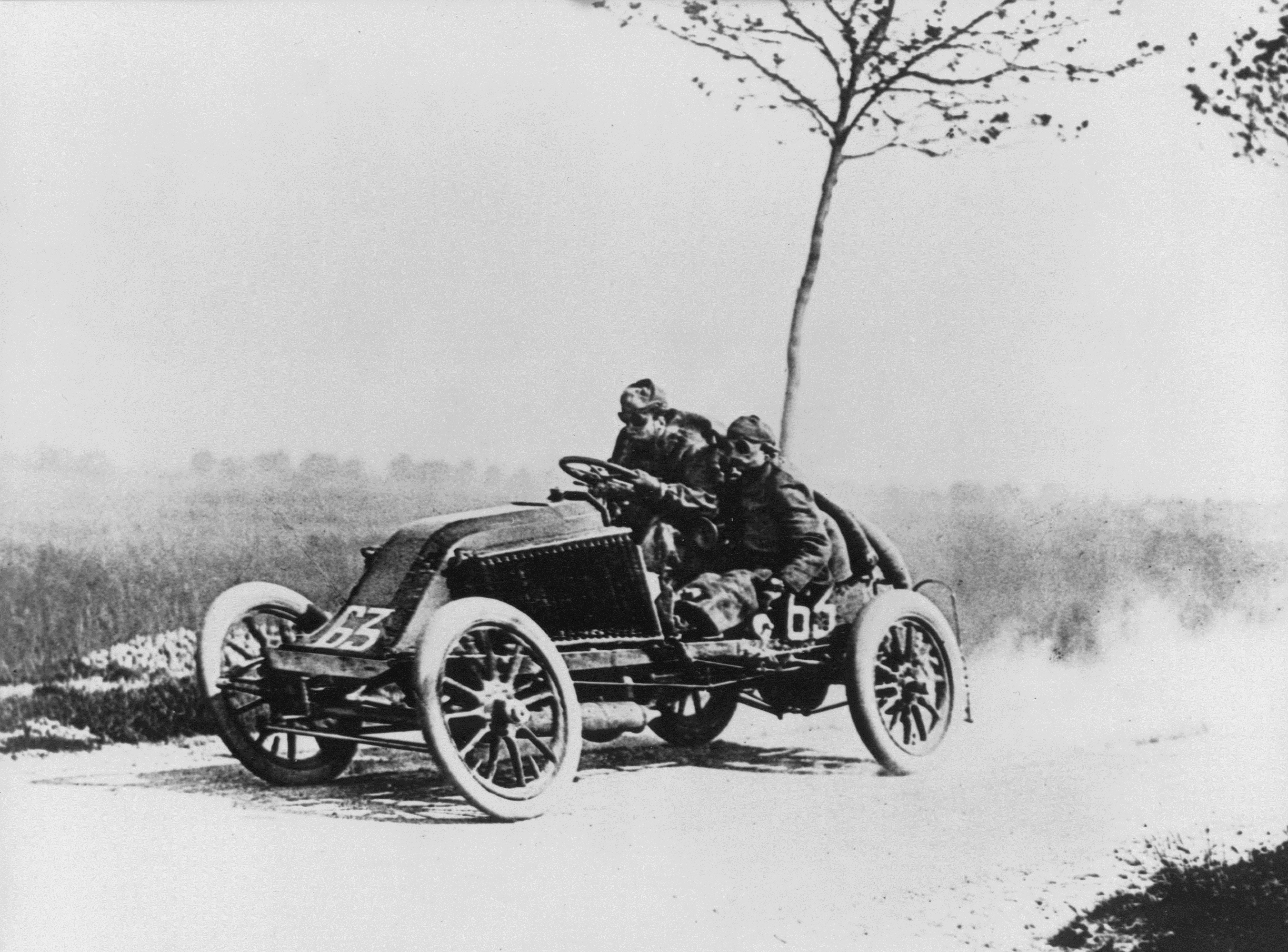
Marcel Renault's car at full speed a few kilometers before the accident.

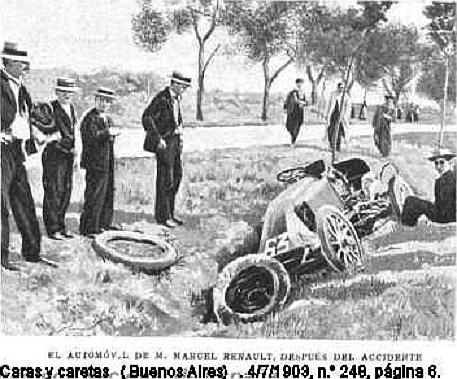
24 May 1903 in Couhé-Vérac, near Poitiers, Marcel Renault's car during the fatal accident.

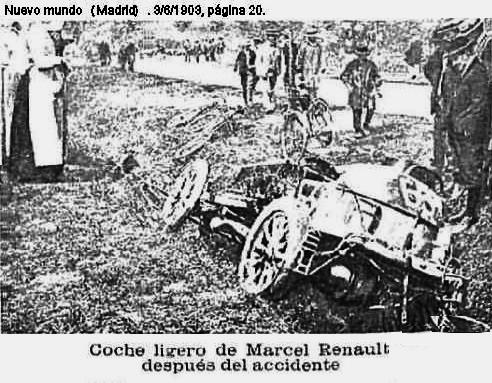
24 May 1903 in Couhé-Vérac, near Poitiers, Marcel Renault's car after the accident.

After his death, a statue was built in Renault's memory which later would be destroyed by the German attacks during World War II.
