= Révolution nationale =

Ideological program of Vichy France

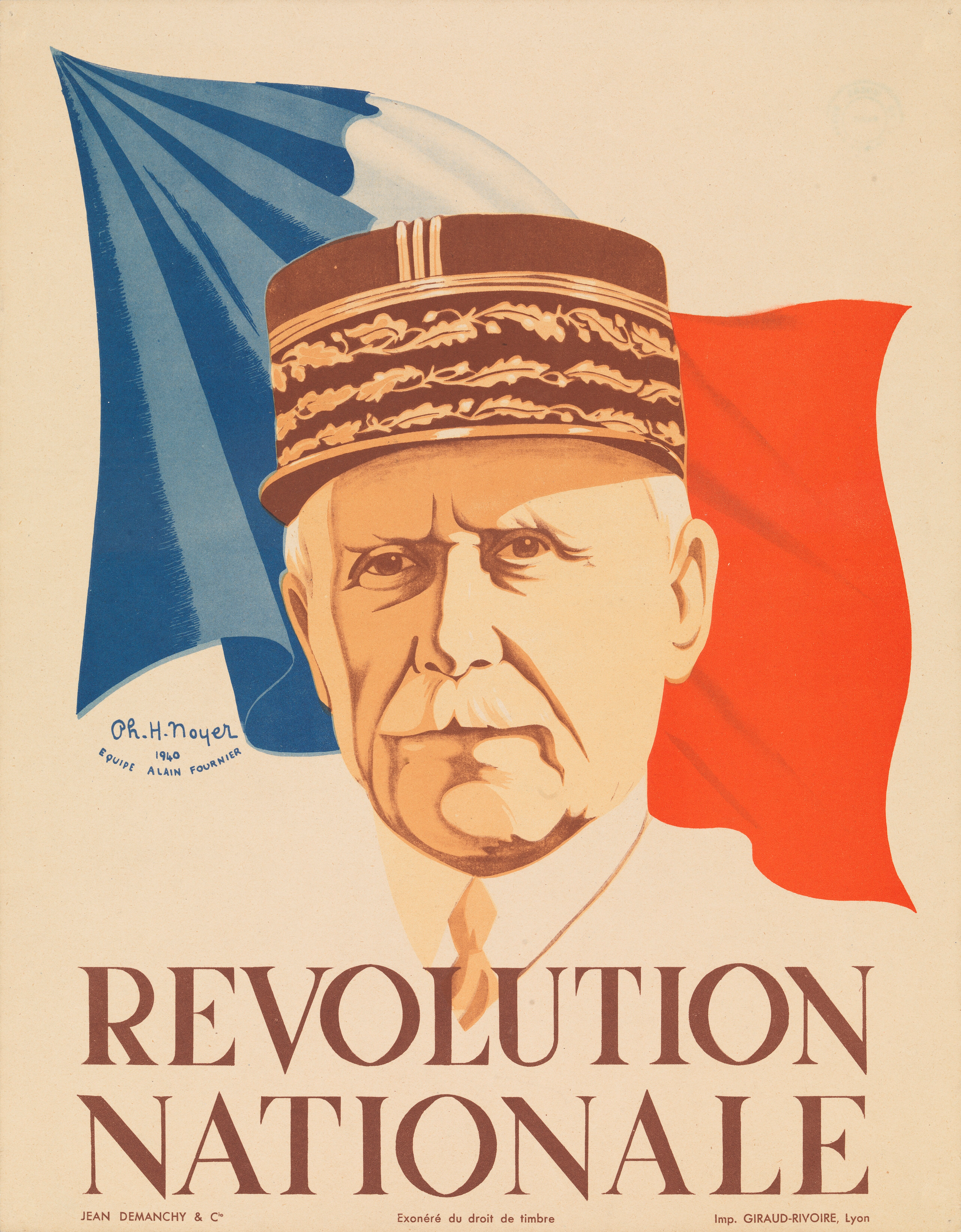
1940 Révolution nationale propaganda poster depicting Philippe Pétain

The Révolution nationale (French pronunciation: [ʁevɔlysjɔ̃ nɑsjɔnal]; lit. 'National Revolution') was the official ideological program promoted by Vichy France (French State) which had been established in July 1940 and led by Marshal Philippe Pétain, after whom the ideological underpinning of Vichy France has also been referred to as Pétainism, also referred to as Vichyism (Vichyisme). Pétain's regime was characterized by anti-parliamentarism, personality cultism, xenophobia, state-sponsored antisemitism, promotion of traditional values, rejection of the constitutional separation of powers, and state corporatism, as well as opposition to the theory of class conflict. Despite its name, the ideological policies were reactionary rather than revolutionary as the program opposed almost every change introduced to French society by the French Revolution. Vichy France is often described as traditional right-wing and authoritarian conservative as opposed to fascism; at the same time, the regime featured characteristics of fascism, and the definition of Vichy as fascist has been advocated by some historians.

As soon as it was established, Pétain's government took measures against the "undesirables", namely Jews, métèques (foreigners), Freemasons, and Communists. The persecution of these four groups was inspired by Charles Maurras' concept of the "Anti-France", or "internal foreigners", which he defined as the "four confederate states of Protestants, Jews, Freemasons and foreigners". The regime also persecuted Romani people, homosexuals, and left-wing activists in general. Vichy imitated the racial policies of the Third Reich and also engaged in natalist policies aimed at reviving the "French race" (including a sports policy), although these policies never went as far as Nazi eugenics.

Although Pétainism ended with the dissolution of Vichy France, such terms as Neo-Pétainism have been used to describe modern French far-right movements.

== Ideology ==
=== Overview ===
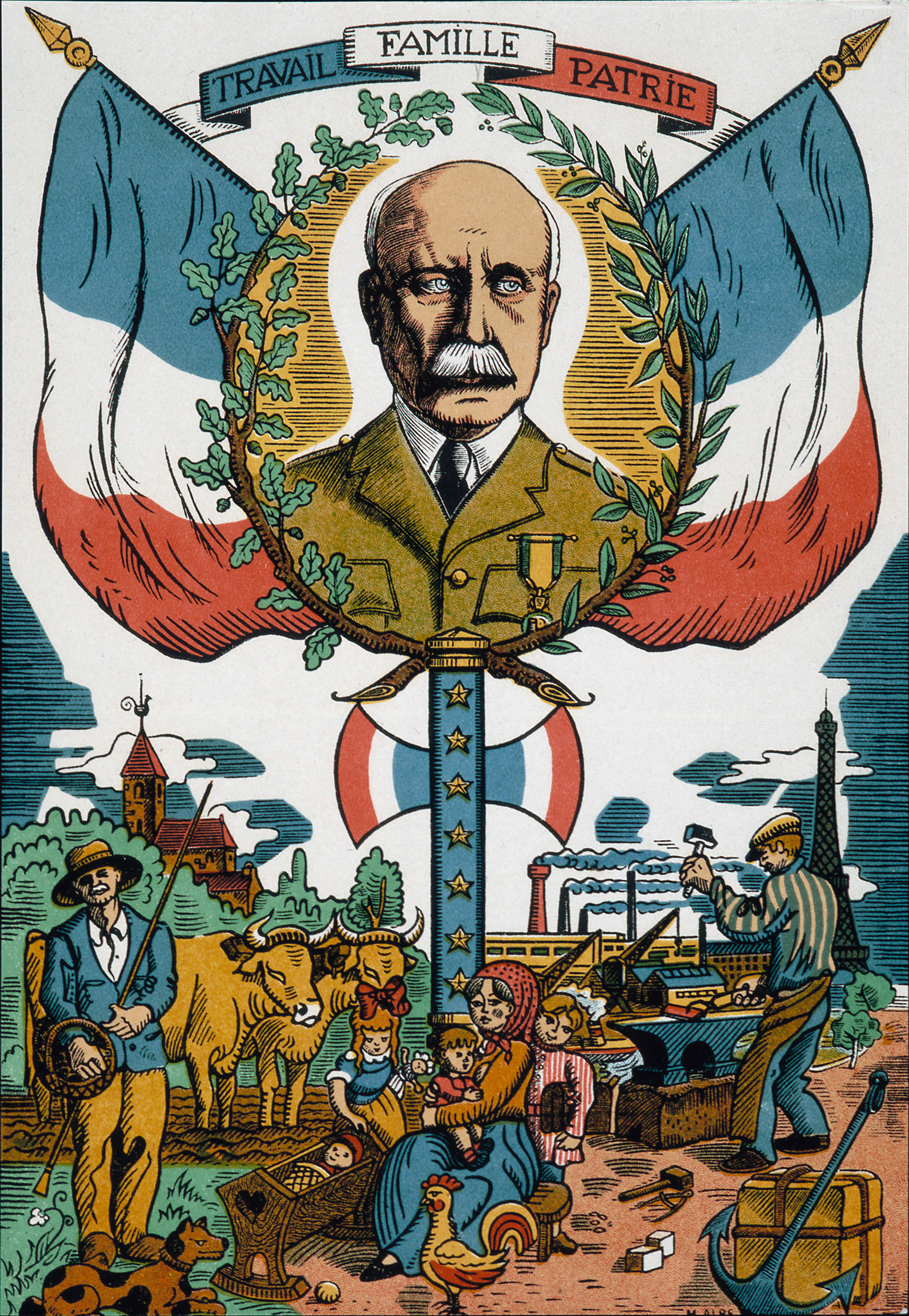
1942 propaganda poster promoting the personality cult of Philippe Pétain

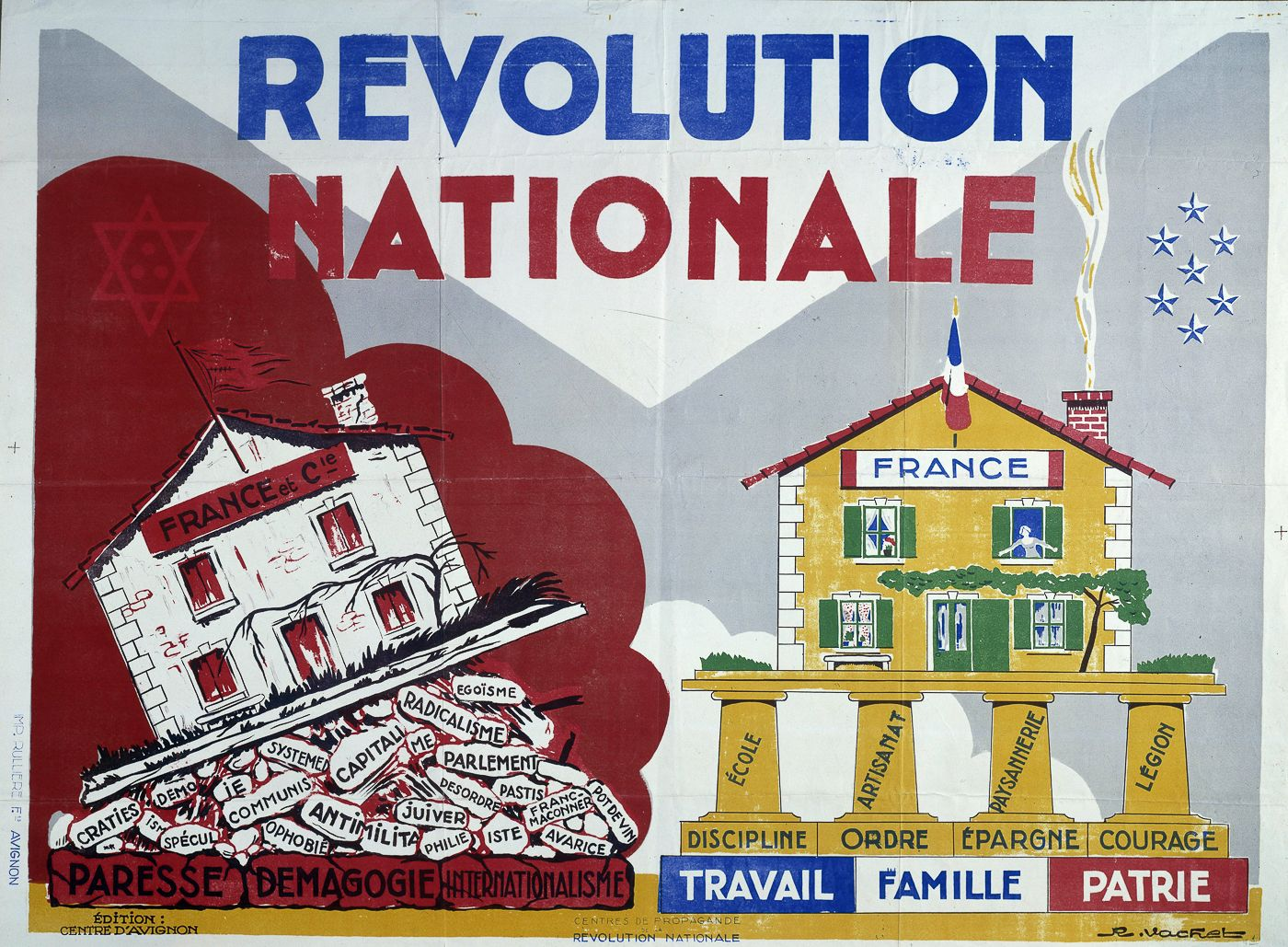
Vichy poster comparing the security of a house built on the principles of the National Revolution with the insecurity of one based on "laziness", "demagogy" and "internationalism"

The ideology of the French State (Vichy France) was an adaptation of the ideas of the French far-right, including monarchism and Maurrassisme, by a crisis government that was a client state, born out of the defeat of France against Nazi Germany. It included:

- The conflation of legislative and executive powers: the Constitutional Acts drafted by Marshal Pétain on 11 July 1940 gave to him "more powers than to Louis XIV" (according to a quote by Pétain himself, brought by his civil head of staff, H. Du Moulin de Labarthète), including that of drafting a new Constitution.
- Anti-parliamentarism and rejection of the multi-party system.
- Personality cultism: Marshal Pétain's portrait was omnipresent, printed on money, stamps, walls or represented in sculptures. A song to his glory, Maréchal, nous voilà !, became the unofficial national anthem. Obedience to the leader and to the hierarchy was exalted.
- Corporatism, with the establishment of a Labour Charter (suppression of trade-unions replaced by corporations organized by profession, suppression of the right to strike).
- Stigmatization of the Republic, presented as a period of national decadence, and in particular, of those its politicians and officers allegedly as responsible for the military defeat, expressed in particular during the Riom Trial (1942–43).
- State-sponsored antisemitism and racism, connected with Anglophobia. The New Order was presented as a purification of France and Europe from the influence of the alleged degenerate races and "Anglo-Saxon" influences.
- "Organicism" and rejection of class conflict.
- Promotion of traditional values. The Republican motto of "Liberté, égalité, fraternité" was replaced by the motto of "Labour, Family, Fatherland" (Travail, famille, patrie).
- Clericalism and promotion of traditional Catholic values.
- Rejection of cultural modernism and of intellectual and urban elites. Policy of "return to the earth".

None of these changes was forced on France by Germany. The Vichy government instituted them voluntarily as part of the National Revolution, while Germany interfered little in internal French affairs for the first two years after the armistice as long as public order was maintained. It was suspicious of the aspects of the National Revolution that encouraged French patriotism, and banned Vichy veteran and youth groups from the Occupied Zone.

=== Vichyism and fascism ===
Vichy was intensely anti-communist; it also exhibited certain characteristics of fascism. Among historians, there have been different views on whether to call Vichy France fascist or traditional right.

There is evidence for both views, and it has been noted that the features described as conservative were shared by Nazi Germany and Fascist Italy as well. The proponents of the approach of defining Vichy as authoritarian conservative as opposed to fascist also emphasized the absence of fascist mass mobilization and relative freedom of traditional and economic authorities; the opposing argument is that although the regime did not display the same desire for a mobilized national community as Germany and Italy did, it still had aspirations of mobilization, while in Germany and to a greater extent in Italy, the traditional and economic elites similarly preserved their "latitude".

American historian Stanley G. Payne found that it was "distinctly rightist and authoritarian but never fascist". Similarly, French historian Olivier Wieviorka rejects the idea that Vichy France was fascist on the grounds that "Pétain refused to create a single party state, avoided getting France involved in a new war, hated modernization, and supported the Church."

The political scientist Robert Paxton wrote that genuinely fascist elements had only minor roles in the range of supporters from reactionaries to moderate liberal modernizers; at the same time, Paxton argued that since fascism and conservatism had much in common, Vichy qualified as fascist.

French historian Alain-Gérard Slama argues that Vichy established a specific kind of totalitarian dictatorship which at the same time was not fascist, since it sought "total subordination of civil society to state supervision", but did not "claim to resolve social conflicts, achieve its ends and mobilize the energies of its recruits by using a "scapegoat" and adhered to cultural continuity in contrast to the Fascist "rupture and complete rejection of the past."

According to Roger Austin, "whilst [Vichy's] ideological atmosphere may have betrayed its conservative origins," in its attempts at mass mobilization, surveillance policies and exectutive repression advanced to fascism more than it may be supposed. Roger Griffin noted the similarities of Vichy with fascist regmies and described it as para-fascist, on the one hand, stemming from not a populist Fascist movement, but a wide spectrum of right-wing opponents of liberalism and socialism among the upper echelons of society, but on the other hand, relying on various fascist-like institutions of social control and engineering (such as the youth organization Compagnons de France), a grassroots organization of mobilization of men (Légion Française des Combattants), paramilitary elite (the Milice) and the secret Service du Contrôle Technique (SCT), designed both to reveal the public opinion of the Pétainist regime and persecute any dissent to it, from public pro-German critics to the listeners of BBC; Martin Blinkhorn calls the activities of the SCT the strongest argument in defining Vichy France as a totalitarian regime.

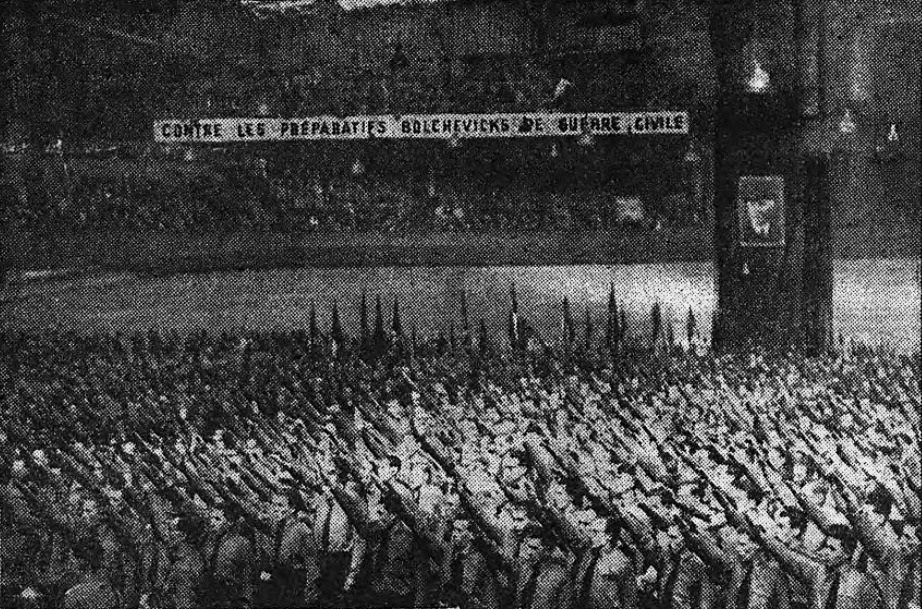
Members of the Milice performing the Roman salute, 1943

The historian Zeev Sternhell described Vichy France as "totalitarian" and "no less fascist than Mussolini's Italy," with a racial legislation harsher than the one of Italy and even the Nuremberg Laws, and the ideology of the regime, determined not only to dismantle the intstitutions of democracy, "but to kill its spirit," as grounded in the traditions of the "war" of the French "revolutionary right" against "liberalism, democracy and socialism", and in terms of philosophy, against the Enlightenment. Some proponents of the definition of Vichy as fascist put an emphasis on the last two years of the regime marked by the organization of the Milice, fascist by its ideology. The historian H. R. Kedward wrote: "Much of Vichy's ideology, it is often argued, was of a traditional, right-wing, nationalist nature, harking back to a pre-Revolutionary, rural age, with the accent on hierarchy and provincial values, and this competed with the technocratic modernism of some of its ministries. And yet it is this very synthesis of opposites, a familiar characteristic of fascist regimes, which suggests that Vichy, at least in its last two repressive vears, was indeed a variant of fascism."

=== Symbolism and historical legimitization ===
The Vichy government's "francisque" insignia featured two symbols from the Gallic period: the baton and the double-headed hatchet (labrys) arranged so as to resemble the fasces, the symbol of the Italian Fascists.

Joan of Arc replaced Marianne as the national symbol of France under Vichy, as her status as one of France's best-loved heroines gave her widespread appeal, and the image of Joan as a devout Catholic and patriot also fit well with Vichy's traditionalist message. Vichy literature portrayed Joan as an archetypal virgin and Marianne as an archetypal whore. Under the Vichy regime, the school textbook Miracle de Jeanne by René Jeanneret was required reading, and the anniversary of Joan's death became an occasion for school speeches commemorating her martyrdom. Joan's encounter with angelic voices, according to Catholic tradition, were presented as literal history. The textbook Miracle de Jeanne declared "the Voices did speak!" in contrast with republican school texts, which had strongly implied Joan was mentally ill. Vichy instructors sometimes struggled to square Joan's military heroism with the classical virtues of womanhood, with one school textbook insisting that girls ought not follow Joan's example literally, saying: "Some of the most notable heroes in our history have been women. But nevertheless, girls should preferably exercise the virtues of patience, persistence and resignation. They are destined to tend to the running of the household ... It is in love that our future mothers will find the strength to practise those virtues which best befit their sex and their condition".

Summarizing Pétain's speeches, the British historian Christopher Flood wrote that Pétain blamed la décadence on "political and economic liberalism, with its divisive, individualistic and hedonistic values – locked in sterile rivalry with its antithetical outgrowths, Socialism and Communism". Pétain argued that rescuing the French people from décadence required a period of authoritarian government that would restore national unity and the traditionalist morality, which Pétain claimed the French had forgotten. During the Riom Trial, the Third Republic, in particular the Popular Front government, despite the fact that Léon Blum’s left-wing government prepared France for the war by launching a new military effort, Communists, Jews, etc, were blamed for the military defeat of France to Germany. The defendants of the Riom Trial included Blum, Édouard Daladier, Paul Reynaud, Georges Mandel and Maurice Gamelin: they were largely successful in rebutting the charges, and won sympathetic coverage in the international press, leading to the suspension of the trial in 1942 and its closure in 1943.

Despite his highly-negative view of the Third Republic, Pétain argued that la France profonde ("deep France", denoting profoundly French aspects of French culture) still existed, and that the French people needed to return to what Pétain insisted was their true identity. Alongside this claim for a moral revolution was Pétain's call for France to turn inwards and to withdraw from the world, which Pétain always portrayed as a hostile and threatening place full of endless dangers for the French.

The Vichy government tried to assert its legitimacy by symbolically connecting itself with the Gallo-Roman period of France's history, and celebrated the Gaulish chieftain Vercingetorix as the "founder" of the French nation. It was asserted that just as the defeat of the Gauls in the Battle of Alesia (52 BC) had been the moment in French history when a sense of common nationhood was born, the defeat of 1940 would again unify the nation.

=== Cult of personality ===
To advance his message, Pétain frequently spoke on French radio. In his radio speeches, Pétain always used the personal pronoun je (French for the English word "I"), portrayed himself as a Christ-like figure sacrificing himself for France and assuming a God-like tone of a semi-omniscient narrator who knew truths about the world that the rest of the French did not.

=== Racial purification ===
Jews, national or not, were excluded from the Nation, and prohibited from working in public services. The first law on the status of Jews was promulgated on 3 October 1940. Thousands of naturalized Jews were deprived of their citizenship, while all Jews were forced to wear a yellow badge. The next day, Pétain signed another edict, this one authorizing detainment of foreign Jews in France. The Crémieux Decree of 1870 was abrogated on 7 October by Interior Minister Marcel Peyrouton, stripping Algerian Jews of their French citizenship as well. A numerus clausus drastically limited their presence at the University, among physicians, lawyers, filmmakers, bankers or small traders. Soon the list of off-limits works was greatly increased. In less than a year, more than half of the Jewish population in France was deprived of any means of subsistence. Foreign Jews first, then all Jews were at first detained in concentration camps in France, before being deported to Drancy internment camp where they were then sent to Nazi concentration camps.

No other nation was attacked as frequently and violently as Britain was in Vichy propaganda. In Pétain's radio speeches, Britain was always portrayed as the "Other", a nation that was the complete antithesis of everything good in France, the blood-soaked "Perfidious Albion" and the relentless "eternal enemy" of France whose ruthlessness knew no bounds. Joan of Arc, who had fought against England, was made into the symbol of France partly for that reason. The chief themes of Vichy Anglophobia were British "selfishness" in using and then abandoning France after instigating wars, British "treachery" and British plans to take over French colonies. The three examples that were used to illustrate these themes were the Dunkirk evacuation in May 1940, the Royal Navy attack at Mers-el-Kébir on the French Mediterranean fleet that killed over 1,300 French sailors in July 1940 and the failed Anglo-Free French attempt to seize Dakar in September 1940. Typical of Vichy anti-British propaganda was the widely distributed pamphlet published in August 1940 and written by self-proclaimed "professional Anglophobe" Henri Béraud entitled, Faut-il réduire l'Angleterre en esclavage? ("Should England Be Reduced to Slavery?"); the question in the title was merely rhetorical. Additionally, Vichy mixed Anglophobia with racism and antisemitism to portray the British as a racially degenerate "mixed race" working for Jewish capitalists, in contrast to the "racially pure" peoples on the continent of Europe who were building a "New Order". In an interview conducted by Béraud with Admiral Darlan published in Gringoire newspaper in 1941, Darlan was quoted as saying that if the "New Order" failed in Europe, it would mean "here in France, the return to power of the Jews and Freemasons subservient to Anglo-Saxon policy".

=== Clericalism ===
Catholic social teaching of the time, particularly the encyclical Quadragesimo anno of Pope Pius XI, was influential in the Vichy regime, which was also active in defending traditional Catholic values, eulogising national religious figures such as Joan d'Arc and restoring some privileges of the clergy that had been abolished by the 1905 law on the Separation of the Churches and the State, though the law was never fully repealed and Catholicism was not reinstated as a state religion. While the Catholic Church in France welcomed these changes and expressed a certain degree of support towards the regime until 1944, the Church was also strongly critical of some Vichy policies, such as the deportation of the Jews and institutional racism. Additionally, a consistent number of Catholics took part in the French Resistance with the support of some segments of the clergy, among whom Georges Bidault, who later became the founder of the Popular Republican Movement.

== Support ==
"I have never known what the National Revolution was, it was never defined and it was an expression that personally I never used [...] Everyone put his own desire, ideal and the regime that he saw into these words, but the National Revolution was never defined in any form at any time."

— Pierre Laval, speaking during his trial in 1945.

The Révolution nationale was never fully defined by the Vichy regime although it was frequently invoked by its most enthusiastic supporters. Philippe Pétain himself was rumoured to dislike the term and only used it four times in his wartime speeches. As a result, different factions formed different views of what it meant which conformed with their own ideological views about the regime and the postwar future.

The Pétainistes gathered those who supported the personal figure of Marshal Pétain, considered at that time a war hero of the Battle of Verdun. The Collaborateurs include those who collaborated with Nazi Germany or advocated collaboration, but who are considered more moderate, or more opportunistic, than the Collaborationistes, advocates of a French fascism.

Supporters of collaboration were not necessarily supporters of the National Revolution, and vice versa. Pierre Laval was a collaborationist but was dubious about the National Revolution, while others like Maxime Weygand opposed collaboration but supported the National Revolution because they believed that reforming France would help it avenge its defeat.

Those who supported the ideology of the National Revolution rather than the person of Pétain himself could be divided, in general, into three groups: the counter-revolutionary reactionaries; the supporters of a French fascism; and the reformers who saw in the new regime an opportunity to modernize the state apparatus. The last current would include opportunists such as the journalist Jean Luchaire who saw in the new regime career opportunities.

- The “Reactionaries”, in the strict sense of the word: all those who dreamt of a return to "before", either:
1. before 1936 and the Popular Front
2. before 1870 and the Third Republic or
3. before 1789 and the French Revolution.

These were part of the counter-revolutionary branch of the French far right, the oldest one being composed of Legitimists, monarchist members of the Action française (AF), etc. But the Vichy regime also received support from large sectors of the liberal Orleanists, in particular from its mouthpiece, Le Temps newspaper.

- The supporters of "French fascism", who attacked Vichy and Maurras for not seeking to bring Nazism to France. They opposed specific traditionalist aspects such as clericalism or "naive scouting", but still thought the Révolution nationale prepared for a "re-birth" of French society. These formed the most stringent Collaborationists (collaborationistes, distinct from collaborateurs who are seen as more moderate or more opportunist). Those included the supporters of Marcel Déat's Rassemblement national populaire (RNP), Jacques Doriot's Parti Populaire Français (PPF), Joseph Darnand's Service d'ordre légionnaire (SOL) militia, Marcel Bucard's Mouvement Franciste (originally funded by Benito Mussolini), members of the Cagoule terrorist group, funded by Eugène Schueller (the founder of L'Oréal cosmetic group), the writers Robert Brasillach, Louis-Ferdinand Céline or Pierre Drieu La Rochelle, Philippe Henriot at Radio Paris, etc.
- The Reformers, who were looking for new political, social and economic policies, and formed an important group during the inter-war period. Those included the non-conformists of the 1930s, Christian-democrat personalists, neo-socialists, planistes, Young Turks of the Radical Socialist Party, technocrats (Groupe X-Crise), etc. All of these circles would also provide recruits to the Resistance. Most of them were not ideologically anti-democrats, but claimed to take advantage of the new conditions set by the Vichy regime—they also included plain opportunists willing to make a quick career. They presented various and contradictory solutions: communalism, cooperatives or corporations, "return to the earth", planned economy, technocracy rule, etc. Some examples include René Belin, Minister of Production and Labour, Lucien Romier, who also became Minister of Pétain, the civil servant Gérard Bardet, X-Crise member Pierre Pucheu, François Lehideux, Yves Bouthillier, Jacques Barnaud, or the École des cadres d'Uriage, which would form the basis after the war of the elite school École nationale d'administration (ENA).

The supporters were, however, in the minority. Although the Vichy government initially had substantial support from those who were glad that the war was over and expected that Britain would soon surrender, and Pétain remained personally popular during the war, by late autumn 1940 most French hoped for a British victory and opposed collaboration with Germany.

== Eugenics ==
In 1941, Nobel Prize winner Alexis Carrel, who had been an early proponent of eugenics and euthanasia and was a member of Jacques Doriot's French Popular Party (PPF), went on to advocate the creation of the French Foundation for the Study of Human Problems (Fondation Française pour l’Etude des Problèmes Humains), using connections to the Pétain cabinet (specifically, French industrial physicians André Gros and Jacques Ménétrier). Charged with the "study, under all of its aspects, of measures aimed at safeguarding, improving and developing the French population in all of its activities," the Foundation was created by decree of the Vichy regime in 1941, and Carrel appointed as "regent".

== Sport policy ==
Vichy's policy concerning sports found its origins in the conception of Georges Hébert (1875–1957), who denounced professional and spectacular competition, and like Pierre de Coubertin, founder of the modern Olympic Games, who was a supporter of amateurism. Vichy's sport policy followed the moral aim of "rebuilding the nation", was opposed to Léo Lagrange's sport policy during the Popular Front, and was specifically opposed to professional sport imported from the United Kingdom. They also were used to engrain the youth in various associations and federations, as done by the Hitler Youth or Mussolini's Balilla.

On 7 August 1940, a Commissariat Général à l’Education Générale et Sportive (General Commissioner to General and Sport Education) was created. Three men in particular headed this policy:

- Jean Ybarnegaray, president and founder of the French and International Federations of Basque pelota, deputy and member of François de la Rocque’s Parti Social Français (PSF). Ybarnegaray was first nominated State minister in May 1940, then State secretary from June to September 1940.
- Jean Borotra, former international tennis player (member of “The Four Musketeers”) and also a PSF member, the first General Commissioner to Sports from August 1940 to April 1942.
- Colonel Joseph Pascot, former rugby champion, director of sports under Borotra and then second General Commissioner to Sports from April 1942 to July 1944.

In October 1940, the two General Commissioners prohibited professionalism in two federations (tennis and wrestling), while permitting a three-year delay for four other federations (football, cycling, boxing and Basque pelota). They prohibited competitions for women in cycling or association football. Furthermore, they prohibited, or spoiled by seizing the assets of, at least four uni-sport federations (rugby league, table tennis, Jeu de paume and badminton) and one multi-sport federation (the FSGT). In April 1942, they additionally prohibited the activities of the UFOLEP and USEP multi-sport federations, also seizing their goods which were to be transferred to the “National Council of Sports”.

== Quotes ==
- “Sport well directed is morality in action” (“Le sport bien dirigé, c’est de la morale en action”), Report of E. Loisel to Jean Borotra, 15 October 1940
- “I pledge on my honour to practice sports with selflessness, discipline and loyalty to improve myself and serve better my fatherland” (Sportsman's pledge — « Je promets sur l’honneur de pratiquer le sport avec désintéressement, discipline et loyauté pour devenir meilleur et mieux servir ma patrie »)
- “to be strong to serve better” (IO 1941)
- “Our principle is to seize the individual everywhere. At primary school, we have him. Later on he tends to escape us. We strive to catch up with him at every turn. I have arranged for this discipline of EG (General Education) to be imposed on students (...) We allow for sanctions in case of desertion.” (« Notre principe est de saisir l’individu partout. Au primaire, nous le tenons. Plus haut il tend à s’échapper. Nous nous efforçons de le rattraper à tous les tournants. J’ai obtenu que cette discipline de l’EG soit imposée aux étudiants (…). Nous prévoyons des sanctions en cas de désertion »), Colonel Joseph Pascot, speech on 27 June 1942

== Neo-Petainism ==
Petainism and Neo-Petainism have been used as labels to define some right-wing far-right political movements in France which emerged after World War II.

The founder of the far-right Front National (FN) Jean-Marie Le Pen and its prominent member Bruno Gollnisch have been described as politicians "true to their roots on the ultra-nationalist, Neo-Petainist right," loyal to the nostalgia for the Vichy regime "in and around the FN". The activities of the FN included promoting historical revisionism of Vichy France, the Holocaust and the conclusions of the Nuremberg Trials.

== See also ==
- Far-right politics in France
- History of France (1900–present)
- The Holocaust in France
- Popular Front (France)
- Project 2025
- Vichy France
