= Vaux, Vienne =

Vaux
- Part of Valence-en-Poitou
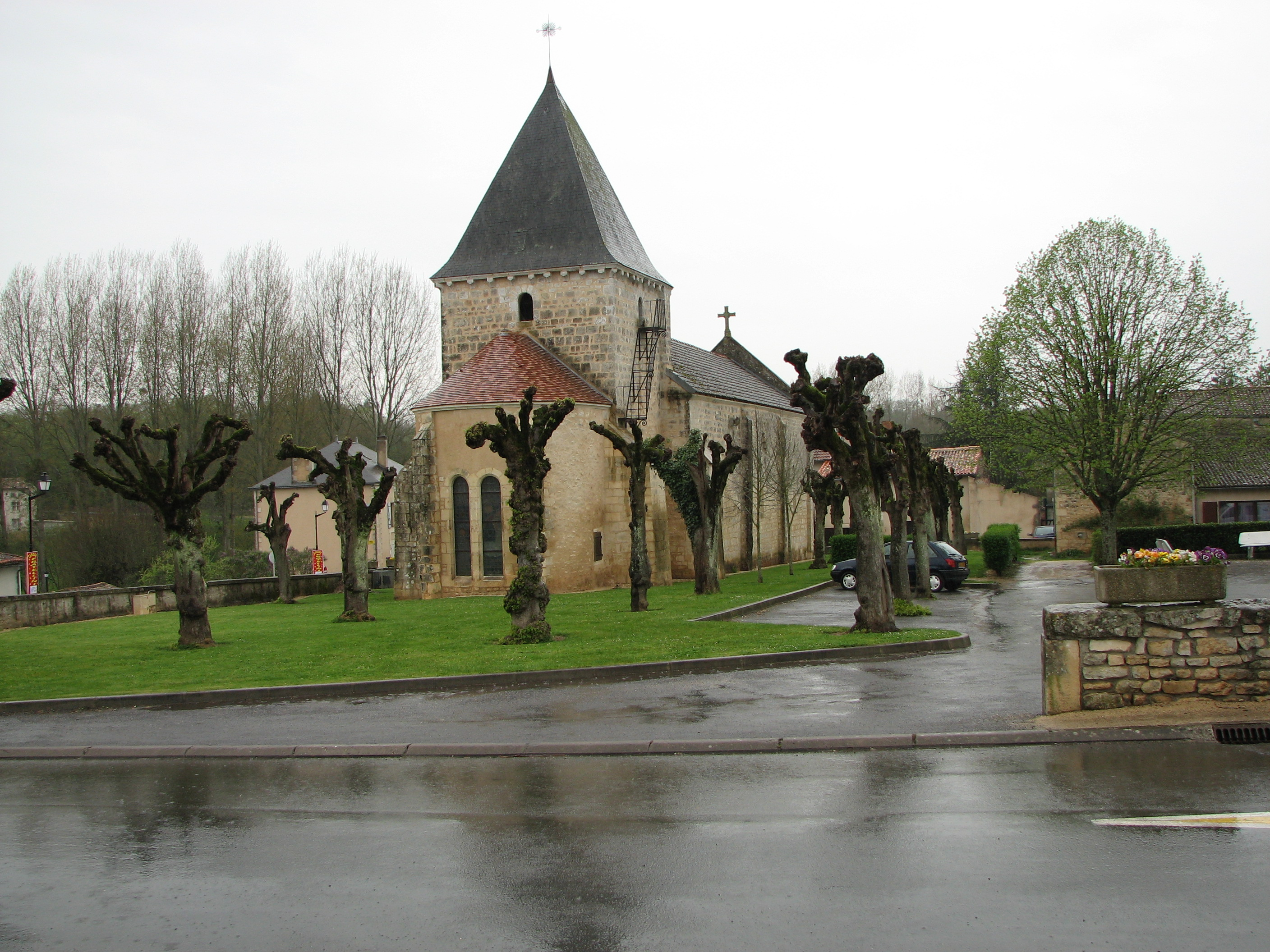
- The church in Vaux
- Location of Vaux
- Location within France Location within Nouvelle-Aquitaine
- Coordinates: 46°17′54″N 0°13′19″E
- Country: France
- Region: Nouvelle-Aquitaine
- Department: Vienne
- Arrondissement: Montmorillon
- Canton: Lusignan
- Commune: Valence-en-Poitou
- Area^{1}: 25.84 km^{2} (9.98 sq mi)
- Elevation: 120 m (390 ft)
- Highest elevation: 151 m (495 ft)
- Lowest elevation: 106 m (348 ft)
- Population (2022): 786
  - Density: 30.4/km^{2} (78.8/sq mi)
- Time zone: UTC+01:00 (CET)
  - Summer (DST): UTC+02:00 (CEST)
- Postal code: 86700
- ^{1} French Land Register data, which excludes lakes, ponds, glaciers > 1 km^{2} (0.386 sq mi or 247 acres) and river estuaries.

Vaux (French pronunciation: [vo]) or Vaux-en-Couhé ([vo ɑ̃ ku.e]) is a former commune in the Vienne department in the Nouvelle-Aquitaine region in western France. On 1 January 2019, it was merged into the new commune Valence-en-Poitou.

Its inhabitants are called the Valois and Valoises. It covered 25.8 km^{2} and had 786 inhabitants in 2022. Surrounded by the communes of Chatillon, Romagna and Ceaux-en-Couhé, Vaux is located 33 km southwest of Poitiers, the largest city nearby.
