= Pierre Pucheu =

French industrialist & Vichy government minister (1899-1944)

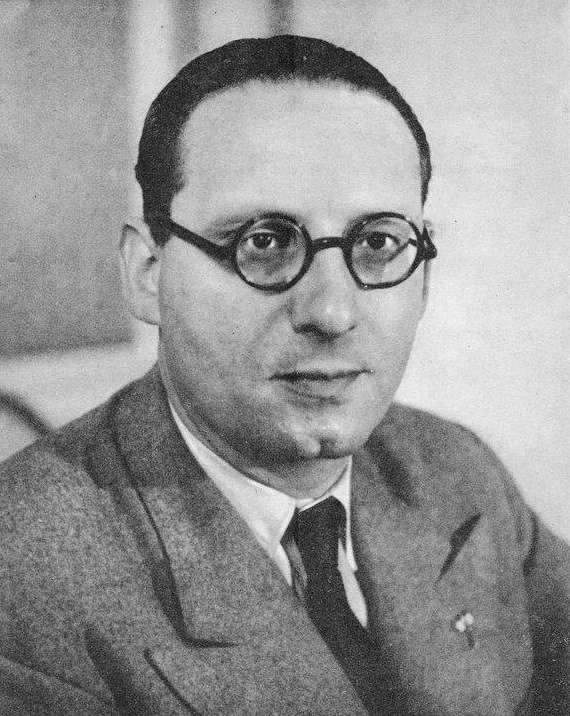
- Pierre Pucheu in 1941

Minister of the Interior
- In office 18 July 1941 – 18 April 1942
- President: Philippe Pétain
- Preceded by: François Darlan
- Succeeded by: Pierre Laval

Personal details
- Born: Pierre Firmin Pucheu; 27 June 1899 Beaumont-sur-Oise, France
- Died: 20 March 1944 (aged 44) Algiers, French Algeria
- Cause of death: Execution by firing squad
- Party: Croix-de-Feu; Parti Populaire Français
- Education: École Normale Supérieure
- Profession: Industrialist

Pierre Firmin Pucheu (27 June 1899 – 20 March 1944) was a French industrialist, fascist and member of the Vichy government. After his marriage, he became the son-in-law of the Belgian architect Paul Saintenoy. He was tried and executed for treason in March 1944.

== Early years ==
The son of a tailor from southwest France, Pucheu was born in Beaumont-sur-Oise and won a scholarship to the École Normale Supérieure in Paris, where he was a contemporary of both Robert Brasillach and Jean-Paul Sartre. Initially intending to follow the path of a writer himself, he became enamoured of capitalism in Paris and determined instead to enter the business world. He was ultimately drawn to the steel industry and eventually came to head up one of the largest monopolies, the Cartel d'Acier.

Initially showing little real interest in politics, his interest was sparked by the 6 February 1934 crisis and he became associated first with the Croix-de-Feu and then with Jacques Doriot's Parti Populaire Français before splitting from the latter group in 1938 over Doriot's financial links with Nazi Germany and Fascist Italy. In particular Pucheu was opposed to the Munich Agreement, which he felt punished Czechoslovakia. This was in part motivated by Pucheu's business interests, which included close links to Škoda Works, a company threatened by German expansion. Pucheu's support for the PPF had been motivated by what he saw as the growth of communism and the desire for a rightist party to oppose that whilst his departure from the group (along with that of other industrialists whom he had encouraged to support them) saw the PPF decline sharply due a significant drop in funding.

== Vichy ==
After the occupation his political profile rose as he was pushed by industrialist allies in charge of Le Temps who ensured that he was given the position of Minister of Industrial Production in 1941, before being promoted to Minister of the Interior later that same year. In the latter role he became noted for his heavy-handed approach, notably selecting personally 89 hostages for execution in October 1941 in reprisal for the killing of German officers. He also formed the Police aux Questions Juives in 1941 and took personal charge of the organisation. He was also responsible for setting up the SPAC anti-communist police force, the anti-Masonic Service for Secret Societies, and the Amicales de France, which served as the propaganda arm of Vichy.

According to Joseph Barthélemy, Pucheu, who had a violent hatred of communists and Jews, was a confirmed Nazi. However, Pucheu actually wanted to model France's economy on Nazi Germany's rather than being fully convinced of the merits of occupation, and as such the Germans called for him to be replaced in April 1942. As part of a loose intellectual movement known as the jeunes cyclists, Pucheu quickly came to terms with Germany as the leader of Europe but hoped that economic renewal would ensure France would be one of the leading secondary powers in this new order. In government Pucheu has been characterised, along with the likes of Jean Bichelonne, Jacques Barnaud and François Lehideux, as a technocrat who helped to ensure that the Vichy regime was able to take on the administrative functions of a government. They were said to belong to a group called the Synarchy. Like Bichelonne he was devotee of Saint-Simonianism, the belief in industrialisation as the motor of progress in society, a belief that was not shared by the rural traditionalist Philippe Pétain.

== After Vichy ==
Deprived of his position, Pucheu moved, just after the allied landings in North Africa, to Spain, and at the invitation of General Giraud, who promised him safe passage. The French army and administration in North Africa under Giraud had reentered the war against the Axis without renouncing Pétain or the Vichy National Revolution; expecting to be called up to duty as a reserve military officer, Pucheu went to Casablanca, Morocco in May 1943.

== Trial and execution ==
By then, however, General Charles de Gaulle was the dominant influence in North Africa, not Giraud. Despite the safe passage offer, Pucheu was arrested and charged with treason and making illegal arrests, and was transferred to Algiers in October 1943. He was tried in March 1944, convicted, and sentenced to death. Despite a request for clemency by General Giraud, de Gaulle refused to intervene, although personally regretting the political necessity of Pucheu's execution, and expressing admiration for the way in which he had conducted himself during the trial. Pucheu was the first person tried under the French Committee of National Liberation's September 1943 edict charging all Vichy ministers with treason; it is said that de Gaulle had ensured that he faced the death penalty in order to undermine any further collaboration in France. On 20 March 1944, Pucheu was executed by firing squad. He met his death with great courage, shaking hands with the firing squad, and giving the order to fire himself. He was the first of the leading collaborationist figures to be executed directly under de Gaulle's jurisdiction.

Political offices
Preceded by François Darlan	Minister of the Interior; 1941–1942	Succeeded by Pierre Laval
