= Henry du Moulin de Labarthète =

French civil servant

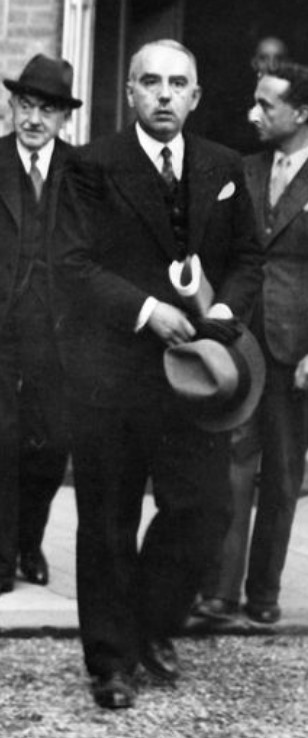
- Born: March 19, 1900; Paris, France
- Died: October 10, 1948 (aged 48); Aire-sur-l'Adour, Landes, Aquitaine, France
- Education: Collège Stanislas de Paris
- Spouse: Béatrice Brinquant (died 1992)
- Relatives: Edgar Pothier (maternal grandfather)

Henry du Moulin de Labarthète (1900–1948) was a French senior civil servant, tax auditor, diplomat and memoirist. He served as Cabinet Secretary under Marshal Philippe Pétain from 1940 to 1942. He was a staunch supporter of the Révolution nationale. He was described as "an influential man in the Vichy government." He was opposed to German policies and, after resigning from government positions in December 1943, he went into exile in Switzerland until 1947. He retired and died in France.

== Early life ==
Henry du Moulin de Labarthète was born on March 19, 1900, in Paris. His father was Edmond du Moulin de Labarthète and his mother, Marguerite Pothier. He had five siblings.

His paternal family had belonged to the French nobility since the 16th century. His paternal grandfather, Henri du Moulin de Labarthète, was a magistrate. His maternal grandfather, Edgar Pothier, was a French general. As some of his ancestors served in the Continental Army during the American Revolutionary War, he was a member of the Society of the Cincinnati.

He was educated at the Collège Stanislas de Paris, where he passed his Baccalaureate in 1918. He graduated from the University of Paris in 1921, where he received a law degree. He was a member of the Conférence Olivaint, a Roman Catholic student organization. He did his military service in Syria in 1922.

== Career ==
He was a senior civil servant, and became a tax auditor in 1925. From 1928 to 1930, he served as Chief of Staff to Henry Chéron, the Minister of Finances. He remained of Staff when Paul Reynaud became the Minister in 1930. A year later, in January 1931, as Reynaud became the Minister of the Colonies, he was his co-Chief of Staff. He then served at the Banque de l'Afrique Occidentale in 1932. In 1934, he became treasurer of the right-wing Front National alliance.

He was appointed again as Paul Reynaud's Chief of Staff when the latter became Minister of Justice in 1938. In 1939, he was appointed as a financial attaché at the French embassy in Madrid, when Philippe Pétain was the French Ambassador to Spain. In 1939, as France joined World War II, he served briefly in Franche-Comté and Alsace. By October 1939, while Raoul Dautry was Minister of Armament, he was sent back to Spain and Portugal to negotiate the purchase of pyrite and mercury for French ordnance, but he was unsuccessful.

From 1940 to 1942, he served as the Cabinet Secretary to Pétain, then Marshal of France. A Maurrassian, he became a staunch supporter of the Révolution nationale spearheaded by Pétain.

He was appointed by Finance Minister Pierre Cathala as a financial attaché at the French embassy in Bern, Switzerland, from 1942 to 1943. However, he resigned in December 1943 due to disagreements with the German policies implemented under Prime Minister Pierre Laval. As a result, he went into exile in Switzerland until 1947.

During his years of exile, he wrote his memoirs, based on his memories of events from July 1940 to August 1942, entitled Le Temps des illusions - Souvenirs. It was released by a Swiss publisher in 1946. He also wrote a history of his paternal family, published in 1946 by the same publisher. Meanwhile, in the aftermath of World War II, he was barred from the civil service in 1945. However, he filed a lawsuit and was cleared in 1948.

He was a recipient of the Order of the Francisque.

== Personal life ==
He married Béatrice Brinquant (1905–1992) on January 29, 1930.

== Death ==
He died of a heart attack on October 10, 1948, in Aire-sur-l'Adour, rural Southwestern France.

== Bibliography ==
- Le Temps des illusions – Souvenirs (juillet 1940–avril 1942) (Geneva, Switzerland: Les Éditions du cheval ailé, 1946).
- La vie en Armagnac et en Tursan à travers celle d’une de leurs familles (1450–1942) (Geneva, Switzerland: Les Éditions du cheval ailé, 1946).
