= Valence-en-Poitou =

- Commune
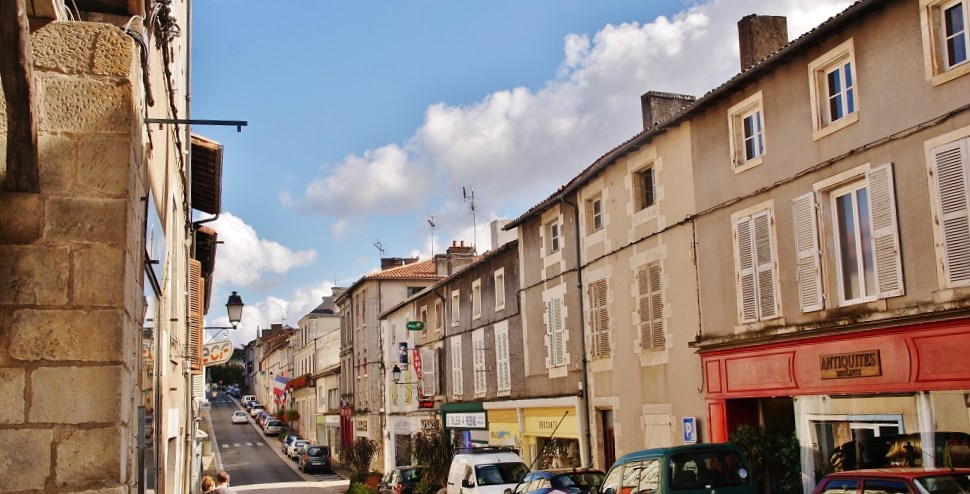
- Couhé
- Location of Valence-en-Poitou
- Location within France Location within Nouvelle-Aquitaine
- Coordinates: 46°17′59″N 0°10′55″E
- Country: France
- Region: Nouvelle-Aquitaine
- Department: Vienne
- Arrondissement: Montmorillon
- Canton: Lusignan
- Intercommunality: Civraisien en Poitou

Government
  - Mayor (2020–2026): Philippe Bellin
- Area^{1}: 83.22 km^{2} (32.13 sq mi)
- Highest elevation: 154 m (505 ft)
- Lowest elevation: 97 m (318 ft)
- Population (2023): 4,325
  - Density: 51.97/km^{2} (134.6/sq mi)
- Time zone: UTC+01:00 (CET)
  - Summer (DST): UTC+02:00 (CEST)
- INSEE/Postal code: 86082 /86700
- ^{1} French Land Register data, which excludes lakes, ponds, glaciers > 1 km^{2} (0.386 sq mi or 247 acres) and river estuaries.

Valence-en-Poitou (French pronunciation: [valɑ̃s ɑ̃ pwatu]) is a commune in the Vienne department in the Nouvelle-Aquitaine region in western France. It was established on 1 January 2019 by merger of the former communes of Couhé (the seat), Ceaux-en-Couhé, Châtillon, Payré and Vaux.

== Population ==
Population data refer to the area corresponding with the commune as of January 2025.

Historical population
Year	Pop.	±% p.a.
1968	4,428	—
1975	4,072	−1.19%
1982	3,913	−0.57%
1990	3,742	−0.56%
1999	3,896	+0.45%
2007	4,245	+1.08%
2012	4,343	+0.46%
2017	4,474	+0.60%
2023	4,325	−0.56%
Source: INSEE

== See also ==
- Communes of the Vienne department
