= Châtillon, Vienne =

Châtillon
- Part of Valence-en-Poitou
- Location of Châtillon
- Location within France Location within Nouvelle-Aquitaine
- Coordinates: 46°19′09″N 0°11′49″E
- Country: France
- Region: Nouvelle-Aquitaine
- Department: Vienne
- Arrondissement: Montmorillon
- Canton: Lusignan
- Commune: Valence-en-Poitou
- Area^{1}: 5.92 km^{2} (2.29 sq mi)
- Elevation: 200 m (660 ft)
- Highest elevation: 147 m (482 ft)
- Lowest elevation: 102 m (335 ft)
- Population (2022): 220
  - Density: 37/km^{2} (96/sq mi)
- Time zone: UTC+01:00 (CET)
  - Summer (DST): UTC+02:00 (CEST)
- Postal code: 86700
- ^{1} French Land Register data, which excludes lakes, ponds, glaciers > 1 km^{2} (0.386 sq mi or 247 acres) and river estuaries.

Châtillon (French pronunciation: [ʃatijɔ̃]) is a former commune in the Vienne department in the Nouvelle-Aquitaine region in western France. On 1 January 2019, it was merged into the new commune Valence-en-Poitou.

== See also ==
- Communes of the Vienne department
