= Couhé =

- Part of Valence-en-Poitou
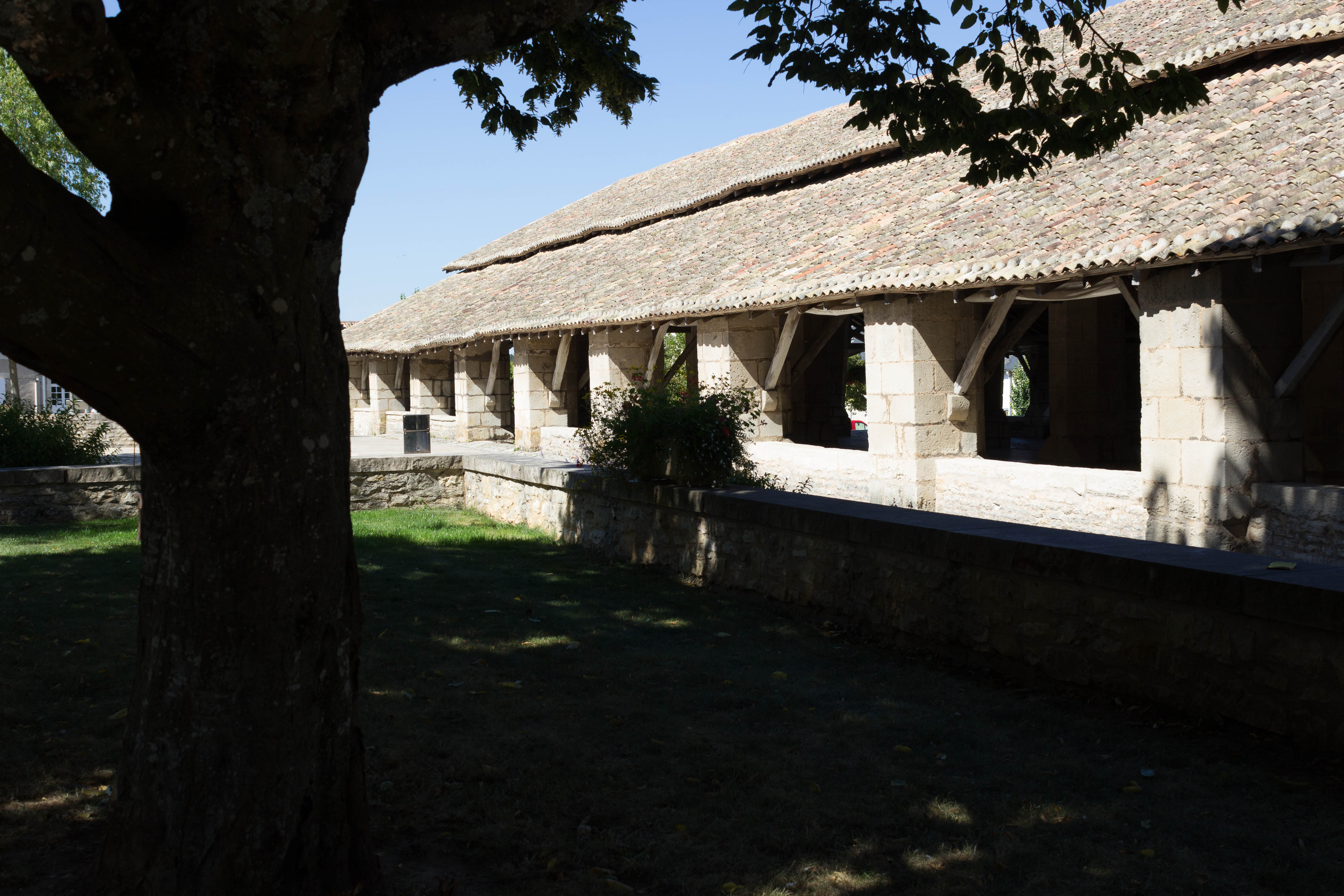
- The Halls of Couhé

- Coat of arms
- Location of Couhé
- Location within France Location within Nouvelle-Aquitaine
- Coordinates: 46°17′59″N 0°10′55″E
- Country: France
- Region: Nouvelle-Aquitaine
- Department: Vienne
- Arrondissement: Montmorillon
- Canton: Lusignan
- Commune: Valence-en-Poitou
- Area^{1}: 9.11 km^{2} (3.52 sq mi)
- Elevation: 139 m (456 ft)
- Highest elevation: 153 m (502 ft)
- Lowest elevation: 107 m (351 ft)
- Population (2022): 1,762
  - Density: 193/km^{2} (501/sq mi)
- Time zone: UTC+01:00 (CET)
  - Summer (DST): UTC+02:00 (CEST)
- Postal code: 86700
- ^{1} French Land Register data, which excludes lakes, ponds, glaciers > 1 km^{2} (0.386 sq mi or 247 acres) and river estuaries.

Couhé (French pronunciation: [ku.e]) is a former commune in the Vienne department in the Nouvelle-Aquitaine region in western France. On 1 January 2019, it was merged into the new commune Valence-en-Poitou. The neo-impressionist painter Édouard de Bergevin (1861–1925) was born in Couhé.

== See also ==
- Communes of the Vienne department
