= Fernand Renault =

French industrialist

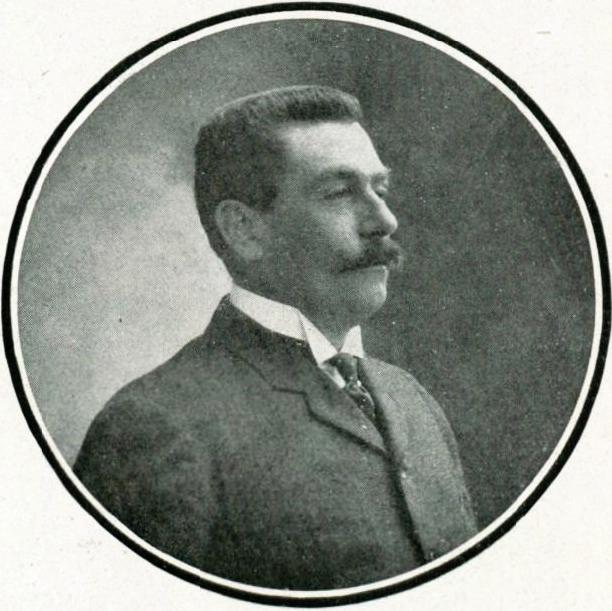
- Fernand Renault in 1909, the year of his death.
- Born: November 28, 1864; Paris, France
- Died: March 22, 1909 (aged 44); Paris, France
- Known for: Entrepreneur
- Father: Alfred Renault
- Relatives: Marcel Renault (brother); Louis Renault (brother); Henri Lefèvre-Pontalis (son-in-law); François Lehideux (son-in-law); Philippe Soupault (nephew)

Fernand Renault (28 November 1864 – 22 March 1909) was one of the brothers that founded the French automobile manufacturer Renault in 1899.

== Biography ==
Fernand played an important role in the development of the commercial network of Renault, particularly by creating the first subsidiaries in England, Belgium, Italy, Germany, Spain, and the United States.

In 1908, for health reasons, he sold his shares in Renault Frères to his brother Louis, who renamed it Société des Automobiles Louis Renault.

After a long illness, he died in 1909.

== Family ==
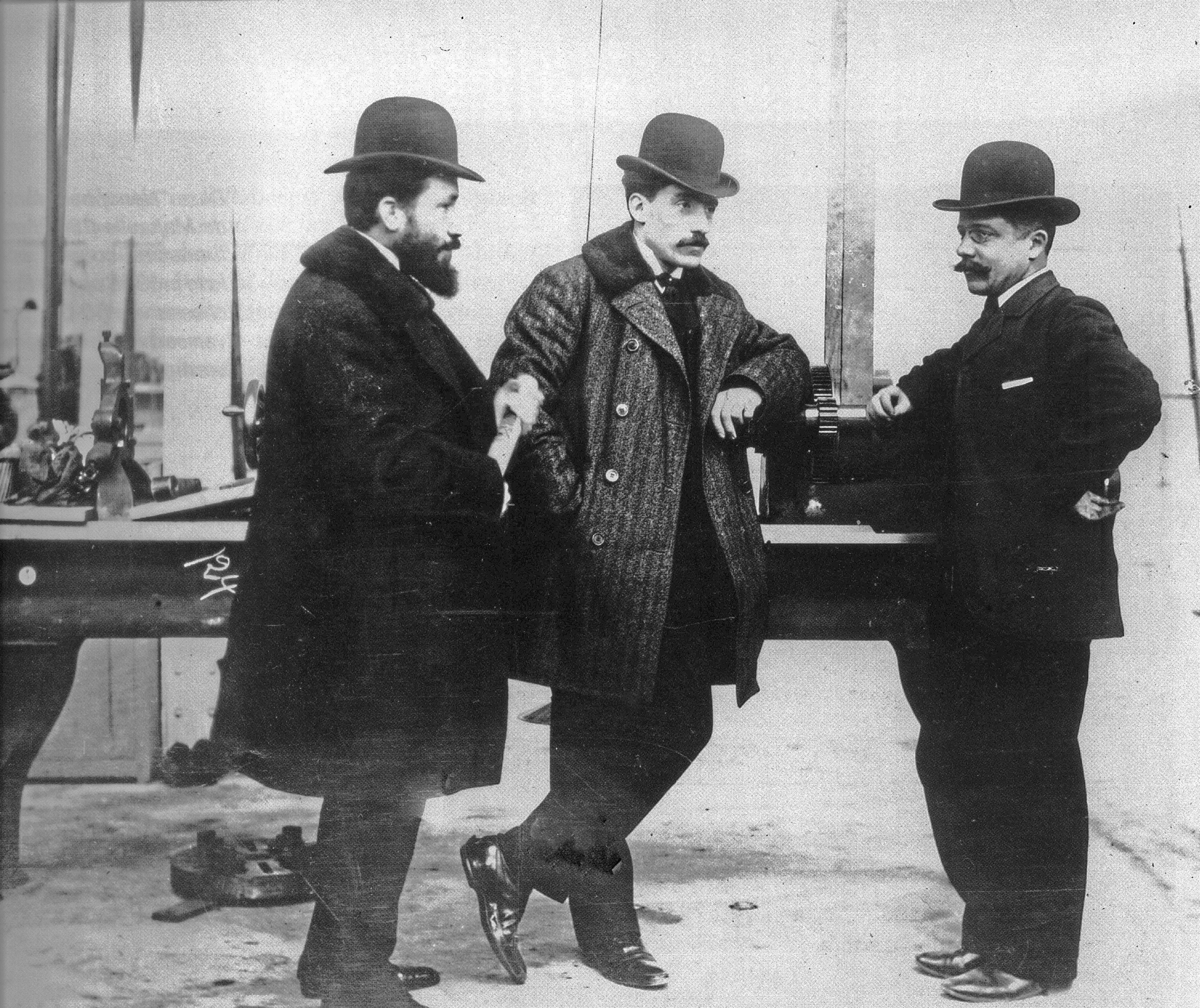
The three Renault brothers

On June 1, 1891, he married Charlotte Marie Louise Dancognée, the daughter of a lawyer and aunt of Philippe Soupault. Together they had two daughters:

- Fernande (1895–1992), married in 1918 to Henri Lefèvre-Pontalis
- Françoise (1908–1986), married in 1929 to François Lehideux (1904–1998), company director and minister; together they had four children:
  - Patrick Lehideux (born 1930), husband of Michèle Arnaud (1919–1998), artist and television producer
  - Gérald Lehideux
  - Marie-France Lehideux
  - Maitchou Lehideux, wife of Count Jacques-Alain de Sédouy
