= Jean Bichelonne =

French businessman

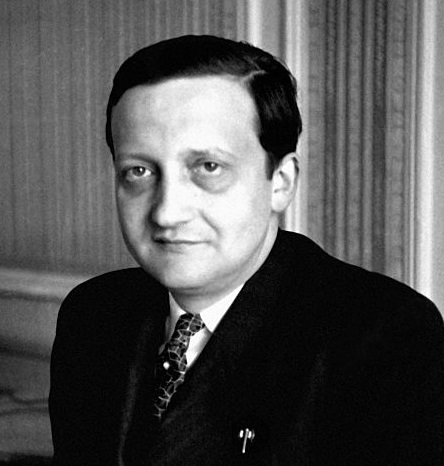
- Jean Bichelonne ca. 1940.
- Born: 24 December 1904; Bordeaux, France
- Died: 22 December 1944 (aged 39); Hohenlychen Sanatorium, Lychen, Nazi Germany
- Education: École Polytechnique
- Occupations: Businessman, politician

Jean Bichelonne (24 December 1904 – 22 December 1944) was a French businessman and member of the Vichy government that governed France during World War II following the occupation of France by Nazi Germany.

== Early life ==
Jean Bichelonne was born on December 24, 1904, in Bordeaux. He graduated from the École Polytechnique.

== Career ==
Bichelonne gained an early reputation for his brilliant organisational skill as well as his photographic memory.

In 1937, he became member of the cabinet of the minister for public works, Henri Queuille. In 1939, he became chief of staff to Raoul Dautry, then Defence Minister. He was a member of the French delegation in the armistice commission (the Armistice of 22 June 1940 was a de facto surrender).

Following the establishment of Vichy, Bichelonne was, in September 1940, appointed head of the Office central de repartition des produits industriels, a body that determined how raw materials would be proportioned between the newly established corporatist bodies in charge of each industrial sector. Along with the likes of Jacques Barnaud, François Lehideux and Pierre Pucheu, Bichelonne was a member of a group of technocrats who held important positions in the early days of the Vichy regime. Like Pucheu he was devotee of Saint-Simonianism, the belief in industrialisation as the motor of progress in society, a belief that was not shared by the rural traditionalist Philippe Pétain.

In the government of Pierre Laval the Ministry of Industry was headed by Jean Bichelonne with Henri Lafond as General Secretary for Energy and René Norguet (1888–1968) as General Secretary for Industrial Production. Lafond's Energy secretariat included sections for mines, steel, gas/electricity and fuel. As Minister of Industrial Production, Bichelonne faced the problem of demands for slave labour from the Nazi Labour Deployment Minister Fritz Sauckel, and the impact it was having on French industry. He managed to overcome this difficulty by securing an agreement with Albert Speer in September 1943 to the effect that the entire French industrial sector would be Sperrbetrieben, making it effectively off limits to Sauckel.

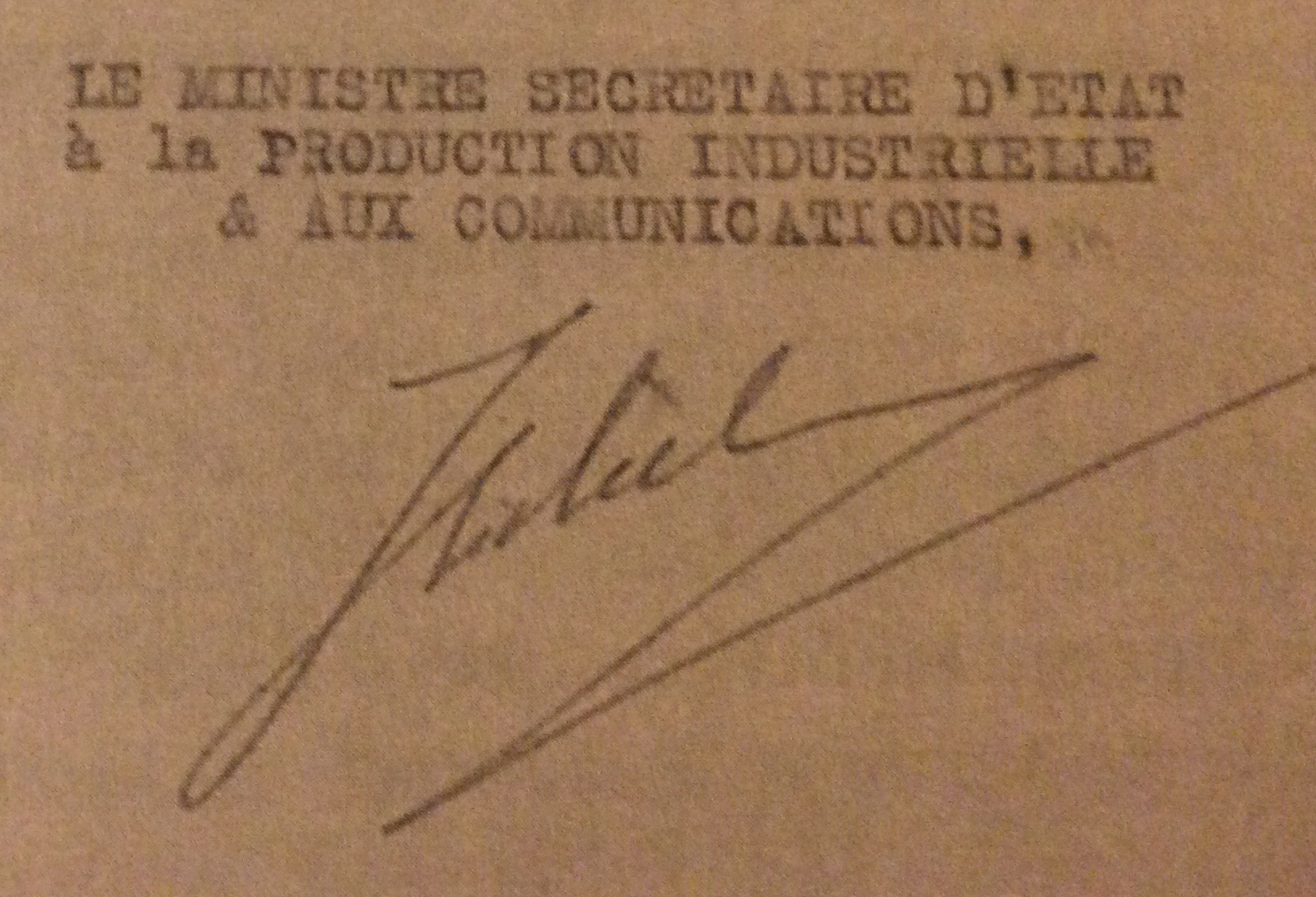
Bichelonne's signature, Feb. 1943

Bichelonne was one of the cabinet members taken under SS guard from Vichy to Belfort on the night of 17–18 August 1944 as the Nazis desperately sought to maintain the collaborationist government by any means necessary. Moved to the Sigmaringen enclave, Bichelonne fell ill and was sent to the SS hospital at Hohenlychen.

== Death ==
Bichelonne died on 22 December 1944. It was officially recorded that he died of a pulmonary embolism, but unsubstantiated rumors suggest that he may have been assassinated. Albert Speer referred to these rumors in his book Inside The Third Reich; Speer was hospitalized and also diagnosed with a pulmonary embolism. Coincidentally, the same doctor who would treat Bichelonne treated Speer and happened to maintain a close friendship with Heinrich Himmler.

== Sources ==
- Fischesser, Raymond, Groupe LAFOND (in French), Annales des Mines
