= Ceaux-en-Couhé =

- Part of Valence-en-Poitou
- Location of Ceaux-en-Couhé
- Location within France Location within Nouvelle-Aquitaine
- Coordinates: 46°19′20″N 0°13′55″E
- Country: France
- Region: Nouvelle-Aquitaine
- Department: Vienne
- Arrondissement: Montmorillon
- Canton: Lusignan
- Commune: Valence-en-Poitou
- Area^{1}: 16.22 km^{2} (6.26 sq mi)
- Elevation: 130 m (430 ft)
- Highest elevation: 150 m (490 ft)
- Lowest elevation: 102 m (335 ft)
- Population (2022): 527
  - Density: 32.5/km^{2} (84.2/sq mi)
- Time zone: UTC+01:00 (CET)
  - Summer (DST): UTC+02:00 (CEST)
- Postal code: 86700
- ^{1} French Land Register data, which excludes lakes, ponds, glaciers > 1 km^{2} (0.386 sq mi or 247 acres) and river estuaries.

Ceaux-en-Couhé (French pronunciation: [so ɑ̃ ku.e]) is a former commune in the Vienne department in the Nouvelle-Aquitaine region in western France. On 1 January 2019, it was merged into the new commune Valence-en-Poitou.

== See also ==
- Communes of the Vienne department
