= Léon Barnaud =

French naval officer

- Born: 28 December 1845; Antibes, France
- Died: 29 August 1909 (aged 63); Antibes, France
- Military career
- Allegiance: France
- Branch: French Navy

Léon Barnaud (French pronunciation: [le.ɔ̃ baʁno]; 28 December 1845 – 29 August 1909) was a French naval officer, father of Pierre Barnaud and Jacques Barnaud.

== Early life ==
Léon Barnaud was born in 1845 in Antibes as the son of Jean-Joseph Barnaud, merchant, and Delphine Christine. His foster father was Vice-amiral Jean-Charles-Alexandre Sallandrouze de Lamornaix (1840–1899).

== Naval career ==
Barnaud entered the École Navale (Naval School) in 1862 and became an aspirant on 2 October 1865. From 2 October 1867, he was a ship's sign on the Sybille, then on the Loiret. In 1873, he was assigned to the rifle battalion of Lorient where he was promoted to lieutenant on August 3, 1875; he followed the courses of the School of Pyrotechnics and then of the School of Underwater Defenses, before serving on the ironclad Gauloise in squadron of evolutions from 1878 to 1879. He was awarded Knight of the Legion of Honor on 11 July 1880.

In 1881, he was posted to Toulon. In 1882, he was on a mission to Chile to observe the passage of Venus. In 1883, he became aide-de-camp to the Maritime prefect of the 3rd arrondissement of Lorient. Appointed on 3 October 1884, on 1 January 1886, he took command of the gunboat Massue in French Indochina.

In 1887, he became an officer of the Minister for the Navy.

On May 12, 1888, he became second-in-command of the frigate on the ironclads Victorieuse and Dévastation; he was awarded Officer of the Legion of Honor on December 30, 1890; in 1891, he took command of the protected cruisers Forbin, then Lalande in the Mediterranean Wing.

On 1 January 1894, he was reassigned to Toulon, where he was promoted to captain on 14 March 1895 and in the process, he became director of submarine defenses in the 5th maritime district.

From 20 September 1897, he assumed command of the ironclad Courbet in the Northern Squadron. In 1901 and 1902, he was commanding the protected cruiser Protet and the Pacific Naval Division, before being appointed rear admiral on 21 October 1902.

In 1903, he was appointed president of the Standing Commission for the Control and Revision of Armament Regulations, member of the Navy Advisory Committee and the Lighthouse Commission. From late 1903 to 1905, he commanded a division of the Mediterranean Wing with his flag on the pre-dreadnought battleship Iéna.

From 1906, he was responsible for the services of the armed fleet; he was named Commander of the Legion of Honor on 13 July 1906; he was promoted to vice-admiral in August 1907 and became president of the Navy Technical Committee on November 9 of the same year and in 1909, also president of the Hydrographic Committee. Barnaud died on 29 August 1909 in Antibes.

== Bibliography ==
- Taillemite, Etienne (1982). Dictionnaire des marins français. Paris: Editions maritimes et d'Outre-Mer. OCLC 470113586.
