= Louis Renault (industrialist) =

French industrialist (1877–1944)

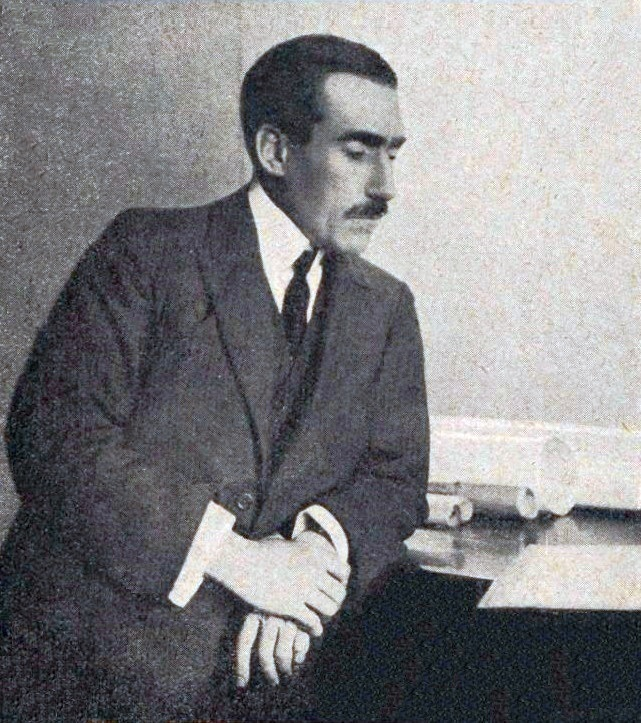
- Louis Renault in 1918
- Born: 12 February 1877; Paris, France
- Died: 24 October 1944 (aged 67); Fresnes Prison, Fresnes, France
- Occupations: Industrialist, businessman
- Known for: Co-founder of Renault
- Relatives: Marcel Renault (brother); Fernand Renault (brother)
- Awards: Legion of Honor

Louis Renault (French pronunciation: [lwi ʁəno]; 12 February 1877 – 24 October 1944) was a French industrialist, one of the founders of Renault, and a pioneer of the automobile industry.

Renault built one of France's largest automobile manufacturing concerns, which still bears his name. During World War I his factories contributed massively to the war effort, notably so by the creation and manufacture of the first tank of modern configuration, the Renault FT tank.

Accused of collaborating with the Germans during World War II, he died while awaiting trial in liberated France toward the end of 1944 under uncertain circumstances. His company was seized and nationalized by the provisional government of France, although he died before he could be tried. His factories were the only ones permanently expropriated by the French government.

In 1956, Time magazine described Renault as "rich, powerful and famous, cantankerous, brilliant, often brutal, the little Napoleon of an automaking empire — vulgar, loud, domineering, impatient, he was a terror to associates, a friend to practically none," adding that to the French working man, Renault became known as "the ogre of Billancourt."

== Early life and career ==
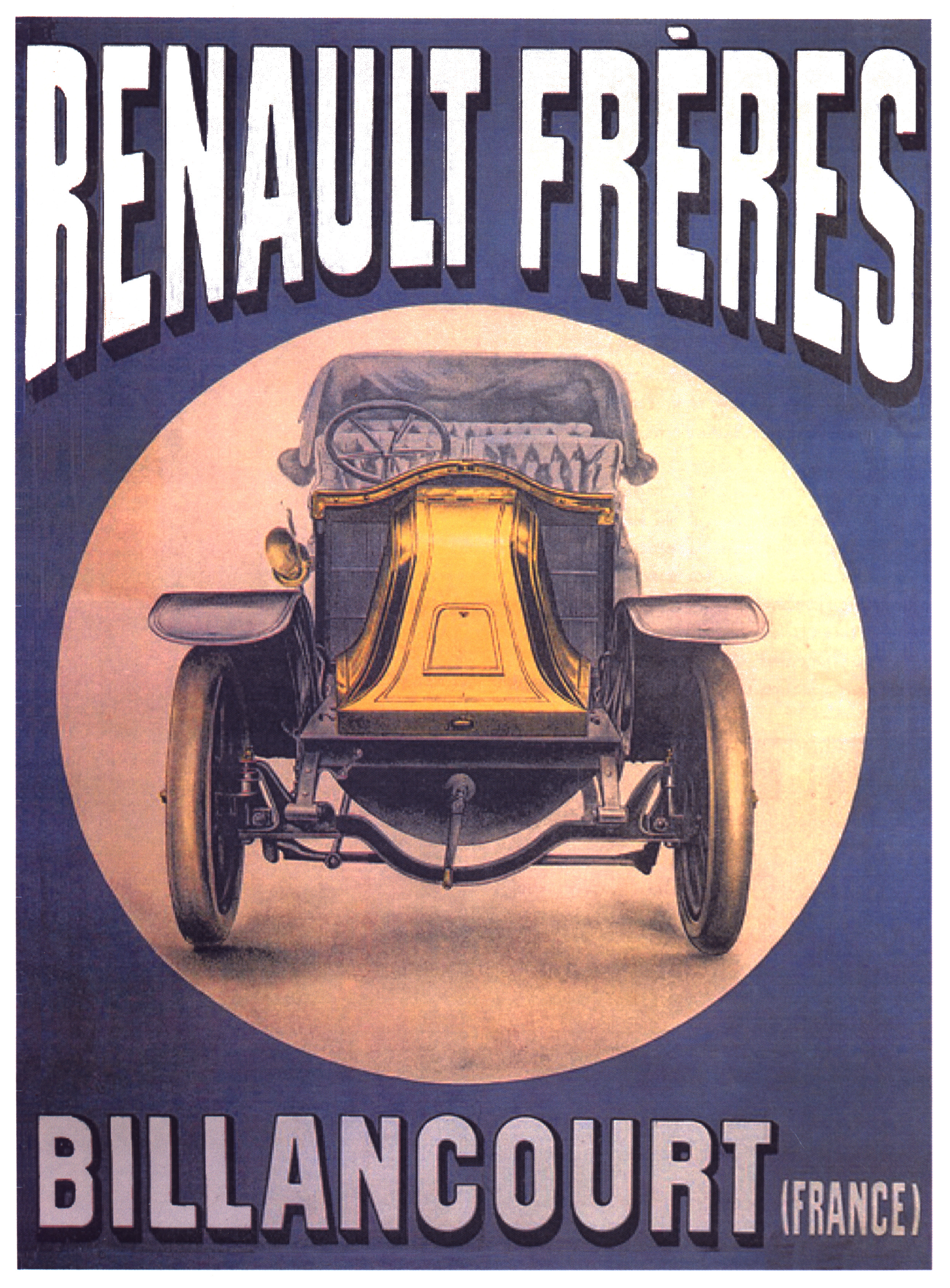
Advertisement for Renault Frères

The fourth of six children born into the bourgeois Parisian family of Alfred and Berthe Renault, Louis Renault attended Lycée Condorcet. He was fascinated by engineering and mechanics from an early age and spent hours in the Serpollet steam car workshop or tinkering with old Panhard engines in the tool shed of the family's second home in Billancourt.

He built his first car in 1898, hiring a pair of workmen to modify a used 3/4 hp (560 W) De Dion-Bouton cycle which featured a revolutionary universally jointed driveshaft and a three-speed gearbox with reverse, with the third gear in direct drive (which he patented a year later). Renault called his car the Voiturette. On 24 December 1898, he won a bet with his friends that his invention with an innovative driveshaft could beat a car with a bicycle-like chain drive up the slope of Rue Lepic in Montmartre. As well as winning the bet, Renault received 13 definite orders for the vehicle.

Seeing the commercial potential, he teamed up with his two older brothers, Marcel and Fernand, who had business experience from working in their father's button and textiles firm. They formed the Renault Frères company on 25 February 1899. Initially, business and administration was handled entirely by the elder brothers, with Louis dedicating himself to design and manufacturing. Marcel was killed in the 1903 Paris-Madrid motor race, and in 1908, Louis Renault took overall control of the company after Fernand retired for health reasons. Fernand subsequently died in 1909.

=== Marriage ===
On 26 September 1918, Renault, then aged 40, married the 21-year-old Christiane Boullaire (1897–1979), sister of French painter Jacques Boullaire. They had a son, Jean-Louis (24 January 1920 – 1982). They kept homes at 90 Avenue Foch (formerly Avenue du Bois-de-Boulogne) in Paris and a country estate near Saint-Pierre-du-Vauvray, Rouen, in the department of Eure, called the Chateau de la Batellerie à Herqueville or simply Chateau Herqueville. The Chateau fronted more than 3 km of the Seine, the entire grounds comprising 4,000 hectares. At Renault's request and expense, the small town hall of Herqueville was moved. Renault's personnel entered the residence via a tunnel.

Locations of Chateau Herqueville: 49°14′31.66″N 1°15′24.55″E

== World War I, interwar period and developments ==
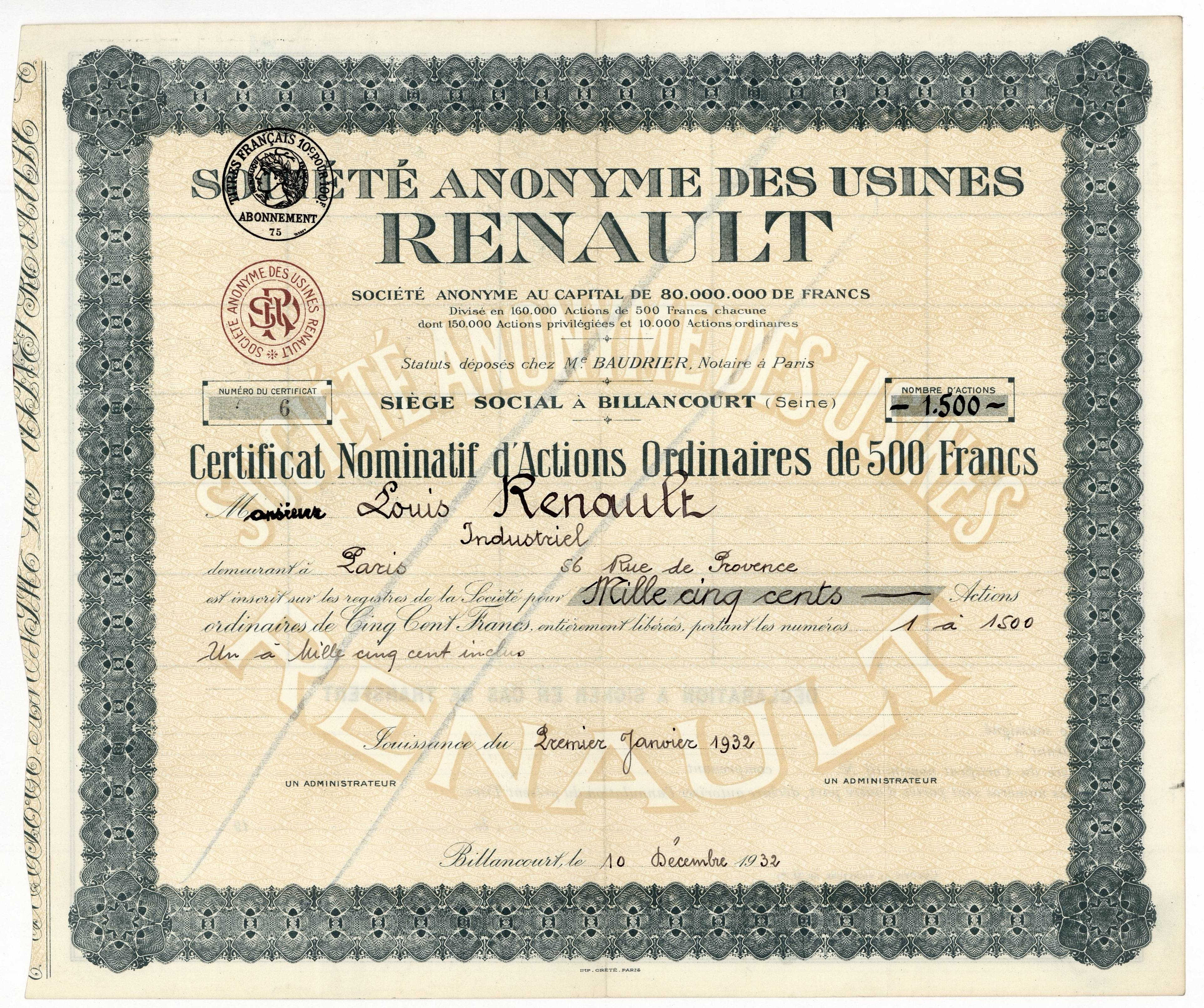
Share of the SA des Usines Renault, issued 1. January 1932 to Louis Renault

At the start of the First World War, in August 1914, in response to the then acute shortage of artillery ammunition, Renault suggested that car factories such as Renault could manufacture 75 mm shells using hydraulic presses rather than with the usual longer and costlier lathe operations. Identical methods were also used by Andre Citroën in his own factory. The resulting shells helped overcome the shortages, but as they had to be manufactured in two pieces they were inherently weak at the base thus sometimes letting hot gases detonate the melinite inside the shell. Over 600 French 75 mm guns were destroyed by premature explosions in 1915, and their crews killed or injured.

Louis Renault was decorated with the Grand Cross of the Légion d'honneur after the war for the major contribution of his factories to the war effort. His factories' mass production in 1918 of the revolutionary and highly effective Renault FT tank, which he had personally designed with Rodolphe Ernst-Metzmaier, was perhaps Renault's most significant contribution during that period.

During the interwar period, his right-wing opinions became well known, leading to various cases of labour unrest with proletarian avant-garde workers at the Boulogne Billancourt plant. He pleaded for a necessary union between European nations.

Louis Renault competed fiercely with Citroën, whom he called "le petit Juif" ("the little Jew"), growing increasingly paranoid and reclusive at the same time, and deeply concerned about the rising power of Communism and labor unions, eventually retreating to his country estate, a castle on the river Seine near Rouen.

Renault remained in complete control of his company until 1942, dealing with its rapid expansion while designing several new inventions, most of which are still in use today, such as hydraulic shock absorbers, the modern drum brake and compressed gas ignition.

== World War II, arrest and death ==
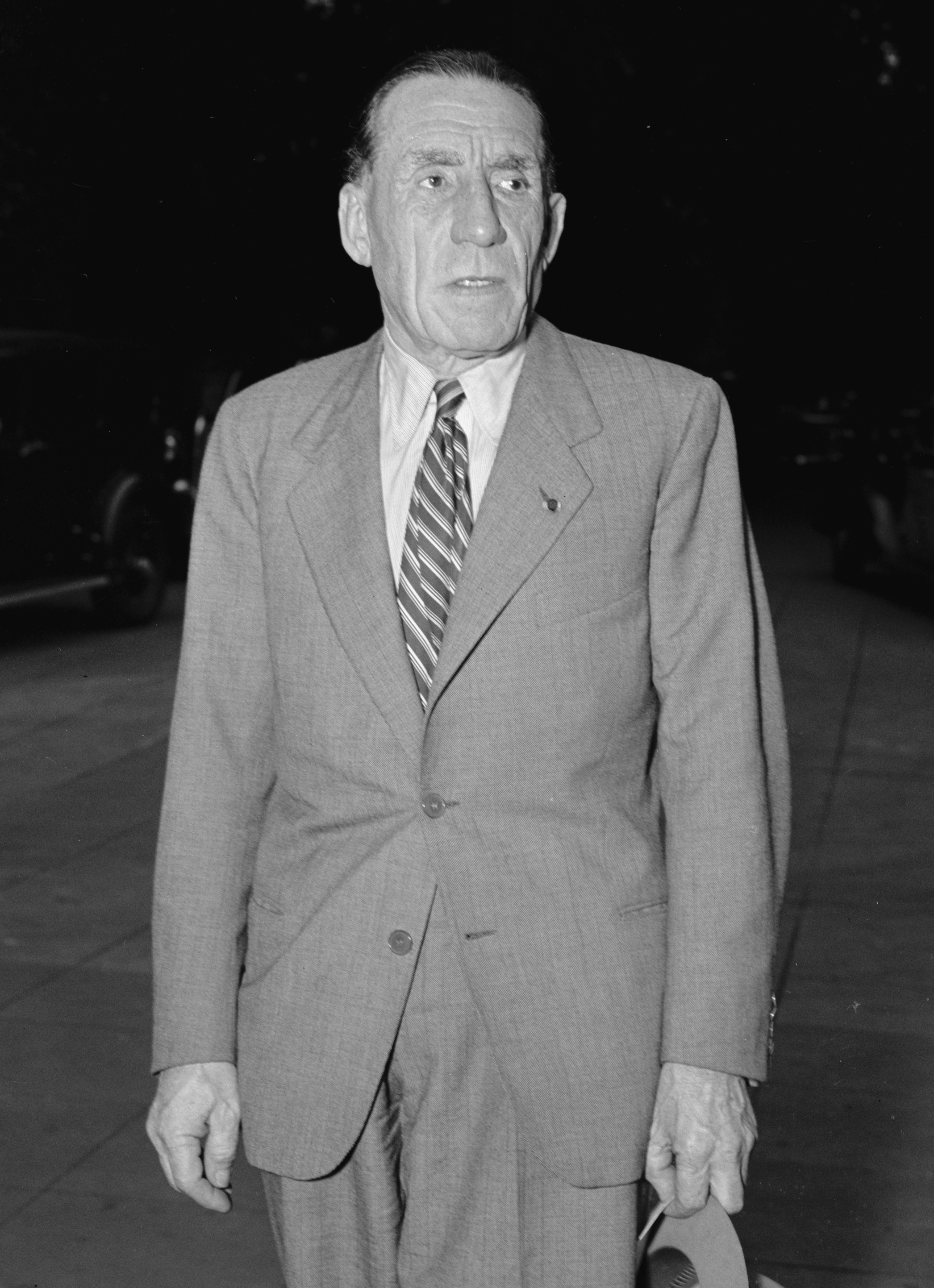
Louis Renault in Washington, June 1940

In 1938, Renault visited Adolf Hitler and, by 1939, he had become an important supplier for the French army. When Hitler's Wehrmacht invaded France in 1940, Renault was in the U.S., having been sent by his government to ask for tanks. He returned to find the Franco-German armistice in place. Renault was faced with the choice of cooperating with the Germans and possibly forestalling them from moving his factory and equipment to Germany, which would lead to an accusation of collaboration with the enemy. He put his factories at the service of Vichy France, which meant that he was also viewed as assisting the Nazis. Over a period of four years, Renault manufactured 34,232 vehicles for the Germans. He argued that "by continuing operations he had saved thousands of workers from being transported to Germany", but, in 1942, Life described him as a "notorious Paris collaborationist".

During the occupation of France the company was under the control of the Germans, with people from Daimler-Benz in key positions. Renault himself became unpopular among members of the French resistance. The Renault factories on Île Seguin in Billancourt had become top priority targets for the bombers of the Royal Air Force (RAF) and were ultimately severely damaged on 3 March 1942. Renault's health issues worsened, including his severely diminished renal function and, in late 1942, he suffered aphasia, and became unable to speak or write.

Three weeks after France was liberated in 1944, Renault surrendered "on condition that he would not be jailed until indicted". He was arrested outside Paris on 22 September 1944, on charges of industrial collaboration with Nazi Germany. At the time of his arrest, Renault "denied that his firm had received $120,000,000 from the Germans for war materials, said that he had kept his huge, much-bombed plant going at the request of Vichy to keep its materials and equipment out of Nazi hands and to save workers from deportation." He was incarcerated in Paris's Fresnes Prison, being already seriously ill at the time. The records for the exact period of his incarceration at Fresnes would later turn out to be missing. Renault was moved on 5 October to a psychiatric hospital at Ville-Evrard in Neuilly-sur-Marne.

When Renault's health quickly declined on 9 October 1944 he was again moved to a private nursing home at the clinic Saint-Jean-de-Dieu in the Rue Oudinot, Paris at the request of his family and supporters, having gone into a coma. He died on 24 October 1944, four weeks after his incarceration, still awaiting trial and having claimed to have been mistreated in Fresnes Prison, with his 1918 French Legion of Honor, for exceptional contribution to the victory of the First World War, having been expunged by the Vichy régime.

No autopsy was performed and the exact cause of Renault's death remains unclear. An official report at the time gave the cause of death as uremia. Later, in 1956, his wife claimed that Renault died from beatings and torture at the hands of prison guards.

Louis Renault is buried at his country home Chateau Herqueville, in Herqueville dans l'Eure.

== Expropriation ==
In October 1944, the provisional French government seized Louis Renault's company. The Minister of Information, Henri Teitgen, said at the time this was not a confiscation, rather "it was merely a step to get French industry back into production. Later a commission would examine the books, confiscate war profits, bring charges."

On 1 January 1945, four months after Louis Renault's death, an order of General Charles de Gaulle's provisional government decreed the dissolution of Société Anonyme des Usines Renault and its nationalization, giving it the new name Régie Nationale des Usines Renault (RNUR).

Thus, the company Louis Renault had created was nationalized on the official case of collaboration. Renault was charged posthumously with "guilty enrichment obtained by those who worked for the enemy".

== Aftermath and controversy ==
In 1944, after the expropriation of his company and his subsequent death, Renault's last will and testament was opened to reveal that he had left his company to his 40,000 employees. At the time the company was nationalized, Renault's wife Christiane and her son Jean-Louis owned 95% of the company stock and had received nothing, while the other stockholders were in fact compensated. By 1956, "Renault [was] now France's largest nationalized company, employing 51,000 Frenchmen, making 200,000 automobiles and a profit of $11 million a year."

The director of the plant during the war obtained a judgment in 1949 stating that he and the plant had not collaborated.

In 1956, Renault's widow, Christiane Renault, claimed that Louis Renault was murdered and sought "to establish that Louis Renault was another of the more than 9,000 Frenchmen listed by the government as having been killed by "irregular executions" in the post-Liberation vengeance, and Louis Renault's body was subsequently exhumed for autopsy. Madam Renault cited as evidence "a report showing Renault's urea content to be normal a week before his death, and an X-ray showing a fractured vertebra."

In 2005, the London Daily Telegraph reported that "according to eyewitness and family accounts, the previously wiry little 67-year-old had been tortured and beaten," and that "a nun at Fresnes testified that she saw Renault collapse after being hit over the head by a jailer wielding a helmet. An X-ray organised by his family indicated a broken neck vertebra."

In 2005, The Daily Telegraph said Renault had "felt that his duty was to preserve France's manufacturing base. Military and Daimler-Benz officials arrived at the gates of his Billancourt factory to assess it for removal into Germany, together with its workforce. Renault fended them off by agreeing to make vehicles for the Wehrmacht." According to Anthony Rhodes's Louis Renault: A Biography, Renault once said of the Germans "It is better to give them the butter, or they'll take the cows." The 2005 Daily Telegraph report said Renault attempted to save his company from displacement and absorption by Daimler-Benz: "But for his efforts, Renault factories and employees would have been shipped to Germany."

Subsequent studies have shown that while Renault had collaborated, "he also hived off strategic materials and sabotaged trucks. Dipsticks were marked low, for example, and engines dried and seized in action, an outcome much in evidence on the Russian Front." Suggestions that Renault management had slowed production for German occupiers was countered with the argument that workers rather than management had organized the production slow-downs. A 2005 article in The Daily Telegraph said it could legally be argued that the Renault company, the "jewel in the country’s industrial crown" was procured by theft, and that "admission that Louis Renault and his company had received rough justice would raise the question of compensation – huge compensation."

In 2011, Patrick Fridenson, a business history professor at the École des Hautes Études en Sciences Sociales in Paris and the author of a book on Renault said “It's extremely difficult to say to what extent Louis Renault should be considered a collaborator, he ran the risk of complete dispossession if he resisted the Germans.” Scholar Monika Ostler Riess, who had studied French and German sources found no evidence that Mr. Renault collaborated any more than his peers. “He just tried to save what he had, what he had built. The alternative to cooperating with the occupiers was to see the Germans take over his company".

Robert Paxton suggested in his 1972 book, Vichy France: old guard and new order: 1940–1944, that the Renault factory might have been returned to Louis Renault and his family, had he lived longer. The Berliet truck factory in Lyon remained in Marius Berliet's family possession, despite his having manufactured 2,330 trucks for the Germans. Marius Berliet, who died in 1949, had, however, "stubbornly refused to recognize legal actions against him after the war."

On 29 July 1967, Louis-Jean Renault, the only heir, received minor compensation, specifically for non-industrial, personal losses. In 1982, representatives of the Organisation civile et militaire and their counterparts at the company Robert de Longcamps, worked in vain for the rehabilitation of Louis Renault, saying he had been "wrongfully accused of collaboration with the enemy", their requests to Robert Badinter, French Minister of Justice, unheeded.

Renault's were the only factories permanently expropriated by the French government. As of 2005, Renault officials avoid mention of Louis Renault. For the centennial in 1999 of the original Renault Frères company, celebrated by Régie Renault, the company ignored the grandchildren of Louis Renault.

Despite the French Declaration of the Rights of Man and of the Citizen, which mandates just and preliminary compensation before expropriation, Louis Renault and his heirs were otherwise never officially compensated for their company. Renault returned to the private sector as a Société Anonyme (S.A) in 1996 when the French government sold 80% of the company.

In 2011, his heirs again sought to restore Renault's reputation and receive compensation for what they see as the illegal confiscation of his company by the state.
