= Payré =

- Part of Valence-en-Poitou
- Location of Payré
- Location within France Location within Nouvelle-Aquitaine
- Coordinates: 46°20′27″N 0°12′41″E
- Country: France
- Region: Nouvelle-Aquitaine
- Department: Vienne
- Arrondissement: Montmorillon
- Canton: Lusignan
- Commune: Valence-en-Poitou
- Area^{1}: 26.13 km^{2} (10.09 sq mi)
- Elevation: 130 m (430 ft)
- Highest elevation: 154 m (505 ft)
- Lowest elevation: 97 m (318 ft)
- Population (2022): 1,028
  - Density: 39.34/km^{2} (101.9/sq mi)
- Time zone: UTC+01:00 (CET)
  - Summer (DST): UTC+02:00 (CEST)
- Postal code: 86700
- ^{1} French Land Register data, which excludes lakes, ponds, glaciers > 1 km^{2} (0.386 sq mi or 247 acres) and river estuaries.

Payré (French pronunciation: [pɛʁe]) is a former commune in the Vienne department in the Nouvelle-Aquitaine region in western France. On 1 January 2019, it was merged into the new commune Valence-en-Poitou.

== See also ==
- Communes of the Vienne department
