= Bernard Lehideux =

French politician (born 1944)

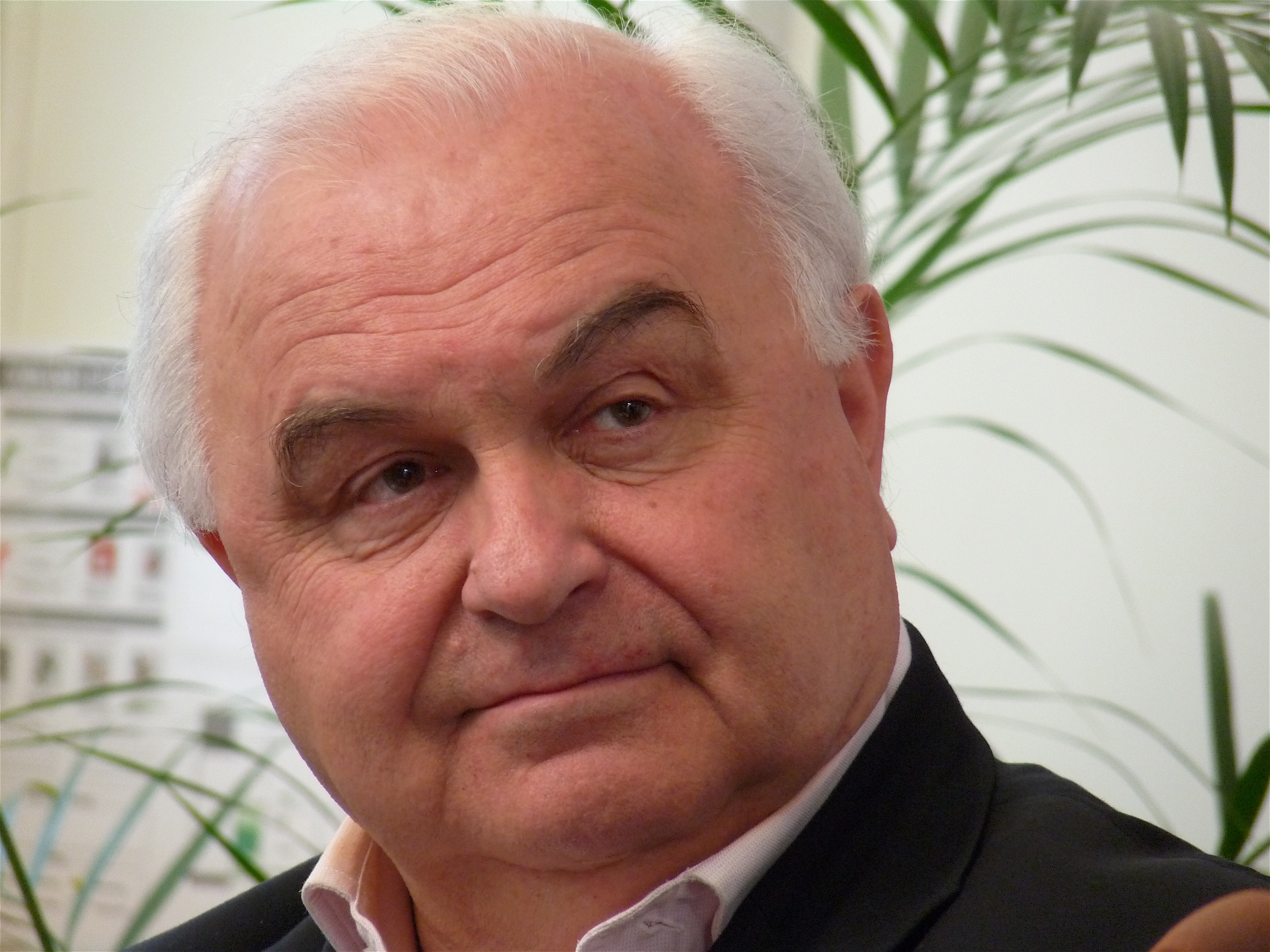
Bernard Lehideux in 2009

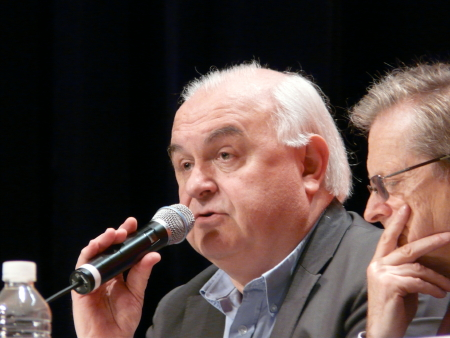
Bernard Lehideux at a MoDem Convention on Europe, in Paris in 2008

Bernard Lehideux (born 23 September 1944 in Paris) is a French politician and Member of the European Parliament for the Île-de-France. He is a member of the Union for French Democracy, which is part of the Alliance of Liberals and Democrats for Europe, and sits on the European Parliament's Committee on Employment and Social Affairs. He is also a substitute for the Committee on Development, a member of the delegation to the ACP-EU Joint Parliamentary Assembly, and a substitute for the delegation to the EU–Chile Joint Parliamentary Committee. Of particular note, he is a nephew of François Lehideux.

== Career ==
- Head of the office of Michel Poniatowski, Secretary-General of the Independent Republicans (1969)
- Special adviser to Michel d'Ornano, Secretary-General of the Independent Republicans (1973)
- National secretary of the Independent Republicans, then of the Republican Party, with responsibility for relations with the press and internal information (1976)
- Member of the Economic and Social Council (1979–1984)
- Secretary-General of the 'Perspectives et Réalités' clubs (1990–1993)
- Member of the Council of Paris (1983–1995)
- Chairman of the UDF Group on the Île-de-France Regional Council (1992–1995)
- First Vice-Chairman of the Île-de-France Regional Council (1995–1998)
- Member of the European Parliament (1998–1999)
- Vice-Chairman of the European Parliament Committee on Development|Committee on Development and Cooperation

== Political groups ==
- 25 April 1998 – 19 July 1999 : Group of the European People's Party (Christian-Democratic Group) – Member
- 20 July 2004 – 13 July 2009 : Group of the Alliance of Liberals and Democrats for Europe – Member

== National parties ==
- 25 April 1998 – 19 July 1999 : Union pour la démocratie française – Démocratie libérale (France)
- 20 July 2004 – 27 March 2008 : Union pour la démocratie française (France)
- 28 March 2008 – 13 July 2009 : Mouvement Démocrate (France)
