= François Lehideux =

French industrialist (1904–1998)

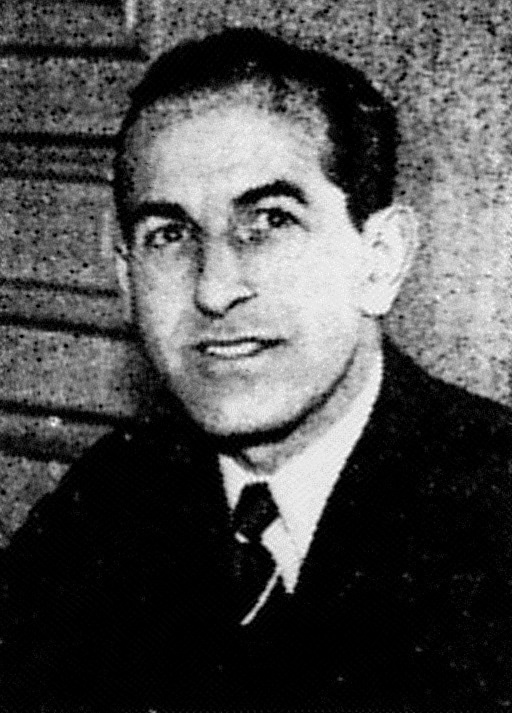
- François Lehideux in 1940
- Born: 30 January 1904; Paris, France
- Died: 21 June 1998 (aged 94); Paris, France
- Occupation: Industrialist
- Employer(s): Renault; Ford Motor Company
- Known for: Official in Vichy France
- Title: Minister of Industrial Production
- Term: July 1941 – April 1942
- Relatives: Fernand Renault (father-in-law); Bernard Lehideux (nephew)

François Lehideux (30 January 1904 – 21 June 1998) was a French industrialist and member of the Vichy government.

== Car industry ==
In 1929 Lehideux married the daughter of Fernand Renault, and soon became a leading figure in the Renault car company. He was assistant to Louis Renault and in this position convinced the head of the company to employ André Lefèbvre within the development department, Lehideux admiring Lefèbvre's bold ideas and feeling that Renault needed to modernise its designs in order to continue to lead the way in French automobile manufacture.

During his time with Renault, Lehideux made no secret of his ambition. A year after the outbreak of war Louis Renault held a meeting, on 3 September 1940, with the country's new leader, of Philippe Pétain, at which Renault received the reassurance he sought that the government wished him to remain at the head of his company. Renault at this time was greatly concerned that his brother's son in law, François Lehideux, was scheming with political contacts to take the top job at Renault. The incident also reflects the extent to which the right wing government of Pétain shared the interventionist approach to industry that had been evident in his left wing predecessor, prime minister Léon Blum, five years earlier. Government interventionism would be an important part of the story of the French auto-industry, most particularly regarding the Renault business itself, in the post-war decades. Following his unsuccessful pitch for the top job it was Lehideux who now left the company.

== Vichy ==
In October 1940 Lehideux was appointed to the headship of the COA, an organisation charged with smoothing relations between the German authorities and French auto-makers. He is credited with having successfully intervened in 1943 to block German plans to crate up Ford's newly completed car plant at Poissy for shipment to the company's Cologne location.

Along with the likes of Jacques Barnaud, Jean Bichelonne and Pierre Pucheu Lehideux was a member of a group of technocrats who were important in the early days of the Vichy regime. These individuals, sometimes known as jeunes cyclistes, advocated extensive economic reform in order that France could restore its position in Europe.

In 1941 he was given charge of a new body, the Direction Générale de l'équipement nationale, the purpose of which was to improve the economy and overcome high unemployment. In his role as leader of this body Lehideux produced a ten-year plan for the economic development and growth of France, which somehow inspired the plan Monnet after the war.

Lehideux served as Minister of Industrial Production, resigning when Pierre Laval returned to government.

== Post-war ==
He was arrested after the Second World War but freed in 1946. On 17 February 1949 all charges against him were dropped by the High Court of Justice on grounds of "insufficient evidence": He had provided protection for members of the OCF. By now he was returning to a successful career in business. Indeed, the Ford Motor Company appointed him managing director of their French operations in 1950, succeeding Maurice Dollfus, a controversial decision which sparked a hostile reaction that encouraged Ford to sell its French arm to Simca in 1954.

Lehideux defended his involvement in Vichy after the war. He also became involved in the Association for the Defence of the Memory of Marshal Pétain, a group that campaigned for a reassessment of Petain. At his death at the age of 95 in June 1998 Lehideux was the final surviving minister of the Vichy regime.

== Cited sources ==
- Michael Curtis (2003) Verdict on Vichy, London: Phoenix. ISBN 1628724366.
