= Jacques Barnaud =

French businessman

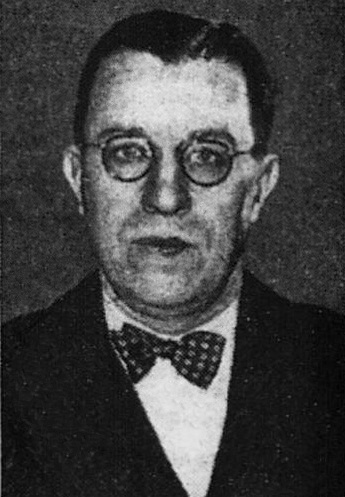
Jacques Barnaud in 1941

Jacques Barnaud (French pronunciation: [ʒak baʁno]; 24 February 1893, Antibes – 15 April 1962, Paris) was a French banker, businessman, and member of the collaborationist Vichy regime during the Second World War.

A graduate of the École Polytechnique, Barnaud worked for the Banque Worms as an executive from 1928 to 1939.

He was enthusiastic about the Vichy regime, and following the appointment of François Darlan as Prime Minister of France in February 1941, Barnaud was brought into the government as Delegate General for Franco-German Economic Relations. Along with the likes of Jean Bichelonne, François Lehideux, and Pierre Pucheu, he was a member of a group of technocrats who were important in the early days of the Vichy regime.

Barnaud worked with Nazi Germany during the occupation in order to secure deals to supply them with aluminium and rubber from French Indo-China. He did, however, successfully oppose a plan suggested by Hermann Göring that the Nazis collect France's church bells and melt them down for their metal content, feeling that such a scheme would breed too much resentment against the Nazi occupiers.

Barnaud was arrested in October 1944 on charges of providing the enemy with intelligence. After several delays, the charges were dismissed in 1949. He returned to his business interests and amassed a fortune in post-war France.
