= Bergeret =

Bergeret is a French surname. Notable people with the surname include:

- Claude Bergeret
- Jacques Bergeret (1771–1857), French naval officer and admiral
- Jean Bergeret
- Jean-Louis Bergeret (1641–1694), member of the Académie française
- Jean-Pierre Bergeret (1752–1813), French botanist
- Louis François Étienne Bergeret (1814–1893), French physician
- Pierre-Nolasque Bergeret (1782–1863), French painter and lithographer
- Jean-Marie Bergeret French air force officer

== See also ==
- Claude Njiké-Bergeret
