= Cointet =

Cointet may refer to:

== People with the surname ==
- Guy de Cointet (1934–1983), French artist
- Jean-Paul Cointet, French historian
- Michèle Cointet, French historian

== Other ==
- Cointet-element
