= Henri Giraud =

French military officer (1879–1949)

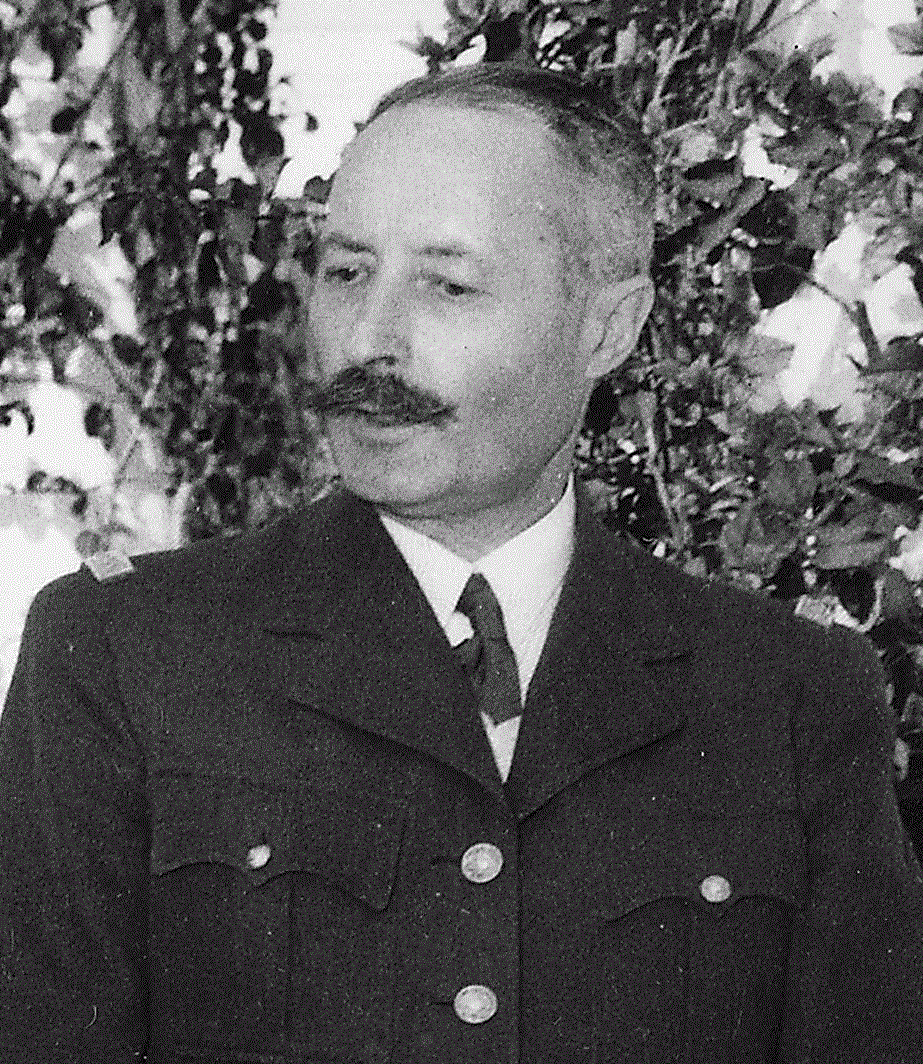
- Giraud in Casablanca, 19 January 1943

Co-chairman of the French Committee of National Liberation (with Charles de Gaulle)
- In office 3 June 1943 – 9 November 1943
- Preceded by: Position created
- Succeeded by: Position abolished

Civil and Military Commander-in-Chief of French North and West Africa
- In office 26 December 1942 – 3 June 1943
- Preceded by: François Darlan
- Succeeded by: Position abolished

Vice-President of the Conseil supérieur de la guerre
- In office ? – 15 December 1948

Member of the Constituent Assembly of 1946 for Moselle
- In office 14 June 1946 – 27 November 1946
- Preceded by: Position created
- Succeeded by: Position abolished

Personal details
- Born: 18 January 1879 Paris, France
- Died: 11 March 1949 (aged 70) Dijon, France
- Party: Republican Party of Liberty
- Spouse: Céline Laperotte (1889–1976; m.1908)
- Children: Renée Granger (1909–1943); Henri Giraud (1910–1970); André Giraud (b.1913); Jeanne Giraud (1918–2007); Marie-Thérèse Giraud (1923–2019); Bernard Giraud; Monique Giraud

Military service
- Allegiance: French Third Republic; Free France; French Fourth Republic
- Branch/service: French Army
- Years of service: 1900–1948
- Rank: Général d'armée
- Battles/wars: First World War; Battle of the Frontiers; Battle of Charleroi; Battle of St. Quentin; Battle of La Malmaison; Rif War; Second World War; Battle of the Netherlands; Battle of France (POW); Tunisian campaign; Liberation of Corsica
- Awards: Legion of Honour (Grand-croix); Médaille militaire Et al.

Henri Honoré Giraud (French: [ɑ̃ʁi ɔnɔʁe ʒiʁo]; 18 January 1879 – 11 March 1949) was a French Army general best known for his escape from German captivity in 1942 and subsequently as one of the leaders of the French Resistance and a rival of Charles de Gaulle. He was outmanoeuvred by de Gaulle and sidelined in April 1944, leading to his resignation.

Giraud also escaped from German captivity during the First World War, having been wounded and captured during the Battle of St. Quentin in 1914. He further distinguished himself at the Battle of La Malmaison in 1917, where he commanded the battalion that captured the Fort de Malmaison, and during the Rif War in 1925. Between 1930 and 1934, Giraud commanded the pacification of tribes in the High Atlas and was appointed military governor of Metz in 1936, during which time de Gaulle was his subordinate.

At the outbreak of the Second World War, Giraud was placed in command of the Seventh Army and, despite his objections, was tasked with executing the ill-fated Breda manoeuvre during the Battle of France in May 1940. He assumed command of the routed Ninth Army in the midst of the battle and was shortly after captured by the Germans. In the winter of 1940–1941, a group of conspirators composed of Giraud's family and staff came together to plan his escape from Königstein Fortress, later involving the Deuxième Bureau.

After Giraud's successful escape to Vichy France in April 1942, he went into hiding and established contact with the Allies. Giraud was selected by the Roosevelt administration as the U.S.-backed candidate for the French leadership and assumed command of French troops in North Africa in November, after the Allied landings. Following the assassination of François Darlan in December, Giraud became High Commissioner for French North and West Africa. His tenure was marked by a slow transition from Vichy authoritarianism to democratisation.

In January 1943, he attended the Casablanca Conference along with Franklin D. Roosevelt, Winston Churchill, and de Gaulle. Giraud delivered a landmark speech in March in which he broke with the Vichy regime and embraced democratic principles. In June, Giraud and de Gaulle established the French Committee of National Liberation as a unified French government of which they became co-presidents. Following his sidelining and resignation, Giraud was the victim of an assassination attempt in August 1944.

After the war, Giraud was elected to the 1946 Constituent Assembly that was to establish the French Fourth Republic. He died in Dijon in 1949.

== Early life and education ==
Henri Honoré Giraud was born in Paris on 18 January 1879 to Louis (d.1916) and Marie Giraud. His father was a veteran of the Franco-Prussian War, having enlisted in the National Guard at the age of 17 during the Siege of Paris. Giraud studied classics at Collège Stanislas, Lycée Louis-le-Grand, and Lycée Bossuet.

== Early military career ==
Giraud graduated from Saint-Cyr in 1900 as a sous-lieutenant and, at his request, was assigned to the 4th Zouaves Regiment in Tunisia. He was promoted to lieutenant in 1902, though despite several recommendations from his direct superiors it would be ten years before he was promoted to the next rank of capitaine. According to Giraud's grandson Henri-Christian Giraud, his career advancement was possibly hindered by the Affaire des Fiches scandal that saw conservative Catholic officers passed up for promotions. In 1907, he was admitted to the War College (ESG) and transferred to the 27th Infantry Regiment in December.

Giraud was appointed to the staff of the 9th Army Corps in 1909 and completed his staff internship in Tours in 1911, after which he was selected by General Louis Fernand Montaudon (in command of a cavalry brigade) (Note: Specifically the 5th and 8th Cuirassier regiments.) in October as his aide-de-camp. In June 1913, Giraud returned to the 4th Zouaves in Tunisia, in command of the 14th company. At the outbreak of the First World War Giraud was on leave in France and returned to his regiment a few days later, in the midst of the mobilisation.

=== First World War ===
Giraud arrived in France with the 4th Zouaves in August 1914 and commanded his company of 250 men in the Battle of Charleroi. Giraud was gravely wounded while leading a bayonet charge during the Battle of St. Quentin on 30 August. Presumed dead, he was discovered by German troops and taken prisoner. While recovering from his lung injury in a military hospital in Origny-Sainte-Benoite, Giraud plotted his escape with fellow wounded prisoner-of-war Captain Charles Schmitt.

On 10 October, a French nurse (Note: Mademoiselle Lemaire was the daughter of the mayor of Origny and a local nurse, having volunteered after an appeal by the German military authorities.) warned Giraud and Schmitt that the Germans were considering evacuating them to Germany and they resolved to escape as soon as possible. The nurse brought them items of clothing which they were able to conceal behind their hospital beds, provided them with a detailed map of the hospital, and had a key made for an unguarded door that led to the Oise Lateral Canal. With their wounds yet to heal, Giraud and Schmitt made their escape on the night of 30 October. They then travelled to German-occupied Saint-Quentin where they remained for two months, Giraud working as a stable boy and Schmitt as a butcher's assistant. In early February 1915, Giraud made the journey to Walcourt in occupied-Belgium from where he continued on to Brussels as an assistant to a travelling show. Once there Giraud encountered Edith Cavell's escape network, which helped him to cross into the neutral Netherlands. He reached Boulogne via Folkestone on 10 February and carried on to Paris, having reunited with Schmitt by chance at the Vlissingen docks.

On 22 February, Giraud was assigned to the staff of the Fifth Army at the request of General Franchet d'Espèrey. In May 1917, he was promoted to the rank of chef de bataillon and assumed command of the 3rd Battalion of the 4th Zouaves in July. As part of the 38th Infantry Division, Giraud's battalion captured the Fort de Malmaison during the Battle of La Malmaison on 23 October and took 600 prisoners. In late 1917, he was appointed chief of staff of the Moroccan Division under General Albert Daugan in the Woëvre sector. Giraud collaborated on counteroffensive operations between the spring and autumn of 1918 and ended the war with five citations.

== Interwar period ==
Giraud was summoned by General d'Espèrey (in command of the Allied troops in the Balkans) to head the Allied operations bureau and served as an expert on Turkish issues at the Paris Peace Conference in 1919. Due to a sequela from his lung injury, Giraud spent two years in a status of temporary inactivity. In 1922, he assumed the position of chief of staff of the military-administrative Subdivision of Marrakesh at the request of Marshal Hubert Lyautey. During the Rif War in the summer of 1925, and in command of the 14th Algerian Tirailleurs Regiment (14e régiment de tirailleurs algériens), Colonel Giraud prevented Riffian forces from closing the strategically important Taza corridor. He was wounded by a bullet to the thigh and awarded commandeur of the Legion of Honour in his Paris hospital bed. Giraud returned to Morocco and escorted Riffian leader Abd el-Krim into exile in 1926.

In October 1927 Giraud was appointed professor of infantry tactics at the ESG, where he taught for three years. In February 1930, Giraud was appointed to a military command in the Morocco-Algeria border region and promoted to brigadier general in December. Over four years, he pacified the tribes of the High Atlas from his headquarters in Boudenib. Giraud assumed command of the Oran Division in 1934 and then the 6th Military Region in April 1936 as military governor of Metz. From 1937, Colonel Charles de Gaulle was under his command in charge of a tank regiment. According to Michèle Cointet, Giraud was interested in the use of tanks but opposed de Gaulle's theories, favouring a more conventional approach whereby tanks would move alongside infantry. In June 1939, Giraud became a member of the Conseil supérieur de la guerre.

== Second World War ==
In September 1939, Giraud was placed in command of the Seventh Army that was initially held in reserve in the Reims region and which contained some of the most mobile divisions in the French Army. In November, General Maurice Gamelin moved the Seventh Army to the far-north, headquartered in Saint-Omer, and tasked Giraud with preparing an intervention in the Netherlands. In March 1940, Gamelin finalised the Breda variant of the Dyle Plan whereby Giraud's Seventh Army was to rapidly advance through Belgium and link up with the Dutch Army. Giraud expressed strong reservations about the Breda manoeuvre, alongside generals Alphonse Joseph Georges and Gaston Billotte, which depleted the central reserve that was intended to cope with unexpected contingencies. Frustrated by the Phoney War, Giraud believed that the French Army should enter Belgium without the Belgians' prior agreement.

=== Battle of France ===
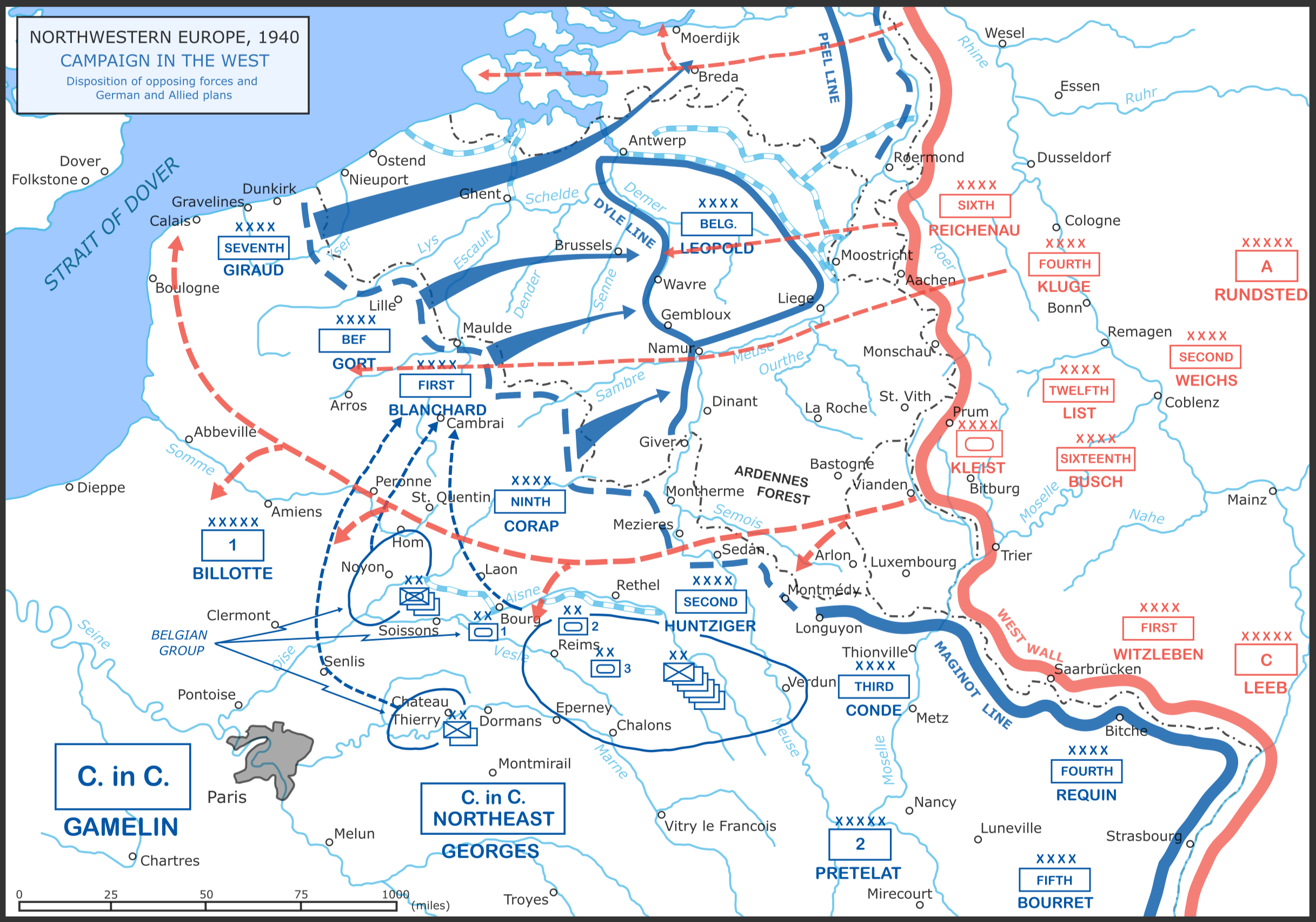
The Breda variant of the Dyle plan and the Manstein plan, as well as the positions of Allied and German forces on the eve of battle

With the commencement of the German offensive on 10 May, Giraud's Seventh Army executed its planned advance, with the first units reaching Breda on 11 May. However, German paratroopers captured the Moerdijk causeway, splitting Holland in two, and Dutch forces withdrew northwards to Amsterdam and Rotterdam. This made it impossible for the Seventh Army to link up with Dutch forces, nullifying the purpose of the Breda manoeuvre, and Giraud was ordered in the afternoon of 12 May to abandon the plan and to redeploy his forces towards Antwerp.

On 15 May, Gamelin ordered General André Corap to be replaced in command of the Ninth Army with Giraud, who assumed command that afternoon. By this point, the Ninth Army was in a catastrophic state of total disintegration, though this was partly concealed by the chaotic state of communications. Giraud established his command post close to his frontline troops and, having been ordered on 18 May to fall behind Le Catelet, he advanced in a reconnaissance armoured car. He was surrounded by the Germans and taken prisoner at Wassigny on 19 May, with his final message to general headquarters reading: "Surrounded by a hundred enemy tanks, I destroy them in detail."

=== Captivity and escape ===
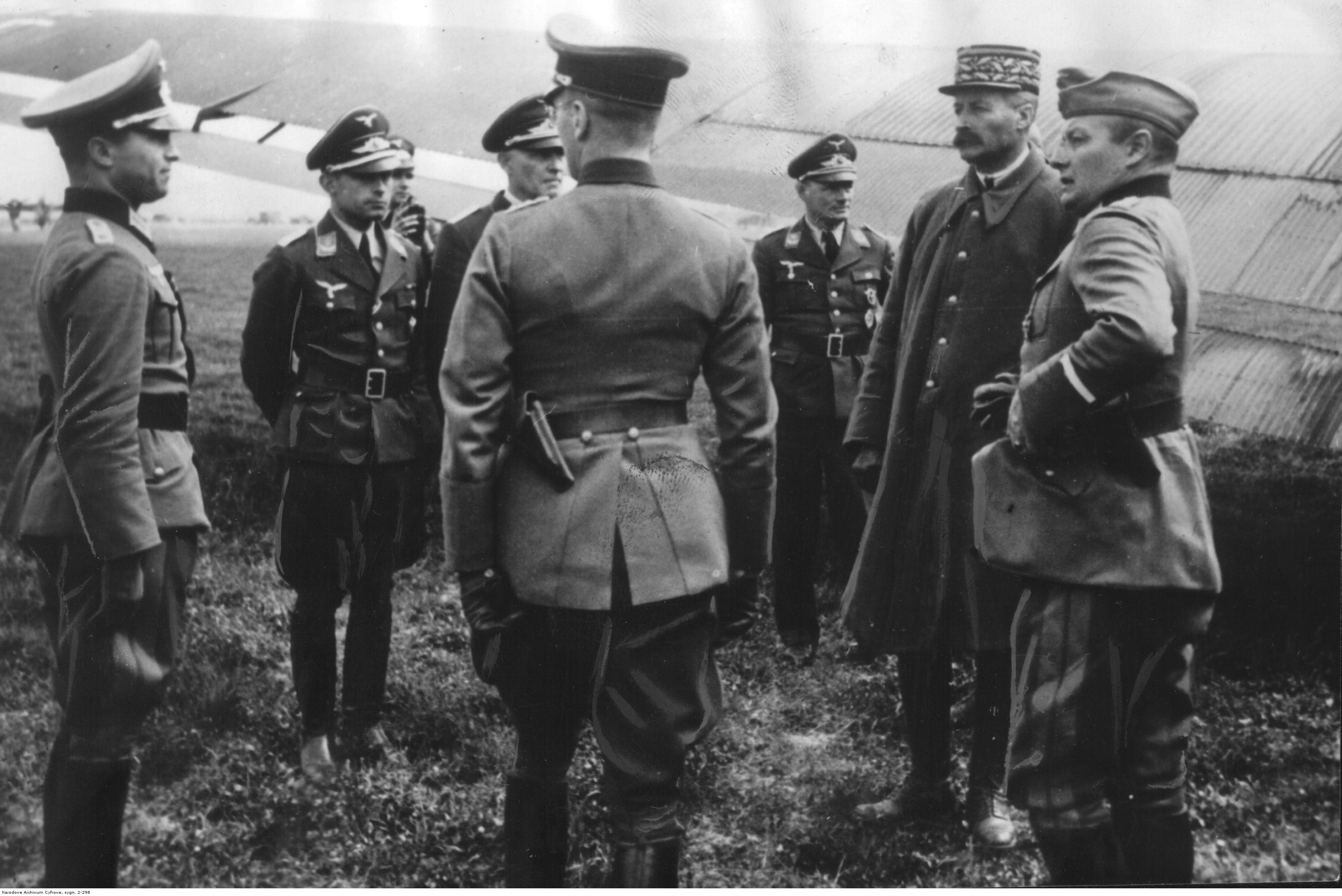
Giraud (second from the right) with German officers, May 1940

Giraud was taken to Königstein Fortress in eastern Germany on 25 May, where he was the most important of the approximately one hundred French and foreign generals and admirals held there. In July, he sent Marshal Philippe Pétain a letter on the causes of the defeat in which he denounced, among other things, the declining birth rate, paid holidays, parliamentarianism, trade unions, the state of public education, and a dilution of the notion of authority. The commandant of the fortress allowed the prisoners to go on supervised tourist excursions, though prisoners signed a register upon leaving and Giraud claimed postwar that he felt bound by honour not to use these daytime walks to escape.

A code based on handwriting anomalies was smuggled out of the fortress in October in the tunic of General Paul-Wilhelm Boell, who had been released for health reasons, and given to Giraud's daughter shortly before he died. Alongside the code was a letter from Giraud dated to September and addressed to his children that was subsequently circulated widely in France: (Note: De Gaulle, now in exile, sent a copy of Giraud's letter to Prince Felix of Bourbon-Parma, evidenced by Prince Felix's reply in March 1942.)

My dear children,

I don't know how long I will stay here, months, years, perhaps. It is possible that I will be buried next to my friend, Dame. I am ready for anything: it doesn't matter.
I entrust you with the task of replacing me in a sacred duty, the rebuilding of France.
I forbid you to resign yourselves to defeat, and to admit that France could come after Italy, Spain, or Finland. The means are irrelevant. The goal alone is essential. Everything must be subordinate to it. You will sacrifice your personal interests, your tastes, your theories.
At first, it is not a question of confronting head-on an enemy who has secured possession of our land and completely disarmed us. Stresemann defined the method to be employed: we simply have to copy intelligently.
First priority: the liberation of the territory within the borders left to us. Then, physical, moral, and social reconstruction.
a) Have children. Help those who have them;
b) Raise them as they should be raised, for France;
c) Ensure every family has a place in the sun.
...
Nothing resembles "field service" like the training of scouts. Nothing resembles a military aircraft quite like a transport plane. A tracked tractor only needs its armour plating to become a tank, etc., etc.
But above all, let minds be equal to the task. Let them want to be fully French. Let no one emigrate from occupied or temporarily detached territories: the aim is to maintain French thought there. But let no one hesitate to emigrate if offered a position abroad where they can be useful to France.
All of you, Pierre, Henri, André, Bernard, and you, my dear daughters, remember that a storm passes, but the Fatherland remains.
A nation lives when it chooses to live. Repeat this to those around you. Force others to think like you, to work like you. We are sure of success, if we know how to will it.

Resolution. Patience. Decisiveness.

— General H. Giraud

==== Planning ====
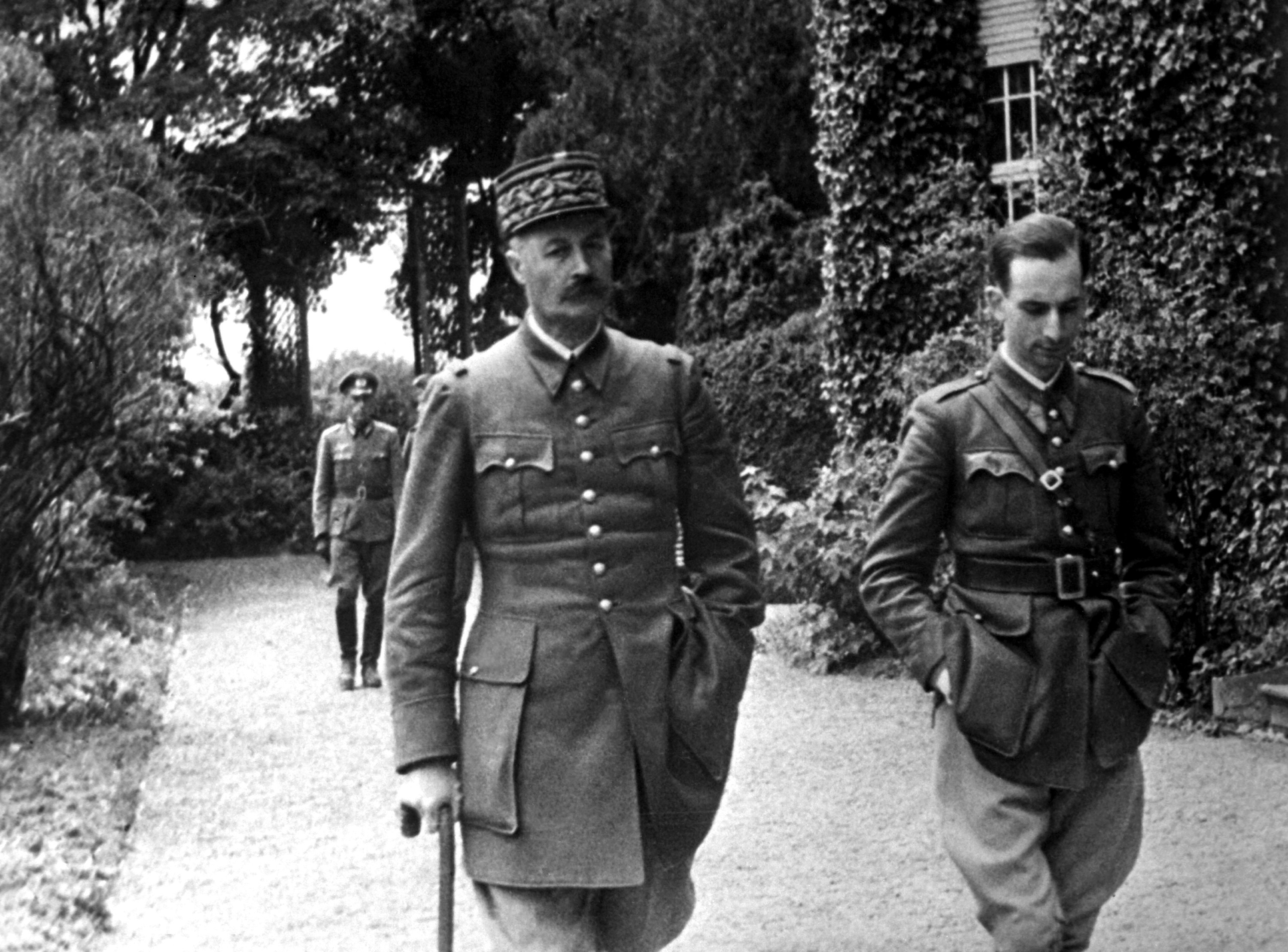
Giraud during one of his daily walks in captivity

In the winter of 1940–1941 a group of conspirators came together to plan Giraud's escape, based in Lyon and composed of General Henri Baurès (Giraud's former chief of staff), Commandant Marcel Granger (Giraud's son-in-law), as well as Giraud's wife and children. An initial escape plan devised by Giraud, codenamed "Francine", was smuggled out of Königstein in mid-December in the lining of General Marie-Jean-Georges Goudouneix's kepi, who was also released for health reasons. The plan was deemed impossible but from it another was derived, codenamed "Denise", that envisioned Giraud escaping on his own accord and required the conspirators to send a guide to Königstein in possession of false papers and funds. The guide was to meet Giraud on an agreed upon date outside Königstein and take him first to Berlin and then on the Strasbourg night express where a network would be waiting to secure his passage out of the German occupation zone.

General Charles Mast was released in September 1941 at the request of Pétain and the Japanese military attaché in Vichy, leaving Giraud his Tyrolean hat and maps that he had obtained for his own aborted escape. Mast was a close confidant of Giraud and contributed invaluable information to the escape plan, which was finalised that autumn. Baurès subsequently brought head of the Lyon Deuxième Bureau General François de Linarès into the loop, who collaborated with the 3rd Bureau (operations) in Vichy to procure the necessary false documents and the tin cans to be used to smuggle them, as well as the locations of safe houses, smugglers, and escape routes.

A detailed plan was drawn up on onion skin paper in December whereafter it was rolled up into a pencil tube and concealed in a cake sent by Giraud's wife Céline later that month. Giraud responded on 15 January 1942, agreeing to the plan. Giraud and General Gustave Mesny had spent the past year braiding a 45 m (148 ft) rope from twine that they obtained from parcel wrapping, but required a metallic wire to reinforce it. Sections of reinforced metal cable were sent in cans of grease with the help of a friendly French company and Giraud was able to distract the attendant, who was supposed to check the contents, with cigarettes. The cable was intertwined with the rope and a wooden bar was looped around the end to act as a seat. Giraud received a message on 1 April that read "Denise will make her First Communion on April 17th at 10:00 a.m.", setting the time and date for the escape, though the conspirators had yet to secure a guide. Céline and de Linarès contacted Hélène Studler, a religious sister in the French Resistance, who recruited Roger Guerlach, a Reichswehr draft dodger from Moselle.

==== The escape ====
With several generals keeping watch and generals Mesny and Paulin-André-Jean Le Bleu letting down the rope, the 63-year-old Giraud rappelled down the sheer rock face adjacent to the fortress. (Note: The other accomplices were generals Jean-Baptiste Molinié, Louis-Germain Girol, Georges-Henri-Jean-Baptiste Misserey, Jean-Adolphe-Louis-Robert Flavigny, Emile-Louis-Gabriel Brown de Colstoun, Émile-Henri Gailliard, René Lévy, Jean-Georges-Henri Masson-Bachasson de Montalivet, and Norwegian general Otto Ruge.) Once at the bottom, he shaved his moustache and put on glasses to match his identity documents and changed into hiking attire, donning his Tyrolean hat. He left a note in his cell for the commander of the fortress where he presented as a depressed man contemplating suicide and asked the general to inform his wife gently. Giraud then walked to Bad Schandau station where he encountered Guerlach and the two exchanged a codephrase. However, rather than wait five hours for the train to Berlin, Giraud switched the tickets to Munich. He changed into the civilian clothes brought by Guerlach and the two continued on their journey, avoiding long waits.

On 19 April, Giraud lost sight of Guerlach on the train from Strasbourg to Mulhouse where their contact was waiting for them and, assuming that Guerlach had missed the train, got off at Sélestat to wait for the next one. While he was waiting, he attended a football match in honour of Hitler's birthday. Giraud then carried on to Mulhouse where he spent the night in a hotel and found Guerlach and their contact the following morning. The delay now meant that the original plan to exfiltrate Giraud wasn't feasible and a new route was improvised through Switzerland. In the meantime, posters of Giraud had been put up throughout the occupation zone and a 100,000 Reichsmark reward was offered for information leading to his arrest. With Deuxième Bureau contact Father Joseph Stamm (Note: Stamm would later be arrested for resistance activity in September 1943 and executed on 17 April 1945.) as his guide, Giraud crossed the Swiss border on 22 April. Giraud contacted General Roger Masson, who he had taught at the ESG. He subsequently travelled by car to Sainte-Foy-lès-Lyon, in the zone libre, where he was reunited with his family on 25 April, being diverted by the Deuxième Bureau away from the Annemasse border crossing where the Germans were waiting for him.

==== Aftermath ====
For the French, Giraud's escape was the only joyful news of the time and de Gaulle praised his feat, with the two generals coming to embody the hope of victory. On 25 April, Hitler had ordered that everything be done to arrest Giraud in Germany and German Foreign Minister Joachim von Ribbentrop amplified his remarks to the German ambassador to Vichy Otto Abetz, telling him of Hitler's "fury".

Giraud met with Pétain at the Hôtel du Parc in Vichy on 29 April where he presented figures and technical details to prove that Germany would not win the war, though Pétain remained impassive and responded with platitudes. Pétain then ordered Giraud to repeat the presentation to Prime Minister Pierre Laval, who rejected his conclusions and asserted his belief in a German victory. Under pressure from Abetz, Laval attempted to convince Giraud to voluntarily return to Germany but he refused. They met again on 30 April where Laval informed Giraud that the Germans intended to halt all prisoner repatriations unless he returned, to which Giraud agreed on the condition that all married prisoners be released. Guaranteed safe passage, Giraud met Abetz in Moulins on 2 May to negotiate his return. Abetz rejected Giraud's condition, claiming it would mean the release of 600,000 men, and the meeting ended acrimoniously, with the intelligence service of the Armistice Army protecting Giraud's return journey.

General René Chambe took charge of Giraud's security and, visited by Pétain's chief of staff on 4 May, Giraud agreed to pledge loyalty to Pétain and remain quiet on the basis that he would be left in peace. Chambe moved Giraud to a relative's property in La Verpillière, the gates to which were blocked by police cars on 25 May. However, Chambe had prepared a hidden exit through the perimeter fence and they escaped to Saint-Didier-au-Mont-d'Or.

Several months after Giraud's escape, Hitler transferred the Giraud assignment from Abwehr chief Wilhelm Canaris, who allegedly evaded a request from Generalfeldmarschall Wilhelm Keitel to assassinate him, to Reichsführer-SS Heinrich Himmler. Hitler ordered Himmler to arrest any members of Giraud's family that were within reach in order to hold them as hostages, with the aim of undermining his allegiance to the Allied cause. Following the German and Italian invasion of the zone libre, Giraud's family was confined to Vals-les-Bains in December and then to Saint-Romain-de-Lerps. In October 1943, his wife, daughters Jeanne and Marie-Thérèse, and three grandchildren were arrested and taken to Germany. Only his elderly mother-in-law and 16-year-old daughter Monique remained free, with Monique later reaching Algiers via Spain. Giraud's eldest daughter Renée, who had been captured in Tunisia alongside her four children, died en route to Germany on 24 September 1943.

=== Cooperation with the Allies ===
Assisted by a small staff composed of his allies, Giraud prepared an operation plan for an Allied landing on the French Mediterranean coast, between Toulon and Port-Vendres, that would reinforce the Armistice Army, with a second landing taking place in the north. Giraud made contact with the commanders of the French army in June 1942, taking for granted their agreement, and sent Chambe to meet General Maxime Weygand on three occasions at his villa near Cannes, though Weygand categorically refused to take command of the army against Germany at a meeting on 14 August.

In the spring of 1942, Giraud appointed Mast, who was stationed in Algeria, his delegate in North Africa. The Americans established contact with Giraud in June, having been informed of his availability by Sister Hélène and through the American Red Cross. The Roosevelt administration was searching for a high-ranking French officer who could facilitate the Allied occupation of North Africa and Giraud emerged as the only pro-Ally officer of sufficient rank and prestige. De Gaulle was not seriously considered due to his divisiveness among the Vichy officer corps and the failure of the Free French at Dakar. Having met with American diplomat Robert Murphy, Mast attempted to persuade Giraud in October to prioritise North Africa. Mast was subsequently entrusted by Murphy with the information that an American intervention was imminent. On 24 October, an American mission led by General Mark W. Clark clandestinely met with French officers, led by Mast, near Cherchell to negotiate Giraud's support. Clark rejected Giraud's wish for a landing in Provence, though agreed to his demand that only American troops be used (Note: According to Michèle Cointet, this was likely either an improvised concession or a white lie.) and that, in the process of equipping French forces, they could come under French command. The version of the agreements recorded by the French side and sent to Giraud was sent off without Murphy's approval and stated that, after the landings, operations were to be placed under French command.

On learning from Mast that Operation Torch was imminently planned for the night of 7–8 November, Jacques Lemaigre-Dubreuil (Giraud's intermediary with the Americans) secured from Murphy further concessions and a firm promise that command could be finalised during the equipping of French forces so that the French would assume supreme command at the appropriate time. Giraud was informed of the date of the landings on 1 November, with him needing to leave on 4 November, and met with Lemaigre-Dubreuil, who presented him with Murphy's promises. Giraud initially refused to go to Algiers but eventually agreed on the condition that they take a detour to Gibraltar to meet with General Dwight D. Eisenhower, where he intended to seek Eisenhower's position of Supreme Commander of the Allied Expeditionary Force in the Mediterranean theatre. Worried about his family who couldn't be evacuated in time, Giraud's wife urged him to go. The detour meant that Giraud wouldn't arrive in time to appeal to the Armistice Army of Africa and he consequently wrote an appeal that was to be broadcast on Algiers radio. Giraud also drafted a general order to the regional commanders in metropolitan France to delay a German invasion of North Africa and de Linarès attempted to rally them to the delaying action and to persuade friendly generals to follow him to Algiers.

Aided by the Alliance network, (Note: Led by Georges Loustaunau-Lacau and Marie-Madeleine Fourcade, with Maurice MacMahon, Duke of Magenta, acting as the intermediary with Giraud.) Giraud boarded the British submarine HMS Seraph near Le Lavandou on the night of 5 November with his son Bernard and Captain André Beaufre. Giraud had requested by radio that the submarine be "Not English" and it was therefore presented to him with an American captain, while the British captain and crew remained silent in the background. On 7 November, they rendezvoused with a seaplane that took them to Gibraltar. Giraud and Beaufre reached Eisenhower's underground command post at 5:00 p.m., however Eisenhower was unaware of Giraud's apprehension and tried in vain to explain to him that only an American was suitable to command the operation. Giraud felt that his honour would be tarnished as Eisenhower's deputy and declared that he would only be a spectator in the affair, with the meeting concluding without agreement after seven hours of argument. They met again the following morning where Eisenhower presented a compromise: the Allied and French commanders would be on an equal footing, each commanding their own troops, while the commander with the most troops would command any joint operations. Eisenhower also promised Giraud that, were he able to obtain French support, he would make him the head of the civilian government in liberated territory and French forces. Giraud accepted, though he was delayed from leaving for Algiers until 9 November.

==== Arrival in Africa ====
Giraud's appeal was broadcast on the morning of 8 November, however it was ignored by the officer corps of the Armistice Army of Africa, which was committed to legal authority and had sworn an oath of loyalty to Pétain in October 1941. Giraud landed at Blida Airport on 9 November in civilian clothes and to no welcome party, only being greeted by the airbase commander, who refused to recognise his authority. He also learned of Admiral François Darlan's signing of a localised ceasefire in Algiers the previous day, continuing on to Lemaigre-Dubreuil's residence where he was reproached by his supporters Lemaigre-Dubreuil and Henri d'Astier for his delayed arrival. Judging that Giraud would not be supported by the governors-general and that Darlan was the only candidate who could claim a vague mandate from Vichy, Clark and Murphy signed a ceasefire with Darlan for the whole of North Africa on 10 November.

Clark and Murphy met with Giraud on 11 November to offer him civil and military command over French North Africa as well as the position he had sought in Gibraltar, though to the surprise of his contemporaries he declined, responding "I am not a statesman, I know nothing about civil government; I only want the supreme command of the land and sea troops." The Americans subsequently invited Giraud to negotiations on the French military command structure with General Alphonse Juin, Darlan (who was in the meantime entrusted by the Americans with the civil command), and General Charles Noguès that ran from 12–13 November. Vichyists Darlan and Noguès initially rejected Giraud as a "rebel general", though they came to an agreement after being threatened with arrest.

Darlan delayed the announcement of Giraud as commander-in-chief of the armed forces in Africa and persuaded him to relinquish control of the navy. Giraud subsequently assumed the position of commander-in-chief of the land and air forces in Africa on 14 November under the authority of Darlan who became High Commissioner for French North and West Africa and commander-in-chief of the armed forces in Africa, though Giraud's command would take precedence in the event of combined operations. Giraud issued a secret memo on 15 November maintaining the Vichy-era internment of North African Jewish conscripts in the form of work units (such as in the Bedeau camp), writing in a November circular:

I recommend not assigning Israelites to combat formations because if they behaved heroically, we would be obliged to recognise it, to grant them ranks and decorations, and to admit that the children of those killed [facing] the enemy would attain the status of pupilles de la nation

=== High Commissioner for French North and West Africa ===
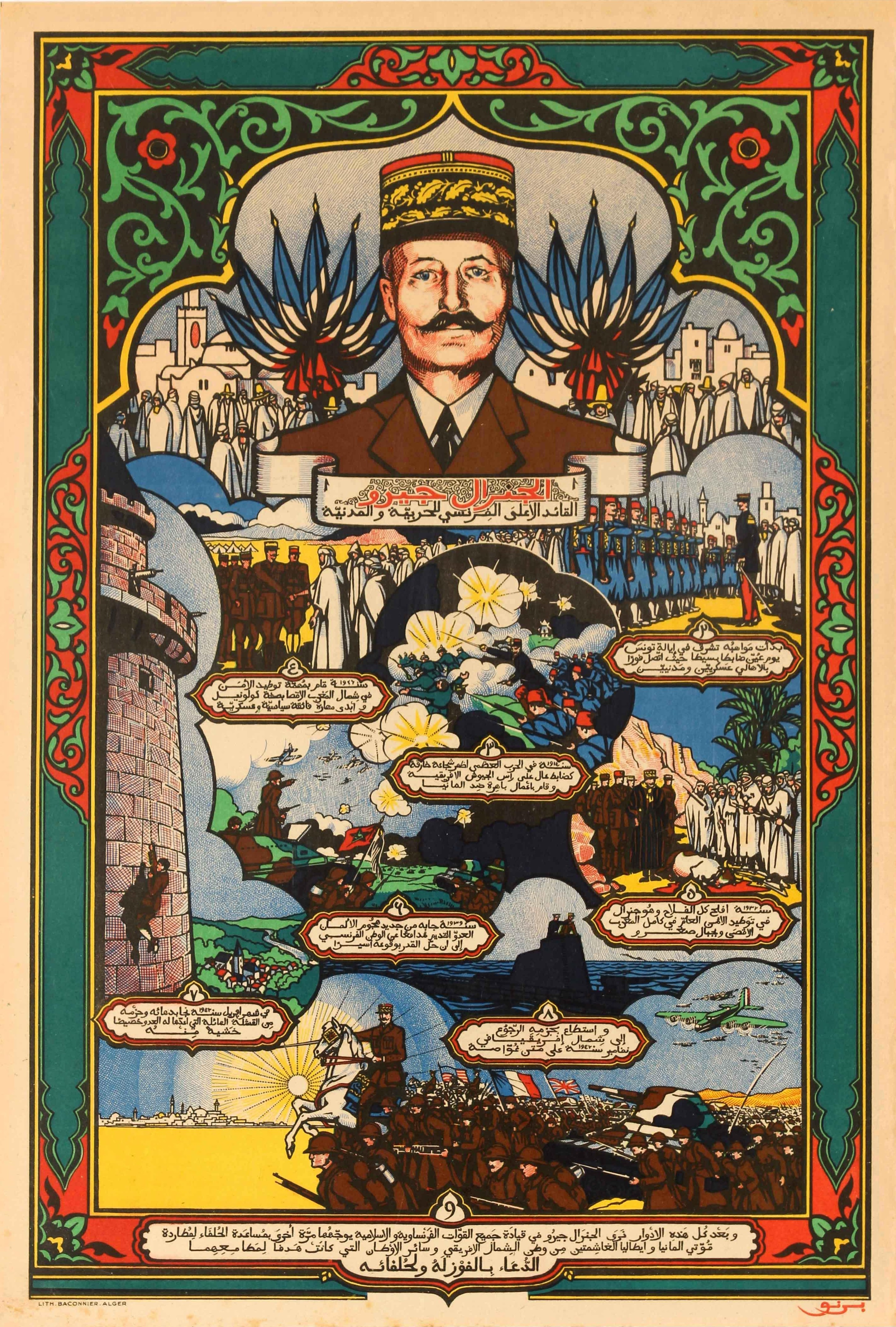
Propaganda poster depicting Giraud as civil and military commander-in-chief

On 24 December, Darlan was shot dead in Algiers by Fernand Bonnier de La Chapelle, a 20-year-old member of the local resistance that had helped to facilitate the Allied landings. Giraud, rushing back to Algiers from Tunisia, and General Jean-Marie Bergeret expedited the subsequent court-martial to maintain public order and Bonnier was executed on 26 December. Noguès initially assumed Darlan's positions while a successor was selected and Giraud was appointed in his place at the request of Eisenhower on 26 December.

Giraud governed according to giraudisme, a state of mind rather than a rigorous doctrine that sought to synthesise a vigorously anti-German position with continued allegiance to the values of the Révolution nationale. Giraud retained Vichy-era legislation and continued governing under the pretext that Pétain was prevented from ruling. On 30 December, and at the request of Bergeret and his supporter Jean Rigault, Giraud ordered the internment of twelve Gaullist resistance members in the police that had aided the Allied landings, alleging that there was a plot to assassinate him and Murphy. He also maintained Darlan's appointments and followed through with the appointment of Vichy politician Marcel Peyrouton as Governor-General of Algeria.

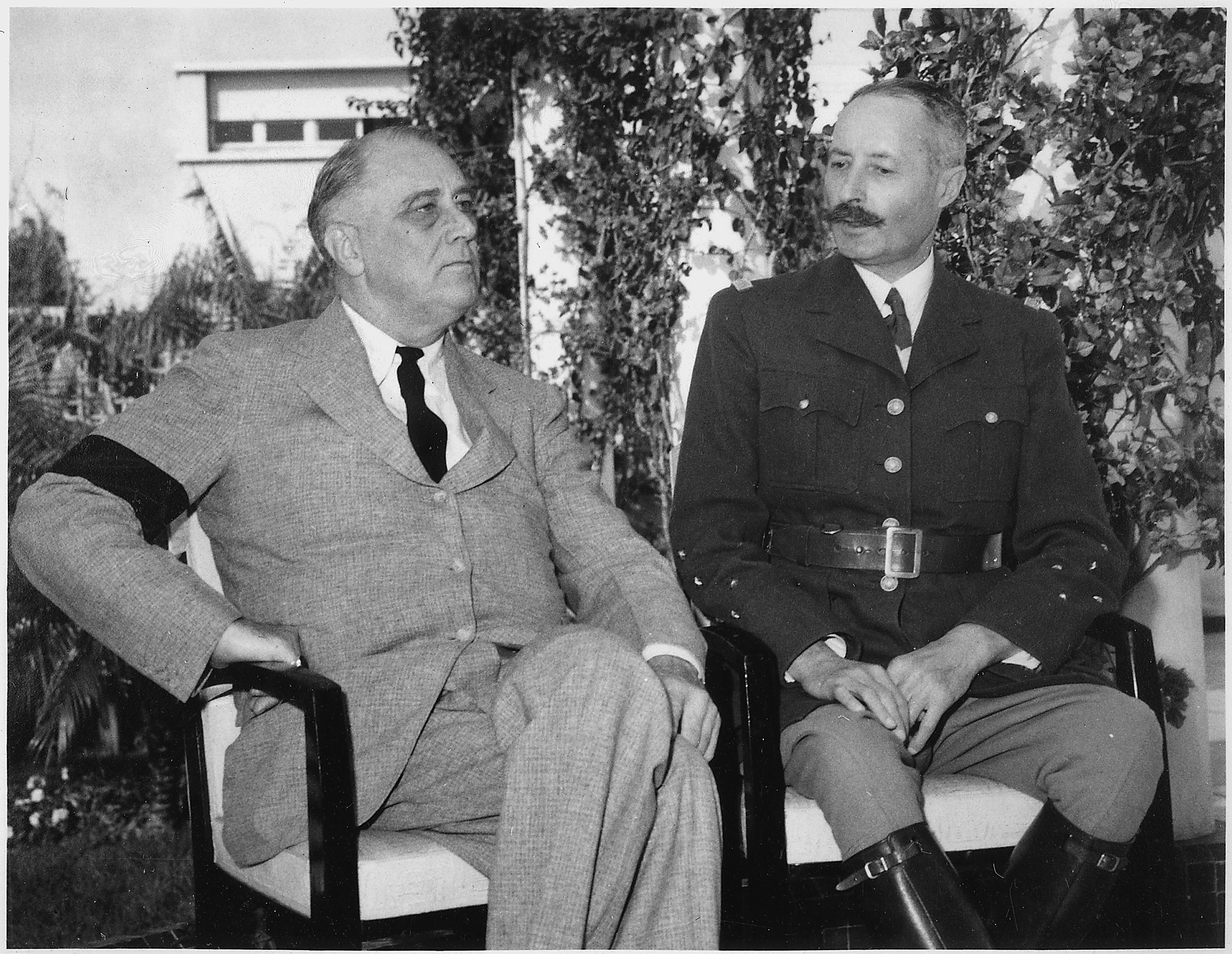
Roosevelt and Giraud in Casablanca on 19 January

Invited by Eisenhower, Giraud arrived at the Casablanca Conference on 17 January 1943 where he secured President Roosevelt's formal support for the leadership and a commitment to equip 250,000 French soldiers. De Gaulle arrived on 22 January and the two met the following morning to discuss the unification of the Fighting French movement and the future of the Vichy regime, Giraud presenting the Murphy-Macmillan plan for a duumvirate in which de Gaulle would look after political affairs and de Gaulle vying for political leadership whereby Giraud would be subordinated to him and in charge of the military. The talks resulted in no agreement, though to feign progress Giraud and de Gaulle agreed to sign a brief communique at a staged press conference on 24 January where they would shake hands for the newsreels.

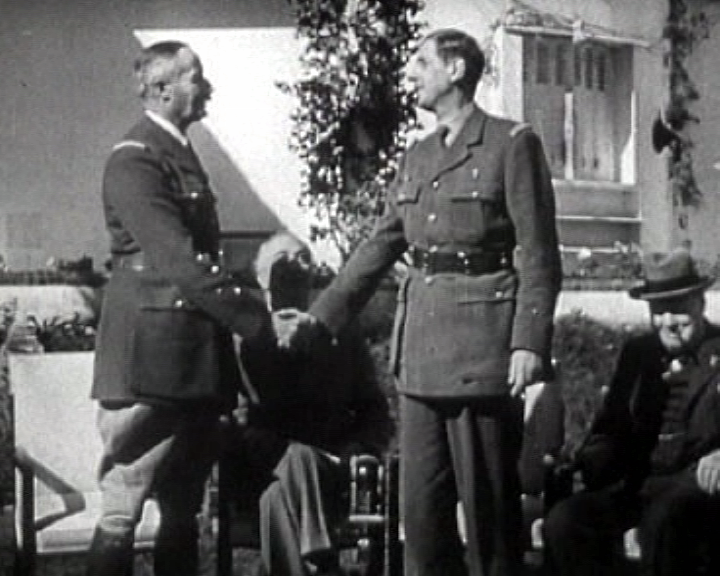
Giraud and de Gaulle on 24 January. Seated: Roosevelt and Churchill.

On 29 January, Giraud promised to revoke Vichy-era legislation and on 30 January he confirmed his intention to accelerate the release of political detainees, which included several hundred Spanish republicans and smaller contingents of Gaullists and French Communist Party deputies. An American press campaign in early 1943 denounced the internment camps and the retention of Vichy anti-Jewish legislation, with Giraud releasing the twelve Gaullists and 27 interned Communists in early February as well as announcing improved living conditions for detainees.

Following the advice of Roosevelt envoy Jean Monnet, Giraud gave a speech on 14 March in which he broke with the Vichy regime, embraced democratic principles, and declared the Vichy-era decrees to no longer be in effect, leading to the resignation of members of his entourage, including Bergeret and Rigault. However he refused to reinstate the Crémieux Decree, the revoking of which had removed French citizenship from Algerian Jews. In his memoirs, Giraud defended himself against accusations of antisemitism and asserted that the Crémieux Decree was discriminatory towards Algerian Muslims. On 28 April Giraud officially ordered the closure of the Algerian internment camps. On 10 May, Roosevelt telegraphed Giraud to congratulate him on the "brilliant contribution" of the French forces under his command to the victorious Tunisian campaign.

=== French Committee of National Liberation ===
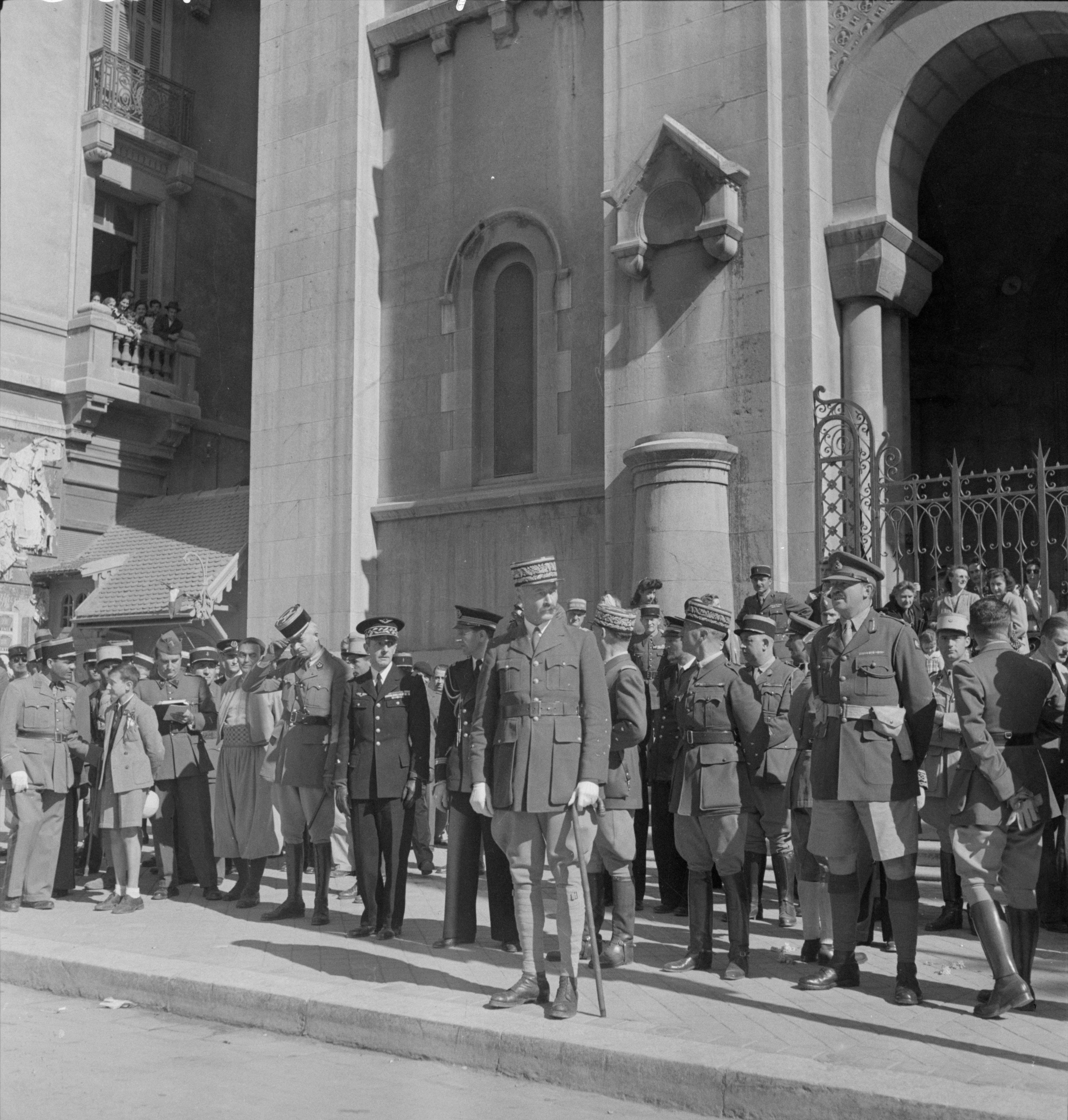
Giraud reviewing French troops as they enter Tunis in May

Giraud and de Gaulle met in Algiers on 30 May for negotiations on forming a central French government. De Gaulle won control of the political situation and secured Peyrouton's resignation on 1 June which Peyrouton submitted to de Gaulle, promising to delay its delivery to Giraud. On 3 June, de Gaulle and Giraud agreed to establish the French Committee of National Liberation (CFLN) which they would head as co-presidents.

Giraud decided to suspend all promotions and awards until the liberation of France, allowing de Gaulle to reward the heroes of the Tunisian campaign. Giraud declared that he had no interest in political affairs and sought to devote himself solely to military matters from which de Gaulle would be excluded, with the crisis erupting at a 27 July meeting of the CFLN. On 31 July, it was decided that Giraud would preside over the CFLN when defence matters were discussed while de Gaulle would handle general policy.

The Army of Africa was subsequently merged with the Free French Forces and Giraud was appointed commander-in-chief of all French armed forces, though the CFLN retained the ultimate authority over the direction of the war and the armed forces. In September, Giraud made the decision to intervene in the Communist resistance uprising in Corsica and secured Eisenhower's support without informing the CFLN, for which he was reproached by de Gaulle. He flew into Ajaccio on the night of 20–21 September and de Gaulle used his preoccupation with operations in Corsica to push for Giraud's exclusion from the CFLN leadership. On 9 November de Gaulle signed a decree that removed Giraud and General Alphonse Joseph Georges from the CFLN, citing a unanimous decision arrived at on 6 November to separate military command from political power which he was tasked with carrying out.

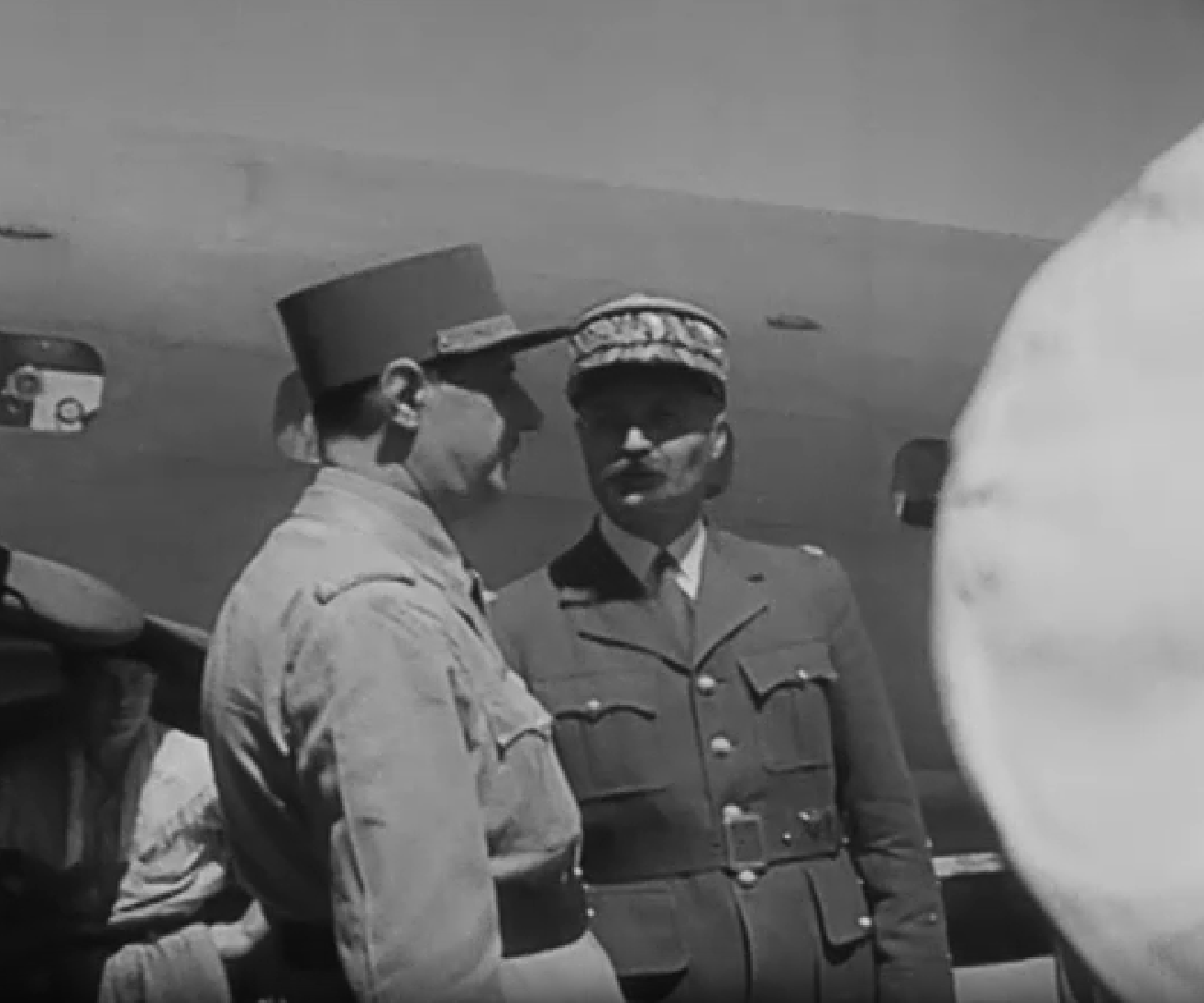
Giraud greeting de Gaulle at Boufarik Airport on 30 May

Giraud's reputation suffered a crippling blow in March 1944 when Pierre Pucheu, who he had invited to Algiers in February 1943 and promised a place in the army, was tried and executed for treason. The military high command was reorganised on 4 April 1944 to make the president of the CFLN the commander-in-chief of the armed forces and, on 9 April, de Gaulle published a decree appointing Giraud to the position of inspector general where he would take on an advisory role. Having lost American support, Giraud accepted the decision and announced his retirement on 15 April.

On 28 August, Giraud survived an assassination attempt at his Mazagran villa by Bouali Miloud, one of his Senegalese guards. Walking in the garden with his daughter-in-law, the bullet struck Giraud under the jaw and passed through his cheek as he leant towards his restless infant grandson who was being pushed in a pram. Roosevelt personally intervened with de Gaulle in September to ensure that Giraud's security was improved. The French authorities decided that the Muslim Miloud had acted under the influence of alcohol or in a fit of madness and he was sentenced to death by a military tribunal on 14 December. Giraud pleaded for clemency, though this was rejected by de Gaulle. Giraud returned to France in October and was successful in getting his family to Switzerland in 1945.

== Post war ==
In June 1946, Giraud was elected to the 1946 Constituent Assembly as a representative of the Republican Party of Liberty for Moselle and spoke regularly on the debate surrounding the new constitution, advocating for greater powers for the executive branch in matters of national defence. He ultimately voted against the constitution of the Fourth Republic and did not run again in the National Assembly elections in November. Until December 1948, he served as Vice-President of the Conseil supérieur de la guerre. Giraud published two books, Mes évasions (My Escapes) in 1946 and Un seul but, la victoire: Alger 1942–1944 (A Single Goal, Victory: Algiers 1942–1944) in 1949 about his experiences.

Giraud fell ill in 1948 and died in a Dijon military hospital on 11 March 1949, at the age of 70. On 10 March, the day before his death, Giraud was awarded the Médaille militaire for his 1942 escape from German captivity. A state funeral (obsèques nationales) was held on 14–17 March and his remains were interred in the vault at the Cathedral of Saint-Louis-des-Invalides in Paris.

== Selected works ==
- Giraud, Henri (1946). Mes évasions [My Escapes] (in French). Paris: R. Julliard. Full text online.
- Giraud, Henri (1949). Un seul but, la victoire: Alger 1942–1944 [A Single Goal, Victory: Algiers 1942–1944] (in French). Paris: R. Julliard.

== Decorations and honours ==
(French Third Republic) France:

- Grand Cross of the Legion of Honour – 20 February 1941
  - Grand Officer – 16 March 1932
  - Commander – 18 August 1925
  - Officer – 6 July 1919
  - Knight – 10 April 1915
- Médaille militaire – 10 March 1949
- Croix de guerre 1914–1918 (three palms and two stars)
- Croix de guerre 1939–1945 (two palms)
- Croix de guerre des théâtres d'opérations extérieures (two palms)
- Escapees' Medal – 12 October 1927
- Colonial Medal (MOROCCO clasp)
- Academic Officer (Silver Palms) – July 1929
- 1914–1918 Inter-Allied Victory medal
- 1914–1918 Commemorative War Medal

Morocco:

- Grand Cross of the Order of Ouissam Alaouite

Tunisia:

- Commander of the Order of Nichan Iftikhar

Belgium:

- Croix de guerre
- Grand Cross of the Order of the Crown

== See also ==
- Liberation of France
- Operation Kingpin (World War II)

== Bibliography ==
- Bel-Ange, Norbert (2006). Quand Vichy internait ses soldats juifs d'Algérie: Bedeau, sud oranais, 1941–1943 [When Vichy Interned its Jewish Soldiers from Algeria: Bedeau, Southern Oran, 1941–1943] (in French). Paris: L'Harmattan. ISBN 978-229-642-363-3.
- Cantier, Jacques (2002). L'Algérie sous le régime de Vichy [Algeria Under the Vichy Regime] (in French). Paris: Éditions Odile Jacob. ISBN 978-273-811-057-2.
- Chambe, René (15 April 1962). "Comment fur préparée l'évasion de Giraud" [How Giraud's escape was prepared]. Revue des Deux Mondes (in French): 503–526. JSTOR 44590610.
- Cointet, Michèle (2005). De Gaulle et Giraud: L'affrontement, 1942–1944 [De Gaulle and Giraud: The Confrontation, 1942–1944] (in French). Paris: Perrin. ISBN 978-228-601-260-1.
- De Gabiola, Javier Garcia (2023). The Rif War. Volume 2: From Xauén to the Alhucemas Landing and Beyond 1922–1927. Warwick: Helion and Company. ISBN 978-180-451-416-0.
- Funk, Arthur L. (1971). "Eisenhower, Giraud, and the Command of "TORCH"". Military Affairs. 35 (3): 103–108. doi:10.2307/1983994. JSTOR 1983994.
- Giraud, Henri-Christian (2014). 1914–1918: La Grande Guerre du général Giraud [1914–1918: The Great War of General Giraud] (in French). Paris: Éditions du Rocher. ISBN 978-226-808-308-7.
- Harding, Stephen (2013). The Last Battle: When U.S. and German Soldiers Joined Forces in the Waning Hours of World War II in Europe. Philadelphia: Da Capo Press. ISBN 978-0-306-82209-4.
- Jackson, Julian (2004). The Fall of France: The Nazi Invasion of 1940. Oxford University Press. ISBN 978-019-280-550-8.
- Lévisse-Touzé, Christine (1993). "Le général Giraud et l'Afrique du Nord (1942 — juin 1943)" [General Giraud and North Africa (1942 — June 1943)]. Revue Historique des Armées (in French). 191 (2): 13–22. doi:10.3406/rharm.1993.4242.
- Paxton, Robert O. (1966). Parade and Politics at Vichy: The French Officer Corps Under Marshal Pétain. Princeton, NJ: Princeton University Press. ISBN 978-069-105-142-0.
- Porch, Douglas (2024). Resistance and Liberation: France at War, 1942–1945. Cambridge University Press. ISBN 978-100-916-114-5.
- Schiavon, Max (2021). Gamelin: la tragédie de l'ambition [Gamelin: The Tragedy of Ambition] (in French). Paris: Perrin. ISBN 978-226-208-001-3.
- Thomas, Martin (1996). "The Discarded Leader: General Henri Giraud and the Foundation of the French Committee of National Liberation". French History. 10 (1): 86–111. doi:10.1093/fh/10.1.86.
