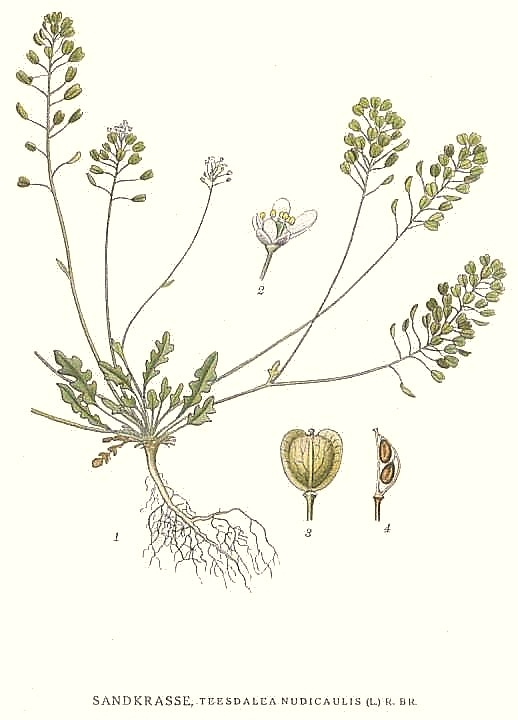
- Teesdalia nudicaulis

Scientific classification
- Kingdom: Plantae
- Clade: Tracheophytes
- Clade: Angiosperms
- Clade: Eudicots
- Clade: Rosids
- Order: Brassicales
- Family: Brassicaceae
- Genus: Teesdalia; W.T.Aiton

Synonyms
- Folis Dulac; Guepinia T.Bastard; Teesdaliopsis (Willk.) Gand.

= Teesdalia =

Genus of flowering plants

Teesdalia is a genus in the plant family Brassicaceae. They are herbaceous plants native mostly to Europe and to the Mediterranean region. Shepherdscress is a common name for these plants.

== Species ==
Three species are accepted.

- Teesdalia conferta (Lag.) O.Appel
- Teesdalia coronopifolia (J.P.Bergeret) Thell.
- Teesdalia nudicaulis (L.) W.T.Aiton
