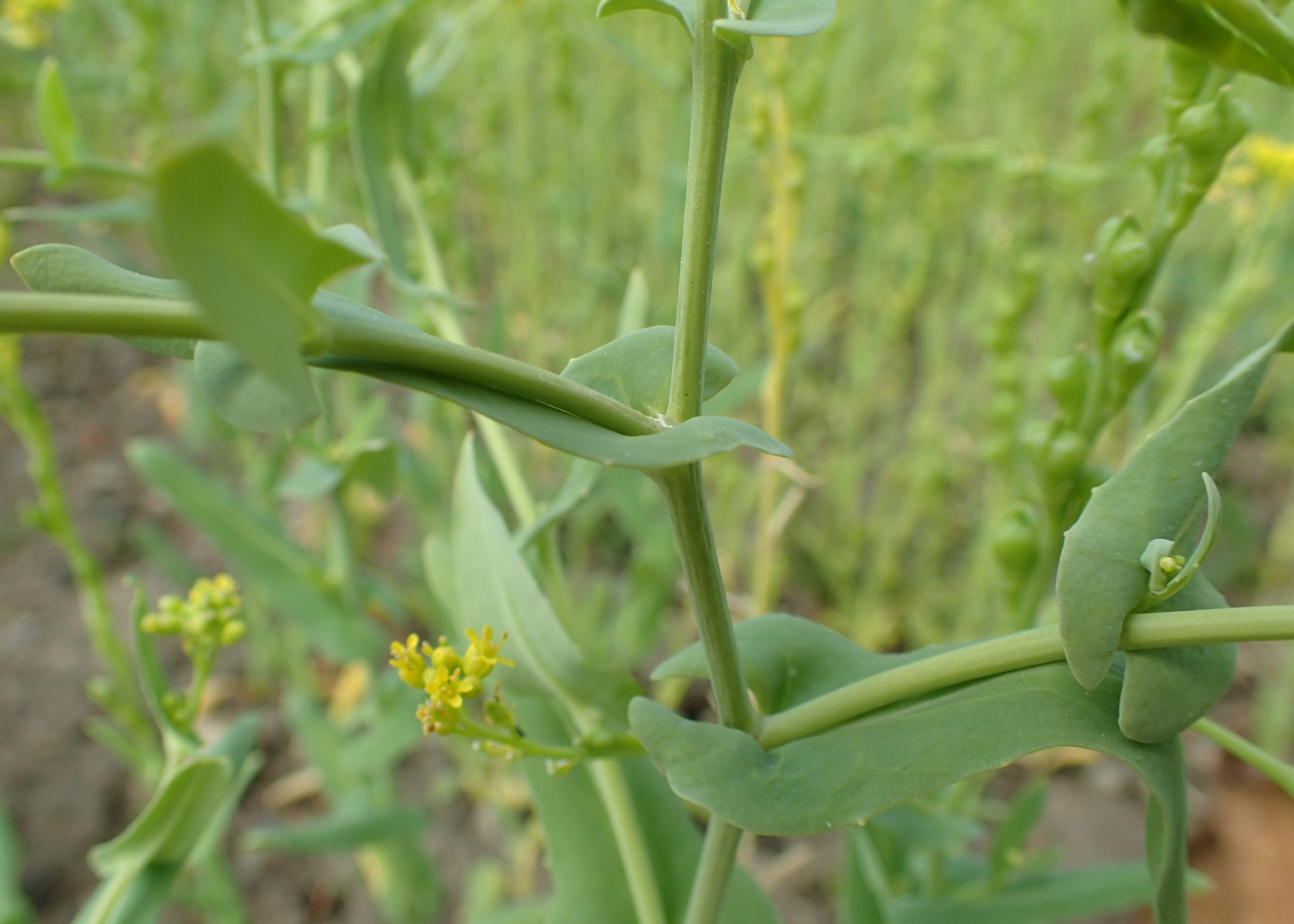
- Myagrum perfoliatum

Scientific classification
- Kingdom: Plantae
- Clade: Tracheophytes
- Clade: Angiosperms
- Clade: Eudicots
- Clade: Rosids
- Order: Brassicales
- Family: Brassicaceae
- Genus: Myagrum; L.
- Species: M. perfoliatum

Binomial name
- Myagrum perfoliatum L.

Synonyms
- Bricour Adans.; Deltocarpus L'Hér. ex DC.

= Myagrum =

Genus of flowering plants

Myagrum, muskweed or musk weed, is a genus of flowering plants in the family Brassicaceae. It has only one species, Myagrum perfoliatum, native to Europe and the Middle East, and an introduced weed in North America, South America, Australia and other places in Asia. It is sister to Isatis.

== Species ==
Presently only one species is considered valid, Myagrum perfoliatum. A large number of species names have been previously associated with Myagrum.

- Myagrum aegyptiacum Panz.
- Myagrum aegyptium L.
- Myagrum alpinum Lapeyr.
- Myagrum alyssum Mill.
- Myagrum americanum Larrañaga
- Myagrum amphibium (L.) Loisel.
- Myagrum amplexicaule Moench
- Myagrum aquaticum Lam.
- Myagrum arborescens Jacq.
- Myagrum argenteum Pursh
- Myagrum armeniacum Steud.
- Myagrum asperum Poir.
- Myagrum auriculatum DC.
- Myagrum austriacum (Crantz) Jacq.
- Myagrum balearicum (L.) Lam.
- Myagrum bauhinii C.C.Gmel.
- Myagrum biarticulatum Crantz
- Myagrum bienne Chaix
- Myagrum bursifolium Thuill.
- Myagrum chlorifolium Willd.
- Myagrum clavatum Lam. [Illegitimate]
- Myagrum clavatum Poir. [Illegitimate]
- Myagrum cornutum L.
- Myagrum coronopus (L.) Crantz
- Myagrum crantzii Vitman
- Myagrum dentatum Willd.
- Myagrum erucaefolium Vill.
- Myagrum erucago Lam.
- Myagrum erucago Crantz
- Myagrum erucifolium Vill.
- Myagrum erucoides Pourr. ex Willk. & Lange
- Myagrum foetidum Bergeret [Invalid]
- Myagrum glabrum Gilib.
- Myagrum grandiflorum Banks ex DC.
- Myagrum hierochunticum (L.) Crantz
- Myagrum hispanicum L.
- Myagrum iberioides Brot.
- Myagrum irregulare Asso
- Myagrum littorale Scop.
- Myagrum monospermum Forssk.
- Myagrum montanum Jean-Pierre Bergeret
- Myagrum natans Patrin ex DC.
- Myagrum orientale L.
- Myagrum palustre (L.) Lam.
- Myagrum paniculatum L.
- Myagrum perenne L.
- Myagrum pinnatifidum Ehrh. ex DC.
- Myagrum pinnatum Sol.
- Myagrum procumbens Pourr.
- Myagrum × prostratrum Bergeret
- Myagrum prostratum Bergeret
- Myagrum prostratum J. P. Bergeret
- Myagrum pumilum Lam.
- Myagrum pyrenaicum (All.) Lam.
- Myagrum rigidum Pall.
- Myagrum rostratum Scop.
- Myagrum rugosum L.
- Myagrum sativum L.
- Myagrum saxatile (L.) L.
- Myagrum sphaerocarpum Jacq.
- Myagrum spinosum (L.) Lam.
- Myagrum stylosum Gochnat ex DC.
- Myagrum syriacum Lam.
- Myagrum syriacum Crantz
- Myagrum taraxacifolium Lam.
- Myagrum tataricum Poir.
- Myagrum utriculatum (L.) Bergeret ex DC.
- Myagrum venosum Pers.
- Myagrum verrucosum Lam.
