= Industrial organization committees (Vichy France) =

Organizational Committees (French: Comités d'organisation) were entities established by the Vichy regime to regulate and control the French economy during the German occupation of France in World War II. Initially intended to protect French economic interests, these committees soon became tools of economic collaboration with Nazi Germany.

== Creation and functioning ==
The Organizational Committees were created by the law of August 16, 1940, to oversee industrial production following the armistice with Germany. They operated under the higher authority of the Central Office for the Allocation of Industrial Products (Office central de répartition des produits industriels, OCRPI), established by the law of September 10, 1940. The OCRPI was attached to the Secretariat of State for Allocation within the Ministry of Commerce and Industry.

The Organizational Committees (CO) were responsible for the "secondary allocation" of resources among the enterprises under their jurisdiction, while the OCRPI managed the "primary allocation." Over time, these allocations increasingly prioritized the needs of German industry.

== Committee structure ==
The number of Organizational Committees grew significantly during the occupation, from 15 in late 1940 to over 200 by the spring of 1944.

=== Committees related to music ===
Between 1941 and 1943, three committees were created to control musical professions under the Vichy government. These committees implemented strict German directives, including the decree of June 6, 1942, which banned Jewish individuals from holding artistic positions in performances, films, and concerts.

=== Committee for the Music Industry and Trade ===
Established by decree on March 16, 1941, this committee was chaired by René Dommange, who oversaw music publishing and production.

=== Professional Committee for Dramatic Authors, Composers, and Music Publishers ===
Directed by composer and conductor Henri Rabaud, this state-affiliated committee managed royalties and reorganized the SACEM. It systematically seized royalties deemed to be "enemy property," including those belonging to Jewish artists, as well as English, American, and French exiles.

=== Committee for Professional Music Organizations ===
Initially established in 1941, it was later renamed the "Committee for Musical Art and Free Music Education" in 1943. Both iterations were chaired by French pianist Alfred Cortot and enforced bans on performances by Jewish artists, their works, and "degenerate art" (Entartete Kunst).

=== Committee for the Entertainment Industry (COES) ===
The COES was created by the decree of August 16, 1940, to regulate theatrical activity. It primarily excluded Jewish personnel, managed funding for performance venues, and coordinated with the German occupiers, including Otto Abetz and the Goethe-Institut.

=== Committee for the Film Industry (COIC) ===
The Comité d'organisation de l'industrie cinématographique (COIC) was tasked with normalizing and controlling film production under Vichy. Established by the August 16, 1940 law, it operated under the Ministry of Information.

=== Committee for the Book Industry ===
Created on May 3, 1941, the Committee for Industries, Arts, and Book Trade oversaw the allocation of paper and censorship of publications. Its members included notable resistance figures such as Marguerite Duras.

=== Other committees ===
==== Textile Industry Committee ====
Managed Franco-German textile agreements.

==== Aeronautical Industry Committee ====
Directed by General Jean Bergeret, this committee facilitated German demands for aircraft production.

==== Automobile Industry Committee ====
Led by François Lehideux, it coordinated French automobile production with the German Generalbevollmächtigte für das Kraftfahrwesen (GBK).

== Operational mode ==
The Organizational Committees relayed Vichy government instructions to businesses. For example, on July 2, 1942, Pierre Laval ordered them to improve labor efficiency in industries supporting the forced labor program.
