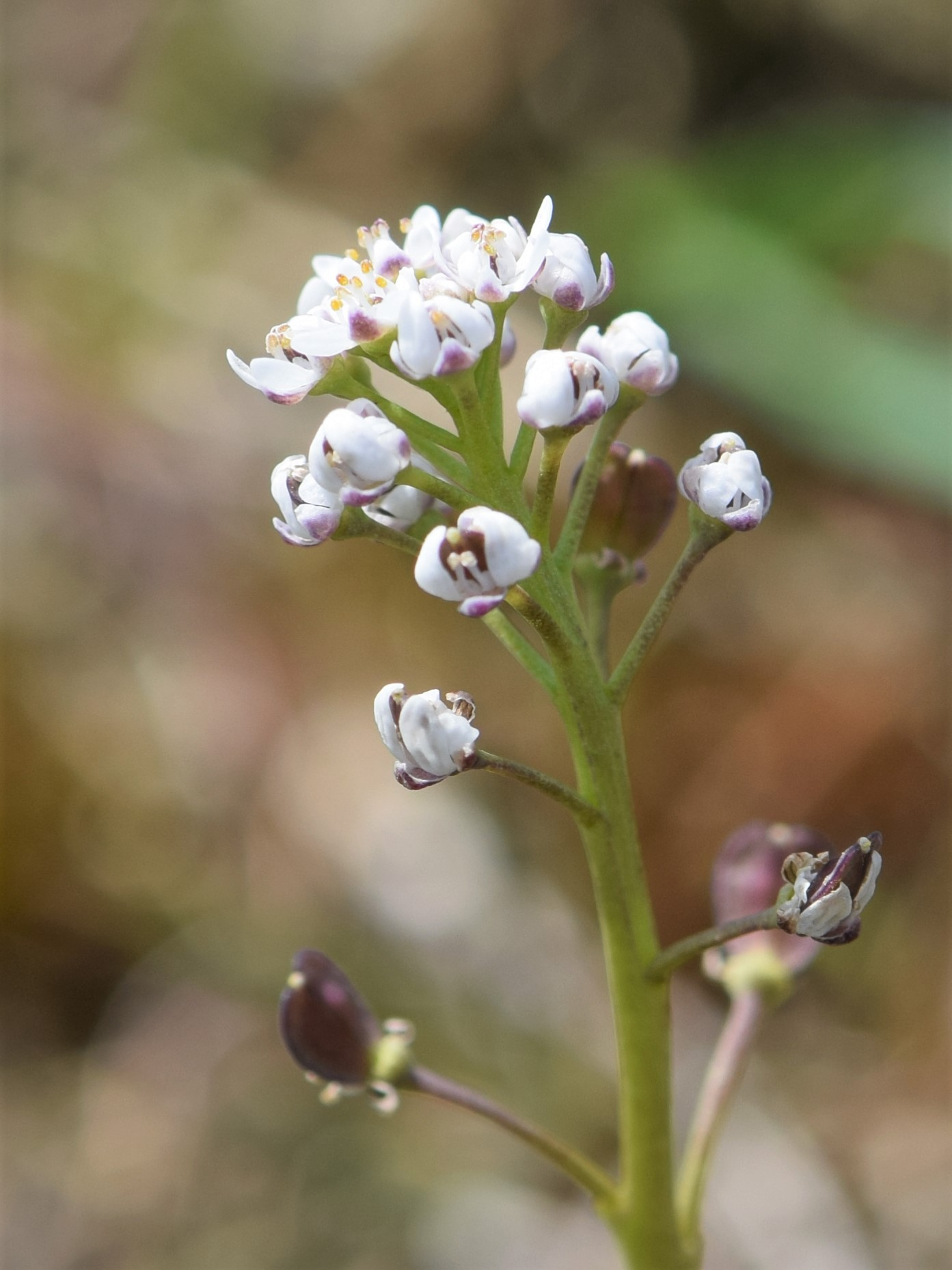
- Close-up of flowers
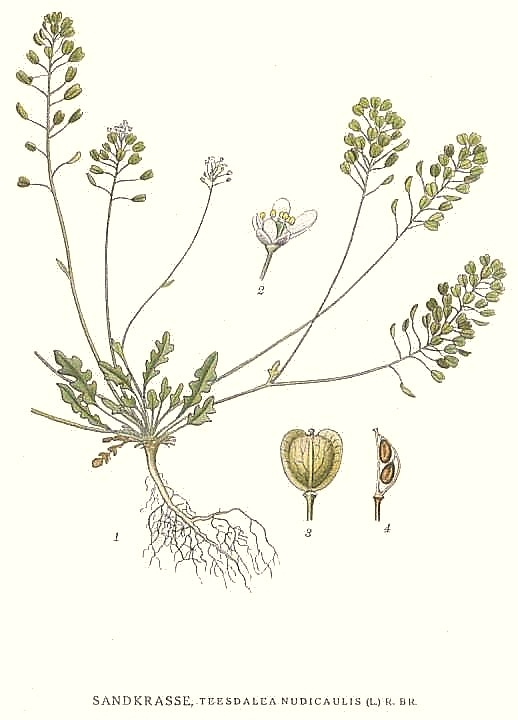
- Botanical illustration

Scientific classification
- Kingdom: Plantae
- Clade: Tracheophytes
- Clade: Angiosperms
- Clade: Eudicots
- Clade: Rosids
- Order: Brassicales
- Family: Brassicaceae
- Genus: Teesdalia
- Species: T. nudicaulis

Binomial name
- Teesdalia nudicaulis (L.) W.T.Aiton

Synonyms
- List: Capsella nudicaulis (L.) Prantl; Crucifera teesdalea E.H.L.Krause; Folis nudicaulis (L.) Dulac; Guepinia iberis DC.; Guepinia nudicaulis (L.) T.Bastard; Iberis bursifolia Bergeret ex DC.; Iberis nudicaulis L.; Lepidium nudicaule L.; Lepidium scapiferum Wallr.; Teesdalia caulescens Holl; Teesdalia iberis DC.; Teesdalia iberis var. foliosa Wimm. & Grab.; Teesdalia iberis var. hirsuta Lej.; Teesdalia iberis var. ramosa Boenn.; Teesdalia irregularis Gray; Teesdalia nudicaulis var. foliosa (Merino) Merino; Teesdalia nudicaulis f. foliosa Merino; Teesdalia nudicaulis var. pusilla Merino; Teesdalia verna Bubani; Thlaspi nudicaule (L.) DC.; Thlaspi nudicaule (L.) Desf.; Thlaspi nudicaule var. nudicaule (L.) Mérat

= Teesdalia nudicaulis =

Species of plant

Teesdalia nudicaulis, or the common shepherd's-cress, is a species of flowering plant in the family Brassicaceae. It is native to Madeira, Morocco, and nearly all of Europe, but has gone locally extinct in Switzerland and Hungary. Additionally, it has been introduced to the east and west coasts of the United States and to southern Chile. An annual, it is found in meadows, fields, and roadsides, typically in anthropogenically disturbed soils.

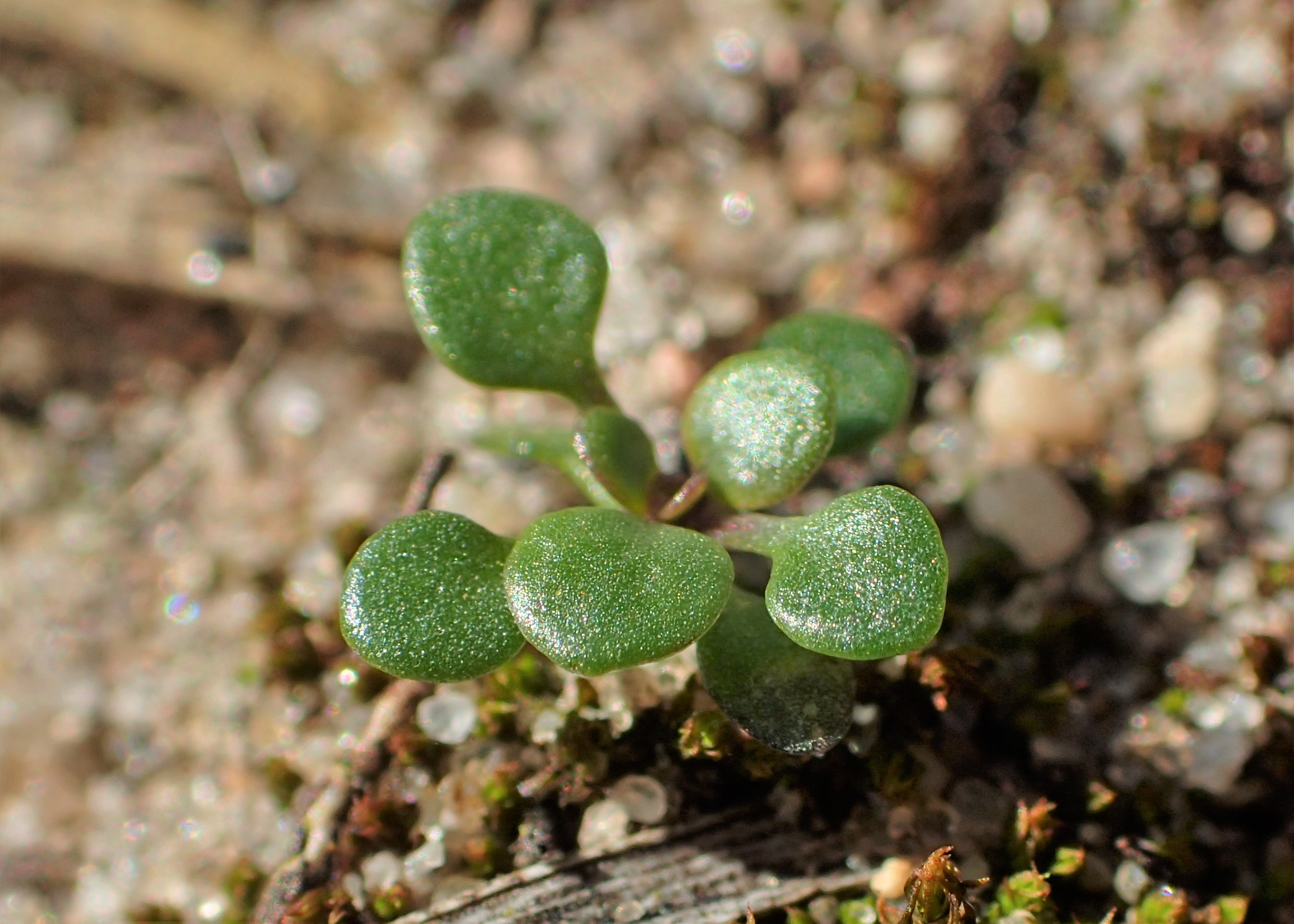
Seedling

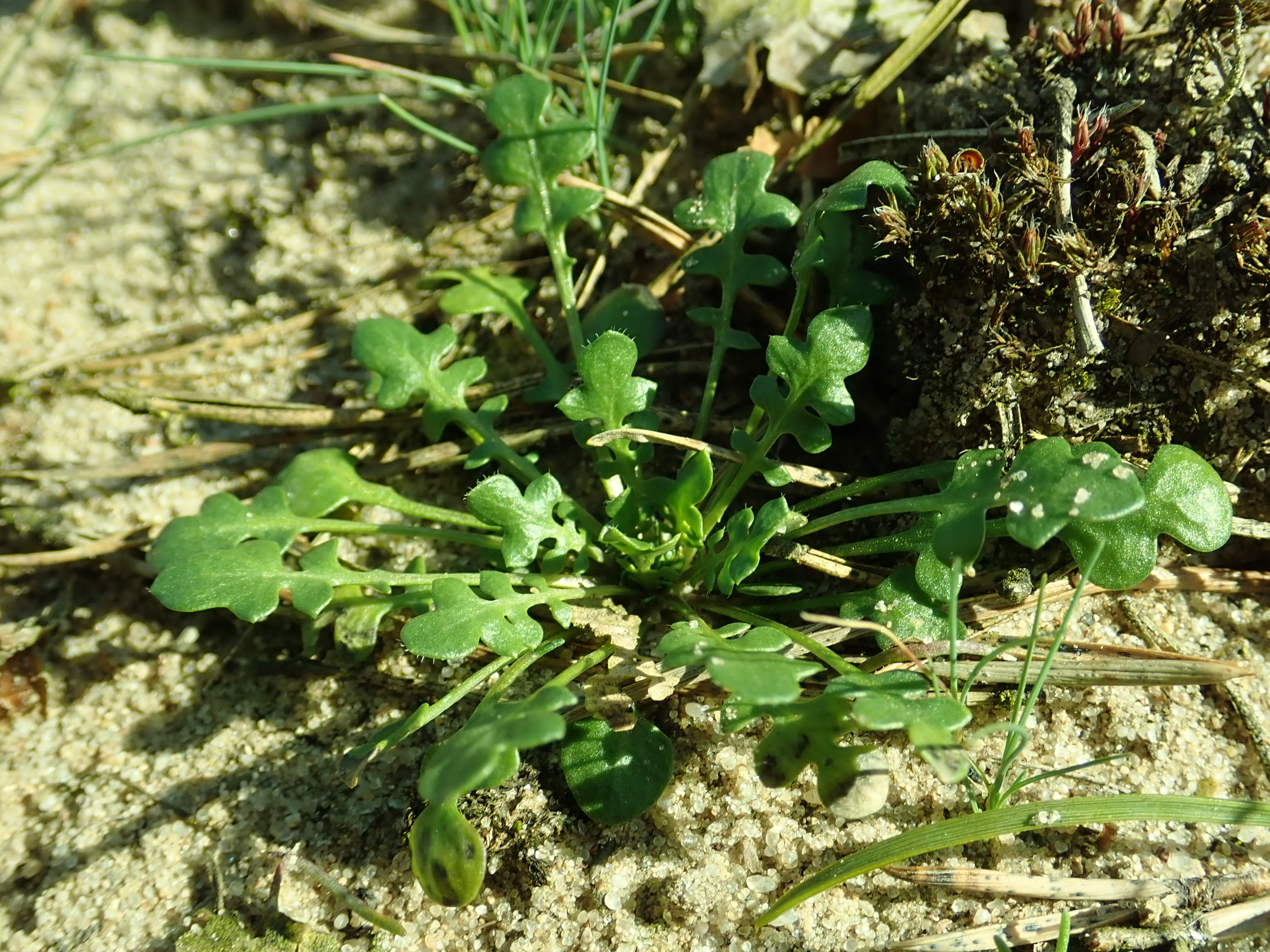
Rosette

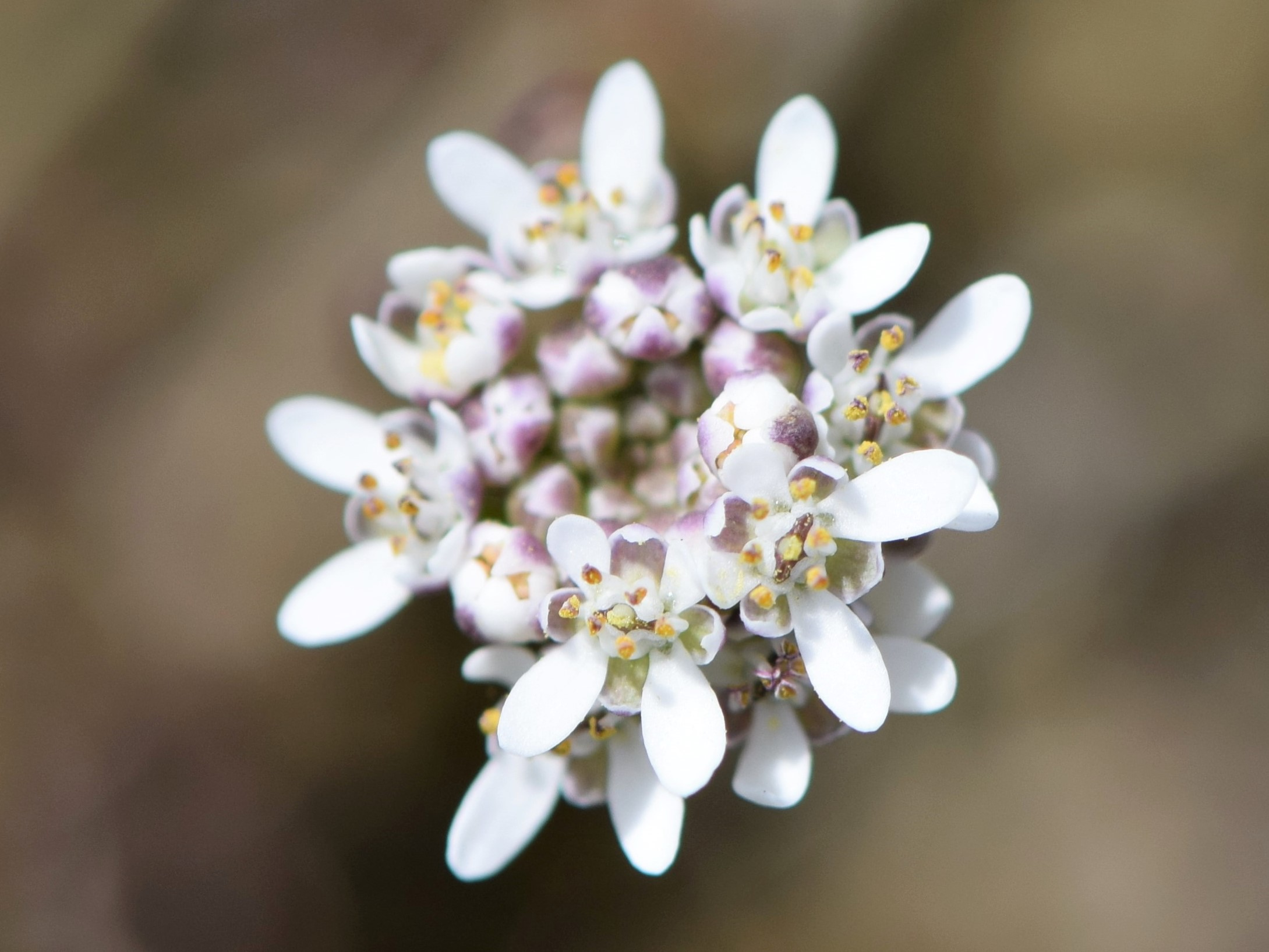
Extreme close-up of flowerhead

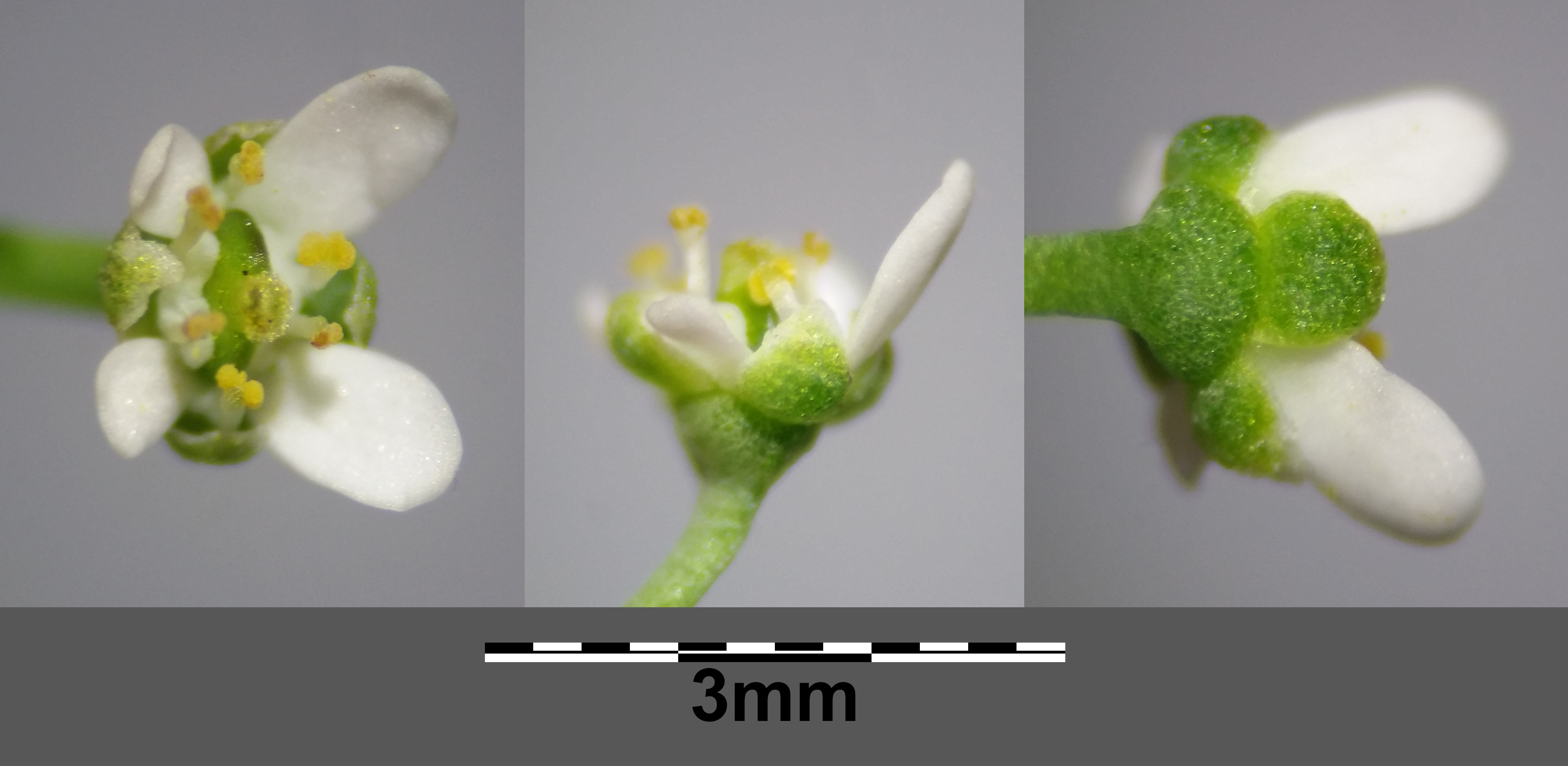
Detail of flowers

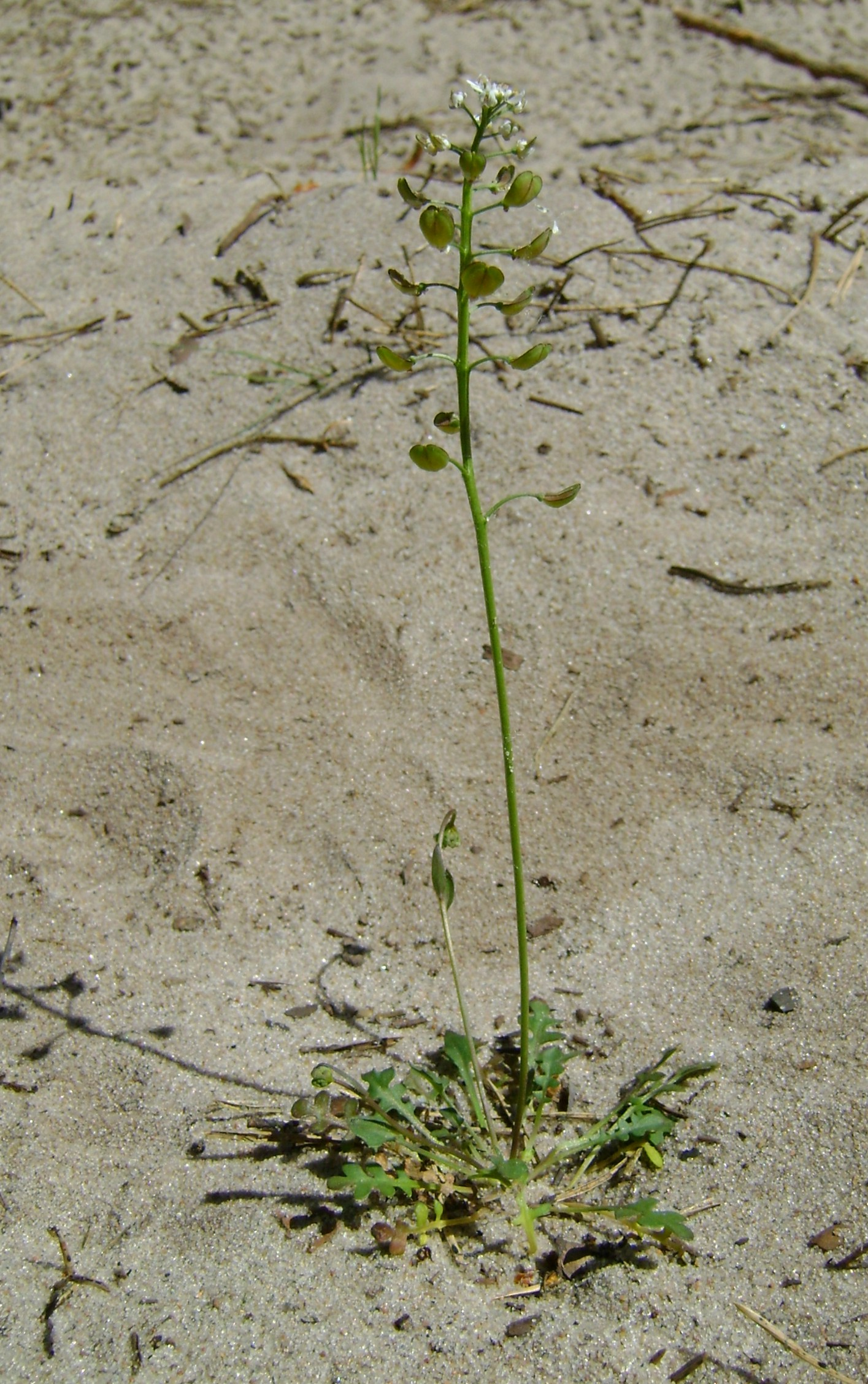
Habit

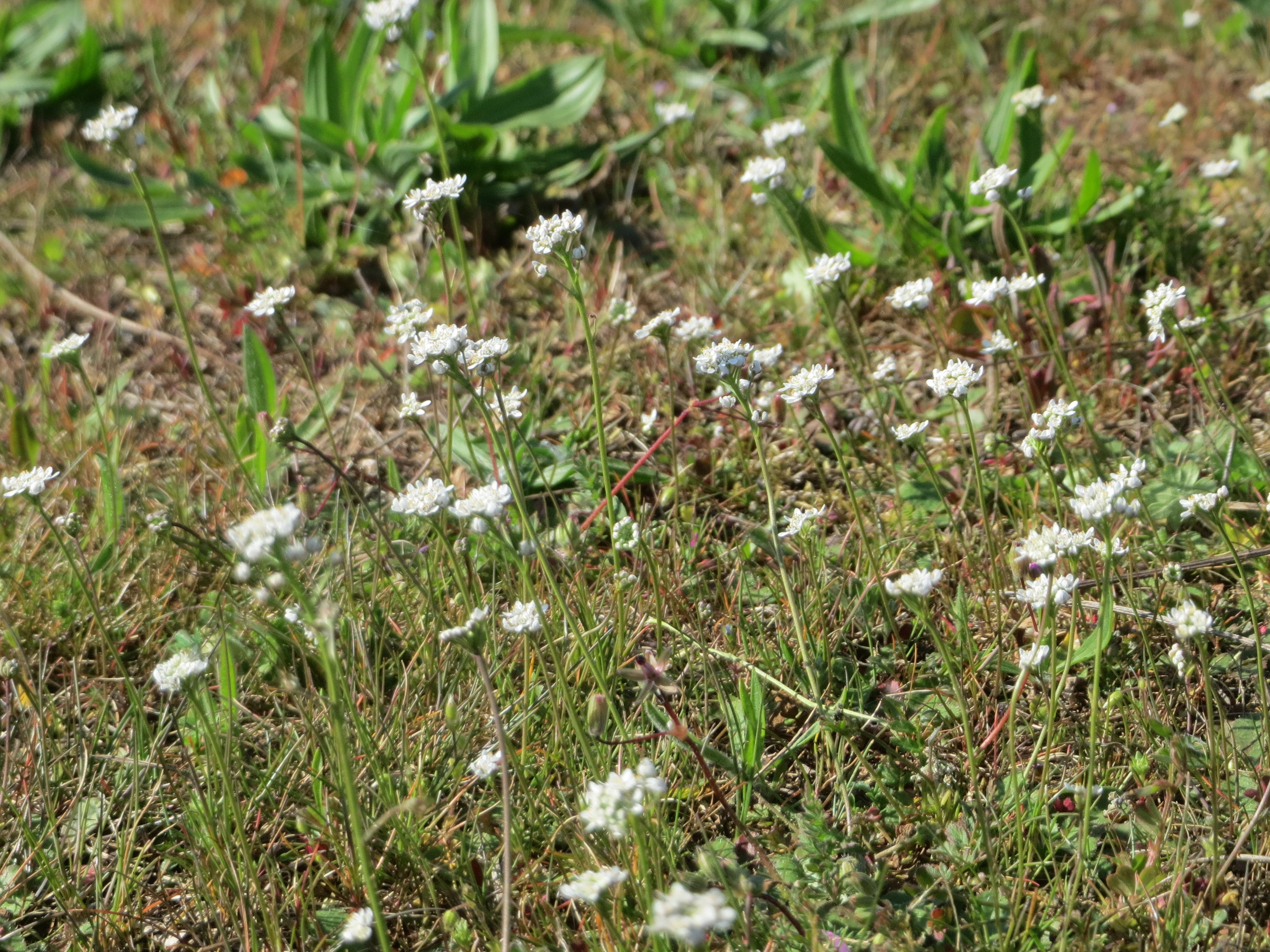
A grouping

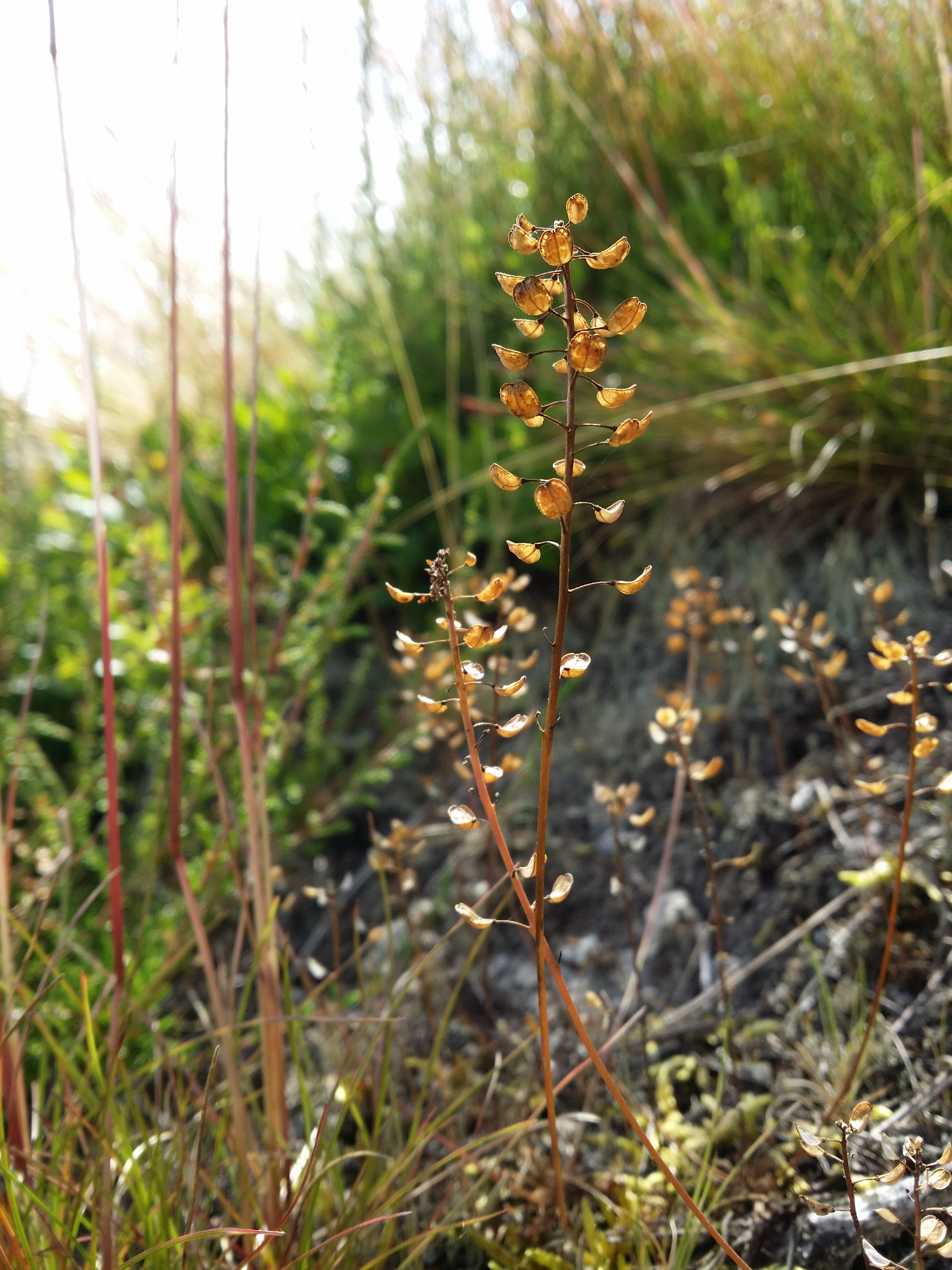
Senescing by July 1st

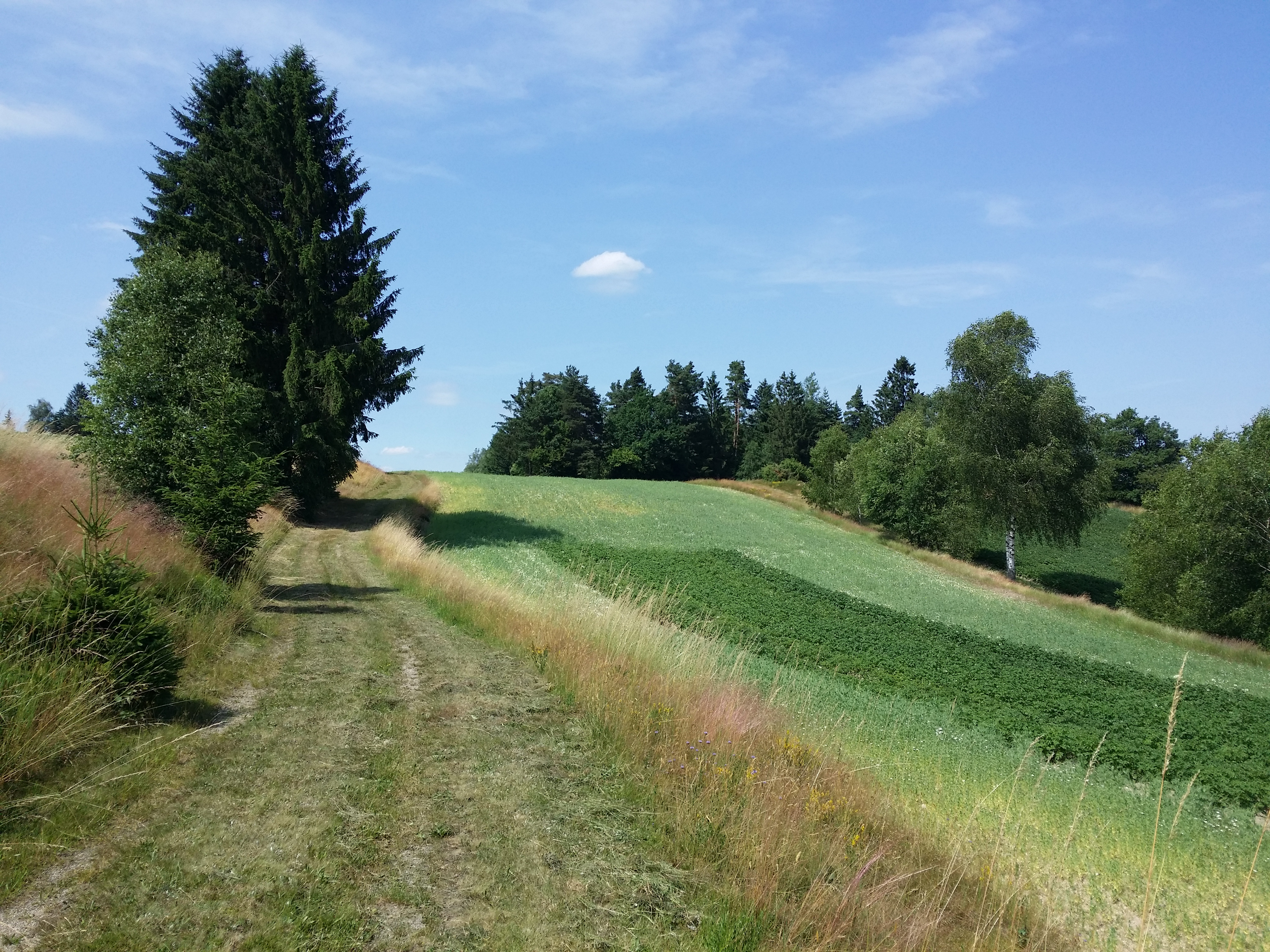
Displaying pronounced zonation on a road verge

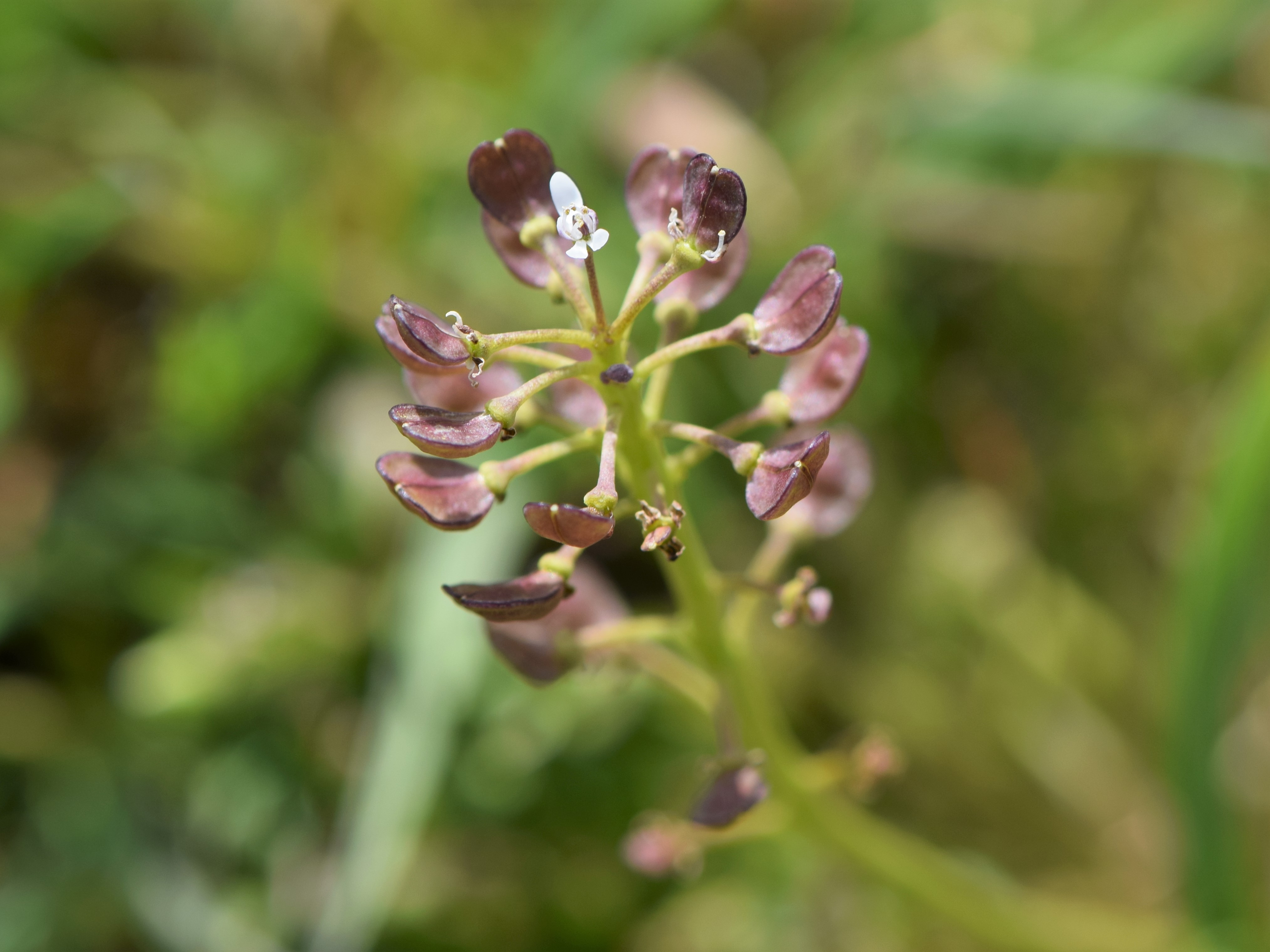
Going to seed

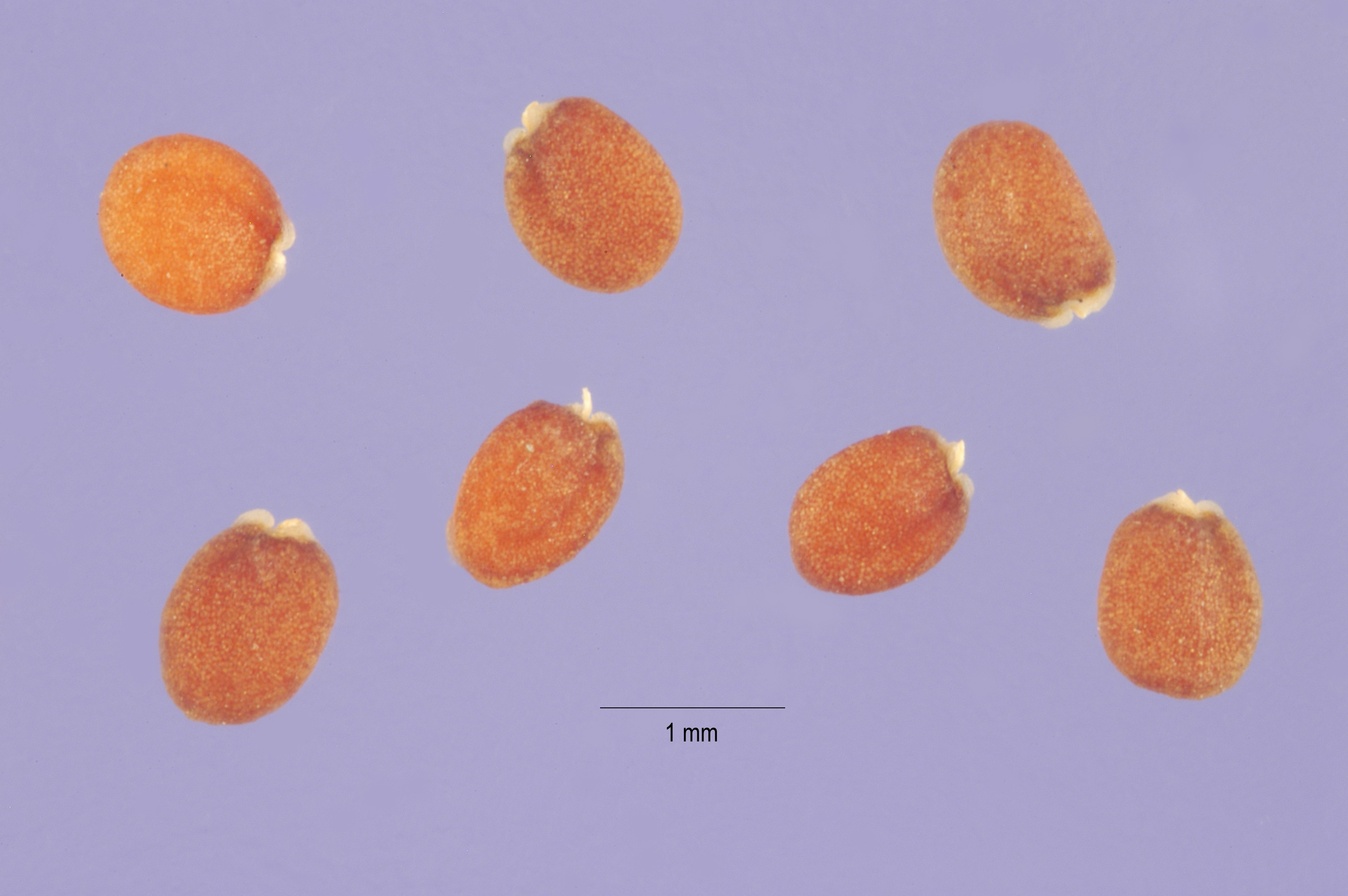
Seeds
