= Jean-Marie Bergeret =

Jean Bergeret
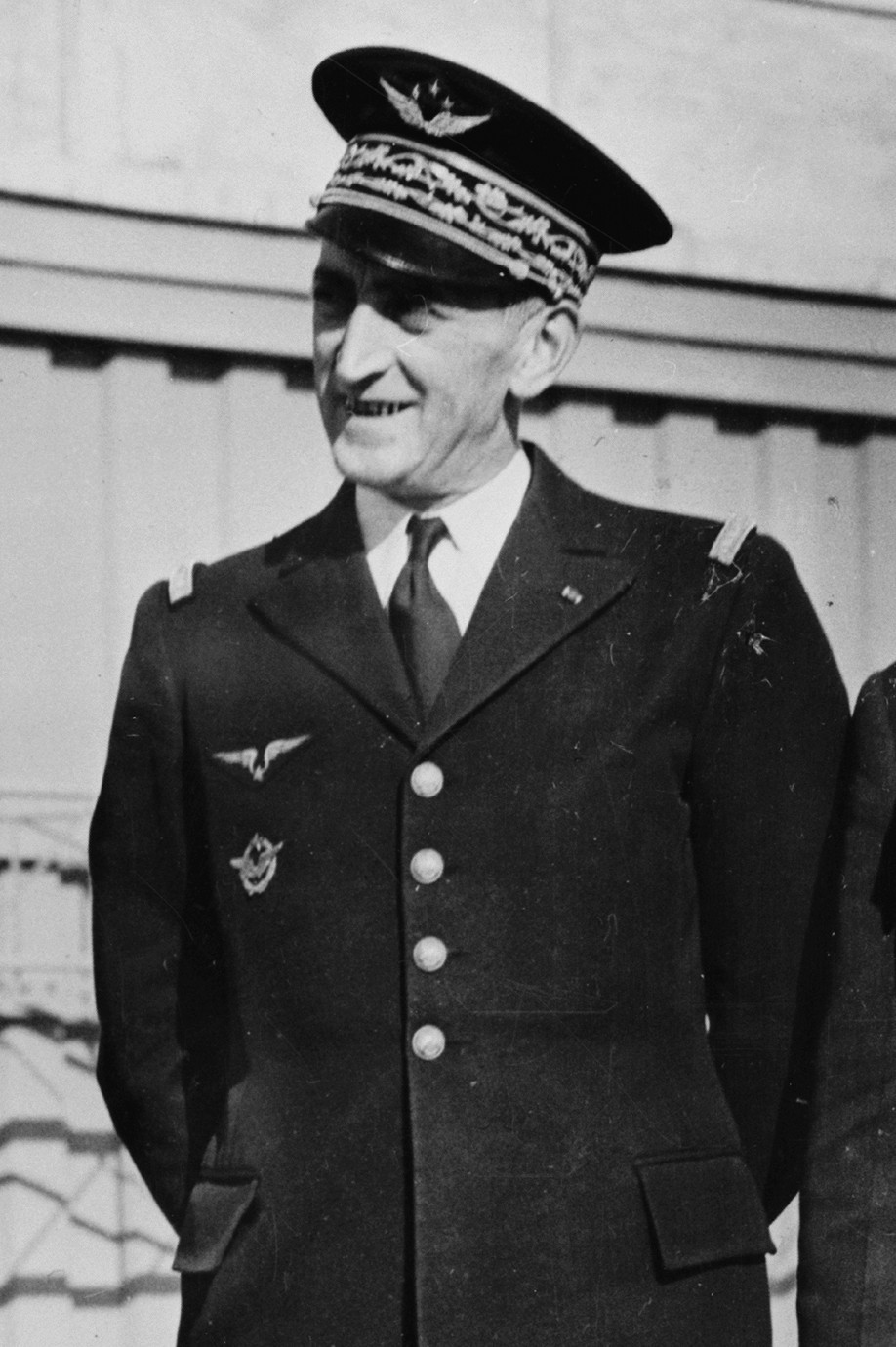
- Born: 23 August 1895; Gray (Haute-Saône)
- Died: 30 November 1956 (aged 61); Neuilly-sur-Seine
- Military career
- Branch: French Air Force
- Rank: Brigadier General

Jean Bergeret (23 August 1895 – 30 November 1956) was a French aviation General.

== Biography ==
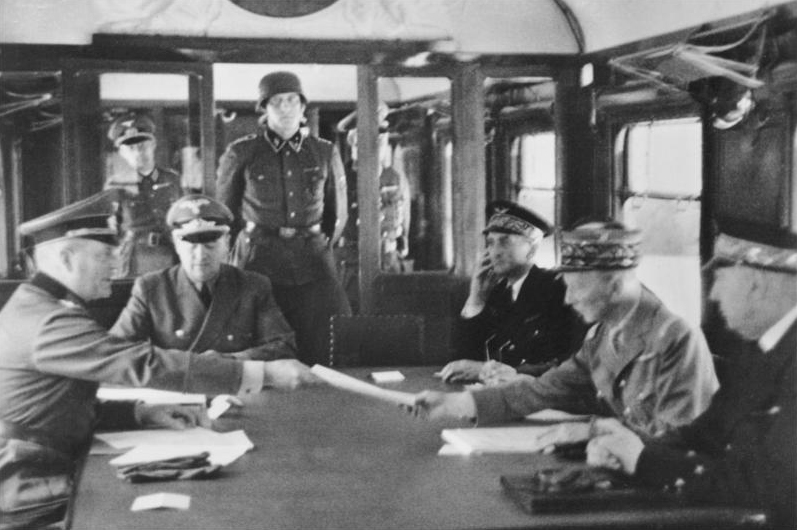
Signing of the Armistice of 22 June 1940. On the left is Marshal Keitel; on the right is the French delegation, including General Charles Huntziger, flanked by Aviation General Jean Bergeret and Vice Admiral Maurice Le Luc (in profile).

After World War I, he attended the École supérieure de guerre and joined the Aviation Staff, in 1928. From December to August 1939, he served as chief of the Third Bureau of the Air Force Staff, and just before the war began, he was promoted to brigadier general.

After the Armistice of 22 June 1940, in which he was part of the French delegation, he was appointed secretary of state for aviation by Marshal Pétain on 6 September 1940, replacing General Bertrand Pujo. He held this position until Pierre Laval's return on 18 April 1942, when he was succeeded by General Jean-François Jannekeyn. Bergeret was then appointed inspector of territorial air defense.

On 9 May 1941, the Commissariat-General for Jewish Affairs submitted a proposal to the Vichy government for a law revising the Statute on Jews of October 1940. Only one ministry, the Secretariat of State for Aviation (SEA), insisted on stricter provisions. On 17 January 1941, it informed the vice president of the council that, unlike other administrations, it had refused to assign alternative positions to Jews removed from their posts. The SEA collaborated with the Reich's Ministry of Aviation, led by Generals Ernst Udet and Erhard Milch, and the German Military Command in France (MBF), which supervised the French aviation industry in occupied zones, expanding its anti-Jewish actions during the German-Soviet conflict in June 1941. Bergeret aggressively targeted Jewish industrialists, including Marcel Bloch and Paul-Louis Weiller.

A few days after Operation Torch, during which Allied forces landed in North Africa on 8 November 1942, Bergeret rallied to General Giraud and served as deputy high commissioner for civil and military command in North Africa. The Vichy regime subsequently stripped him of French citizenship.

He received the Order of the Francisque.

At the end of 1943, the French Committee of National Liberation in Algiers initiated legal proceedings against Bergeret. He was arrested on 23 October 1943. Referred to the High Court of Justice for trial, he was provisionally released in September 1945, and a final dismissal of charges was granted on 25 November 1948.

Jean Bergeret had three children with Hélène Disle: Anne-Marie, Jean-Pierre, and Françoise.

== Bibliography ==
- Claude d'Abzac-Epezy, "Le général Bergeret et l'Armée de l'air de Vichy," Revue historique des armées, 192, 3/1993, pp. 32–43;
- Claude d'Abzac-Epezy, "Le secrétariat d’État à l’aviation et la politique d’exclusion des Juifs (1940–1944)," Archives Juives, no. 41/1, 1st semester 2008, pp. 75–90

== Filmography ==
- 1975: Section spéciale, directed by Costa-Gavras; role played by Jean-Marie Robain.
