= Claude Njiké-Bergeret =

Camaroonian writer

- Born: Claude Bergeret; 5 June 1943 (age 83)
- Citizenship: Cameroon
- Writing career
- Language: French

Claude Njiké-Bergeret (born 5 June 1943, at Douala, Cameroon) is the grand daughter and daughter of the French Protestant missionaries Etienne Bergeret and Charles Bergeret which worked in the first half of the 20th century in the bamiléké area in Cameroon. She is the widow of the polygamic Bangangté chief Francois Njiké Pokam. She is also a book writer, farmer and community organiser near Foumbot.

== Life ==
=== Childhood in Bangangté ===
Claude Njiké-Bergeret was born 5 June 1943, of French parents in Cameroon, Africa. Her grandfather, Etienne Bergeret was a Protestant missionary in New Caledonia and Cameroon from 1917 to 1921.

Her parents were assigned to Cameroon. Her father Charles Bergeret became pastor after his own father Etienne got married in 1937 to Yvette Guiton, a social worker in France.

Younger than Jean-Pierre (1938), Claude was born on 5 June 1943 in the European hospital in Douala. When she was three years old, her parents settled in Bangangté. There, they built the public school of Mfetom, where Njiké-Bergeret spent her first school years. She learned to live with the local people and built friendships with them. By associating with the local people, she also learned to speak the local language of the Bangangté. The Bangangté are a people belonging to the Bamileke. The fon is the formal head of around 60,000 adherents.

Her father was mobilised as to participate in the liberation of France.

Claude was 3 years old in 1946 when her sister Mireille was born. The Bergerets left France for Cameroon again after World War II. They were assigned to Bangangté where Charles Bergeret replaced the pastor Dieterlé. Dieterlé had founded, six years ago, the mission of Mfetom, on a piece of land donated by the chief Njike II. They founded the school of Mfetom. At the time only for girls. Claude spends her elementary school years and grew up there with native girls, without overprotection. Among them, she learned the local Bamiléké language.

=== Life in France ===
In 1956, when Claude was thirteen years old, her parents moved back to France, where Claude finished high school. She married a Frenchman and had two children, Serge in 1966 and Laurent in 1968. She studied Geography at the University of Aix-en-Provence. While in Aix she was involved in the student protests of 1968.

=== Back again to Cameroon ===
After her marriage failed in 1972, she decided to go back to Cameroon. In 1974 she signed a contract with the same missionary society her father worked for to go back as a teacher to Cameroon. There, she followed in the footsteps of her parents as director of the public girls' school of Mfetom. During this time, she became closely involved in the local social life. In 1978, she provoked a scandal when she married the local fon (chief) Njiké Pokam François, even though he lived with nearly 30 women in polygamy. She had two children with him, Sophia in 1978 and Rudolf in 1980. After the death of Njiké Pokam François (born 13 July 1946, died 7 December 1987) Claude acquired a small piece of land and lived a rural life.

She had become locally famous under the name reine blanche (white queen). By her own admission, the marriage of an educated, Protestant, white woman to a local chief was a unique position that attracted the attention of all of Cameroon.

Claude Njiké-Bergeret is a mediator between European and African values. She reformed education in Mfetom by including more local history in her lessons and acquiring a clearer understanding of the local customs. She has lobbied for a better image of Africa in France since the 1970s. In 1997, she published her autobiography, Ma Passion Africaine (My African Passion). In 2000, her second book, La Sagesse de Mon Village (The Wisdom of my Village) was published. Her books deliver rare insights into the rites and culture of the Bangangté. The books have been translated into German, but not into English.

== Work ==
=== Written books ===
- Ma passion africaine, JC Lattès, 1997. Réédition J'ai lu, no 4903, 2000. (384p.). ISBN 2 290 30979 6. Autobiography.
- La sagesse de mon village, JC Lattès, 2000. (220p.). ISBN 2 7096 2075 8. Autobiography.
- Agis d'un seul cœur, JC Lattès, 4 February 2009 (252 pages). ISBN 2 709 62243 2

=== Agropastoral work ===
Claude lives in Nkoutchoup along the river Noun at 20 km from Bangangte with her family and friends where she takes care of a farm.

== Sources ==
- site sur Claude Njiké-Bergeret
- "Claude Njiké-Bergeret, la "Reine blanche" du Cameroun – flatilla". fannyborius.over-blog.com.
- "Rencontre avec Claude Njiké-Bergeret : "la Reine Blanche" (Cameroun) – flatilla". fannyborius.over-blog.com.
- Envoyé spécial de France 2 Envoy%E9+sp%E9cial')&order=TICOL
- "CAMERTUBES : La vie au Cameroun – Rencontre avec Claude Njike Bergeret". epinett.com. Archived from the original on 24 July 2013.
