= Lasseube =

- Commune
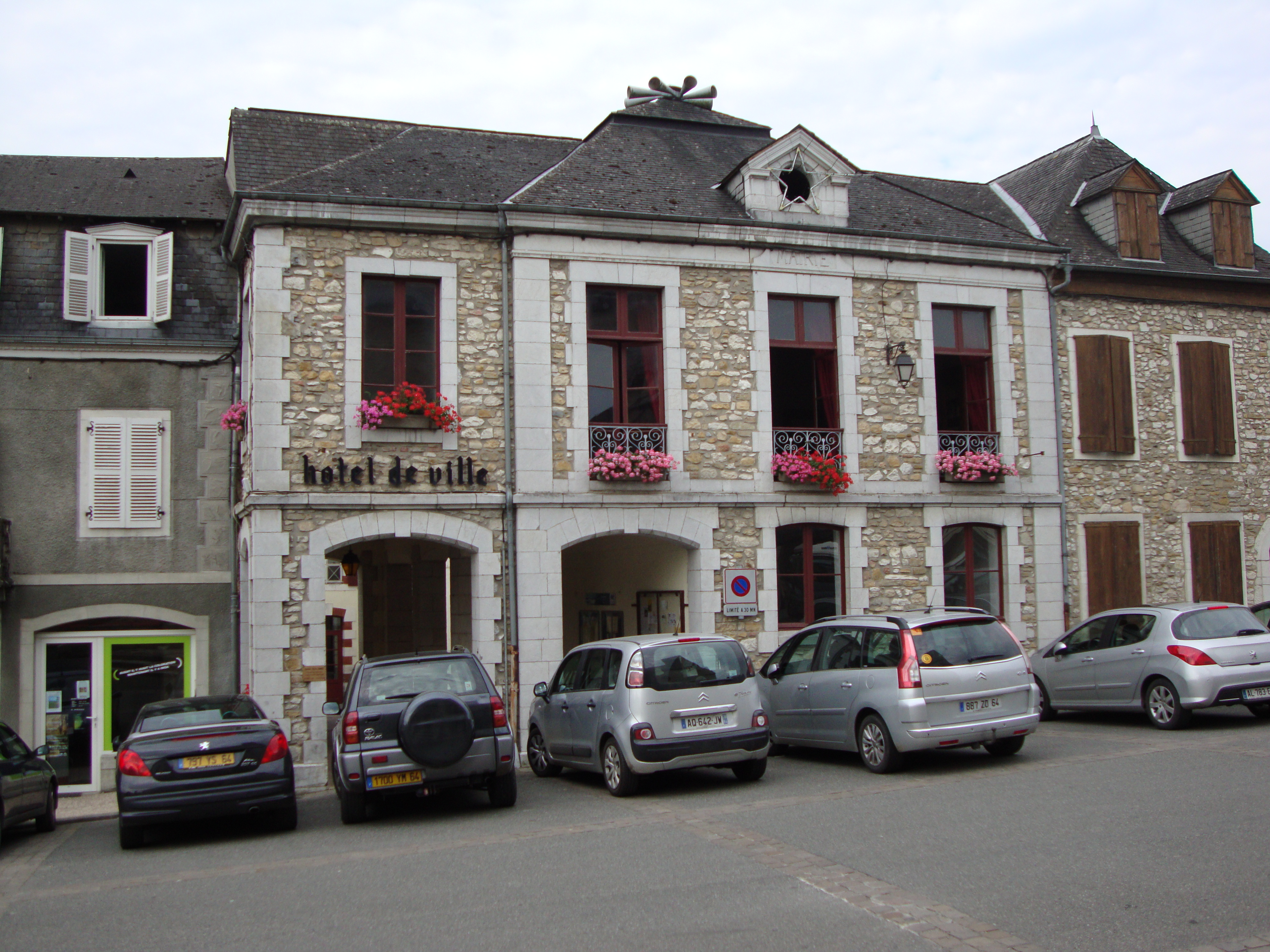
- Town Hall
- Location of Lasseube
- Location within France Location within Nouvelle-Aquitaine
- Coordinates: 43°13′19″N 0°28′41″W
- Country: France
- Region: Nouvelle-Aquitaine
- Department: Pyrénées-Atlantiques
- Arrondissement: Oloron-Sainte-Marie
- Canton: Oloron-Sainte-Marie-2
- Intercommunality: Haut Béarn

Government
  - Mayor (2020–2026): Laurent Keller
- Area^{1}: 48.60 km^{2} (18.76 sq mi)
- Elevation: 185 m (607 ft)
- Highest elevation: 416 m (1,365 ft)
- Lowest elevation: 170 m (560 ft)
- Population (2023): 1,735
  - Density: 35.70/km^{2} (92.46/sq mi)
- Time zone: UTC+01:00 (CET)
  - Summer (DST): UTC+02:00 (CEST)
- INSEE/Postal code: 64324 /64290
- ^{1} French Land Register data, which excludes lakes, ponds, glaciers > 1 km^{2} (0.386 sq mi or 247 acres) and river estuaries.

Lasseube (French pronunciation: [lasœb]; Occitan: La Seuva) is a commune in the Pyrénées-Atlantiques department in south-western France.

== See also ==
- Communes of the Pyrénées-Atlantiques department
