= Jean-Paul Cointet =

French historian

- Occupation: Historian
- Spouse: Michèle Cointet

Jean-Paul Cointet is a French historian. He is Professor emeritus of 20th century history at the University of Picardie Jules Verne in Amiens, and he serves on the board of the Institut Georges Pompidou. He was the recipient of two prizes from the Académie française: the Prix d’Académie in 1999, and the Prix Thiers for Hippolyte Taine : Un regard sur la France in 2012.

== Works ==
- Cointet, Jean-Paul (1975). La France libre. Paris: Presses universitaires de France. OCLC 42395513.
- Cointet, Jean-Paul; Cointet, Michèle (1990). La France à Londres : renaissance d'un Etat (1940-1943). Bruxelles: Editions Complexe. ISBN 9782870273296. OCLC 22134992.
- Cointet, Jean-Paul (1993). Pierre Laval. Paris: Fayard. ISBN 9782213028415. OCLC 33360907.
- Cointet, Jean-Paul (1995). La légion française des combattants : la tentation du fascisme (1940-1944). Paris: Albin Michel. ISBN 9782226078674. OCLC 407142224.
- Cointet, Jean-Paul (1998). Marcel Déat : du socialisme au national-socialisme. Paris: Perrin. ISBN 9782262012274. OCLC 40417243.
- Cointet, Jean-Paul (1996). Histoire de Vichy. Paris: Plon. ISBN 9782259180894. OCLC 233807115.
- Cointet, Jean-Paul; Cointet, Michèle, eds. (2000). Dictionnaire historique de la France sous l'Occupation. Paris: Tallandier. ISBN 9782235022347. OCLC 43706422.
- Cointet, Jean-Paul, ed. (2001). Un politique, Georges Pompidou : actes du colloque des 25 et 26 novembre 1999 au Sénat. Paris: Presses universitaires de France. ISBN 9782130515685. OCLC 708551917.
- Cointet, Jean-Paul (2001). Paris 40-44. Paris: Perrin. ISBN 9782262015169. OCLC 46935430.
- Cointet, Jean-Paul (2003). Sigmaringen : une France en Allemagne (septembre 1944 - avril 1945). Paris: Perrin. ISBN 9782262018238. OCLC 53177824.
- Cointet, Jean-Paul (2008). Expier Vichy : l'Épuration en France, 1943-1958. Paris: Perrin. ISBN 9782262022006. OCLC 470918209.
- Cointet, Jean-Paul; Lachaise, Bernard; Tricaud, Sabrina (2008). Georges Pompidou et les élections (1962-1974). Bruxelles: P. Lang. ISBN 9789052013367. OCLC 471024326.
- Cointet, Jean-Paul (2012). Hippolyte Taine : un regard sur la France. Paris: Perrin. ISBN 9782262033668. OCLC 775064096.
- Cointet, Jean-Paul (2014). Hitler et la France. Paris: Perrin. ISBN 9782262039639. OCLC 892720524.
