= Michèle Cointet =

French historian

- Occupation: Historian
- Spouse: Jean-Paul Cointet

Michèle Cointet is a French historian. She is a professor of 20th century history at the University of Poitiers. She is the recipient of two prizes from the Académie française: the Prix François Millepierres for Vichy capitale, 1940-1944 in 1994, and the Prix François Millepierres for L’Église sous Vichy. La repentance en question in 1999.

== Biography ==
Born in Poitiers, she holds an Agrégation in history and a Doctorate in literature. She has taught contemporary history at the University of Tours. A specialist in the Vichy France, she won the Prix François-Millepierres for her book L'Église sous Vichy 1940-1945 and the Prix Jacques-Chabannes from the Association des écrivains combattants for her Nouvelle Histoire de Vichy.

Cointet is married to historian Jean-Paul Cointet.

== Works ==
- Cointet, Michèle (1987). Vichy et le fascisme : les hommes, les structures et les pouvoirs. Bruxelles: Editions Complexe. ISBN 9782870272121. OCLC 18177445.
- Cointet, Michèle (1988). Histoire culturelle de la France : 1918-1958. Paris: SEDES. ISBN 9782718138503. OCLC 20992653.
- Cointet, Michèle (1989). Le Conseil national de Vichy : vie politique et réforme de l'Etat en régime autoritaire, 1940-1944. Paris: Aux Amateurs de livres. ISBN 9782878410006. OCLC 25095218.
- Cointet, Jean-Paul; Cointet, Michèle (1990). La France à Londres : renaissance d'un Etat (1940-1943). Bruxelles: Editions Complexe. ISBN 9782870273296. OCLC 22134992.
- Cointet, Michèle (1993). Vichy capitale : 1940-1944. Paris: Perrin. ISBN 9782262010133. OCLC 28239183.
- Cointet, Michèle (1995). De Gaulle et l'Algérie française, 1958-1962. Paris: Perrin. ISBN 9782262000776. OCLC 34406158.
- Cointet, Michèle (1998). L'Église sous Vichy : 1940-1945 : la repentance en question. Paris: Perrin.
- Cointet, Jean-Paul; Cointet, Michèle, eds. (2000). Dictionnaire historique de la France sous l'Occupation. Paris: Tallandier. ISBN 9782235022347. OCLC 43706422.
- Cointet, Michèle (2002). Pétain et les Français : 1940-1951. Paris: Perrin. ISBN 9782262016371. OCLC 49952299.
- Cointet, Michèle (2005). De Gaulle et Giraud : l'affrontement, 1942-1944. Paris: Perrin. ISBN 9782262020231. OCLC 62292966.
- Cointet, Michèle (2006). Marie-Madeleine Fourcade : un chef de la résistance. Paris: Perrin. ISBN 9782262023652. OCLC 73801325.
- Cointet, Michèle (2011). Nouvelle histoire de Vichy : 1940-1945. Paris: Fayard. ISBN 9782213635538. OCLC 780258292.
- Cointet, Michèle (2013). La milice française. Paris: Fayard. ISBN 9782213670676. OCLC 859446422.
- Cointet, Michèle (2015). Secrets et mystères de la France occupée. Paris: Fayard. ISBN 9782213682563. OCLC 921124531.
