= Jean Bergeret =

French physician and botanist (1751–1813)

Jean Bergeret (born 1751 in Lescar - died 1813 in Paris) was a French doctor and botanist.

== Biography ==
After his marriage in 1771, he studied philosophy and graduated in 1773. After his separation from his wife in 1780, he moved to Morlaàs and began studying medicine and obtained his doctorate in 1788. During the revolution he was mayor of Morlaàs. Besides practicing medicine, he taught natural history at the École centrale de Pau from 1796 to 1802. In X (1803), he wrote his only work: La Flore des Basses-Pyrénées (two volumes, Pau). There it follows the Linnean classification . Bergeret dies of an epidemic of fever affecting the region. His son, Eugène Bergeret (1799-1868), after studying medicine in Paris, replaced him as doctor and as mayor.

== Bibliography ==
- Adrien Davy de Virville (dir.) (1955). History of botany in France. SEDES (Paris): 394 p.
- Benedict Dayrat (2003). The Botanists and the Flora of France, three centuries of discoveries. Scientific publications of the National Museum of Natural History: 690 p.
