= Jean-Pierre Bergeret =

French botanist

- Born: 1751; Lasseube (Béarn
- Died: 1813 (aged 61–62); Paris
- Occupation: botanist

Jean-Pierre Bergeret (1751–1813) was a French botanist. He was born on 25 November 1751, in Lasseube (Béarn), and died on 28 March 1813, in Paris. He was the author of the following:

- Phytonomatotechnie universelle, c'est-à-dire, l'art de donner aux plantes des noms tirés de leurs caractères, 1783–84.
- Flore des Basses-Pyrénées, 1803 (with Eugène Bergeret; Gaston Bergeret) – Flora of Basses-Pyrénées.
