= List of Third Republic ministers of the Pétain administration =

The following is a list of the French government ministers in the administration of Pétain under the Third Republic.

Title	Office holder	Party
Président du Conseil	Philippe Pétain	SE
Vice-Presidents of the Council	Camille Chautemps (16 June - 12 July)	RAD
Vice-Presidents of the Council	Pierre Laval (starting 23 June 1940)	SE
Ministers of State
Ministers of State	Camille Chautemps	RAD
Ministers of State	Adrien Marquet (starting 23 June 1940)	SE
Ministers of State	Pierre Laval (starting 23 June 1940)	SE
Ministers
Minister for Foreign Affairs	Paul Baudoin	SE
Minister of Finance and Commerce	Yves Bouthillier	SE
Minister of War	Louis Colson	SE
Ministre of National Defense	Maxime Weygand	SE
Guardian of the Seals, Minister of Justice	Charles Frémicourt	SE
Minister of National Education	Albert Rivaud	SE
Minister of the Interior	Charles Pomaret	USR
Minister of the Interior	Adrien Marquet (starting 27 June 1940)	SE
Minister of the Merchant and Military Marine	François Darlan	SE
Minister of Air	Bertrand Pujo	SE
Minister of Public Works and Information	Ludovic-Oscar Frossard	USR
	Albert Chichery	RAD
Minister of Transmissions	André Février (starting 23 juin 1940)	SFIO
Minister of the Colonies	Albert Rivière	SFIO
Minister of Labour and Public Health	André Février	SFIO
Minister of Labour and Public Health	Charles Pomaret (starting 27 June 1940)	USR
Minister for Veterans and the French Family	Jean Ybarnegaray	PSF
High Commissioner for French Propaganda	Jean Prouvost (starting 19 June 1940)	SE
Commissioners-General
Commissioner-General for Resupply	Joseph Frédéric Bernard (starting 18 June 1940)	SE
Commissioner-General for National Reconstruction	Aimé Doumenc (starting 26 June 1940)	SE
Under-Secretaries of State
Under-Secretary of State to the Office of the Council President	Raphaël Alibert	SE
Under-Secretary of State for Refugees	Robert Schuman	PDP

== See also ==
- Government of Vichy France
- Fall of France
- Maurice Papon
- Service du travail obligatoire
- Vichy France
- Vichy 80
- Vichy Holocaust collaboration timeline
- Occupied France
- Zone libre

== Sources ==
- Bernstein, Serge (2012). "Le gouvernement Pétain du 16 juin au 10 juillet 1940" [The Pétain government of 16 June to 10 July 1940]. In Pierre Allorant; Noëlline Castagnez-Ruggiu; Antoine Prost (dir.) (eds.). Le moment 1940 : effondrement national et réalités locales : actes du colloque international d'Orléans, les 18 et 19 novembre 2010 [The 1940 moment: national collapse and local realities: Proceedings of the International Colloquy in Orléans, November 18–19, 2010]. Cliopolis. Paris: Harmattan/Pepper. pp. 77–90. ISBN 978-2-296-96634-5. OCLC 795496243.
- Cointet, Michèle (2011). Nouvelle histoire de Vichy (1940–1945) [New History of Vichy (1940–1945)] (in French). Paris: Fayard. ISBN 978-2-213-63553-8. OCLC 760147069.
- Prost, Antoine (2012). "La controverse juridique : 16 juin ou 10 juillet?" [The judicial conteroversy: 16 June or 10 July?]. In Pierre Allorant; Noëlline Castagnez; Antoine Prost (dir.) (eds.). Le moment 1940 : effondrement national et réalités locales : actes du colloque international d'Orléans, les 18 et 19 novembre 2010 [The 1940 moment: national collapse and local realities: Proceedings of the International Colloquy in Orléans, November 18–19, 2010]. Cliopolis. Paris: Harmattan/Pepper. pp. 91–99. ISBN 978-2-296-96634-5. OCLC 795496243.
- Vergez-Chaignon, Bénédicte (2014). Pétain (in French). Paris: Perrin. ISBN 978-2-262-03885-4. OCLC 896479806.
