= Vichy anti-communist and anti-anarchist laws =

(France) Vichy Regime
- Enacted: 14 August 1941 - 20 January 1944

The Vichy anti-communist and anti-anarchist laws were a series of legal measures adopted by the Vichy regime to repress communists, anarchists, and more broadly, the French Resistance. As the first anti-terrorist laws in French history, they were initially aligned with the anti-anarchist legislation initiated by the lois scélérates, before evolving to take on an increasingly pronounced anti-terrorist character.

In 1941, the laws established exceptional jurisdictions known as the sections spéciales, tasked with repressing any criminal offense committed with communist or anarchist intent. These particularly repressive courts, which operated retroactively and offered no possibility of appeal except for a pardon request to Philippe Pétain, drastically escalated the repression of targeted individuals. However, judicial defiance from magistrates who were opposed to these measures, or deemed too lenient by the authorities, prevented these initial steps from being fully enforced.

Consequently, Vichy steadily heightened the crackdown by introducing new laws to strengthen enforcement and repression. In 1943, a new law, the first French anti-terrorist law, introduced this specific terminology into its wording, further stripping away defense and appeal rights while categorizing anyone who aided a resistance fighter, communist, or anarchist as a criminal. Finally, in January 1944, a definitive law placed the entirety of this repression under the control of Joseph Darnand, Secretary-General for the Maintenance of Order and leader of the Milice, effectively abolishing the last remaining rights afforded to the accused.

== History ==
=== Context ===
During World War II, German troops crushed the French army and occupied the country. In parallel, the parliamentarians of the Third Republic granted full powers to Philippe Pétain to take charge of the dying Third Republic. This event gave rise to the Vichy regime, a collaborationist, far-right regime that ruled over the zone unoccupied by Nazi Germany, also known as the Zone libre.

This regime was viewed very unfavorably by communists and anarchists in France, who were deeply opposed to both the Nazis and Vichy. Many of them joined and organized resistance networks across the country, engaging in methods of sabotage or terrorism directed against the occupying or collaborationist forces.

Law of 14 August 1941: A highly repressive law modeled on previous anti-anarchist legislation

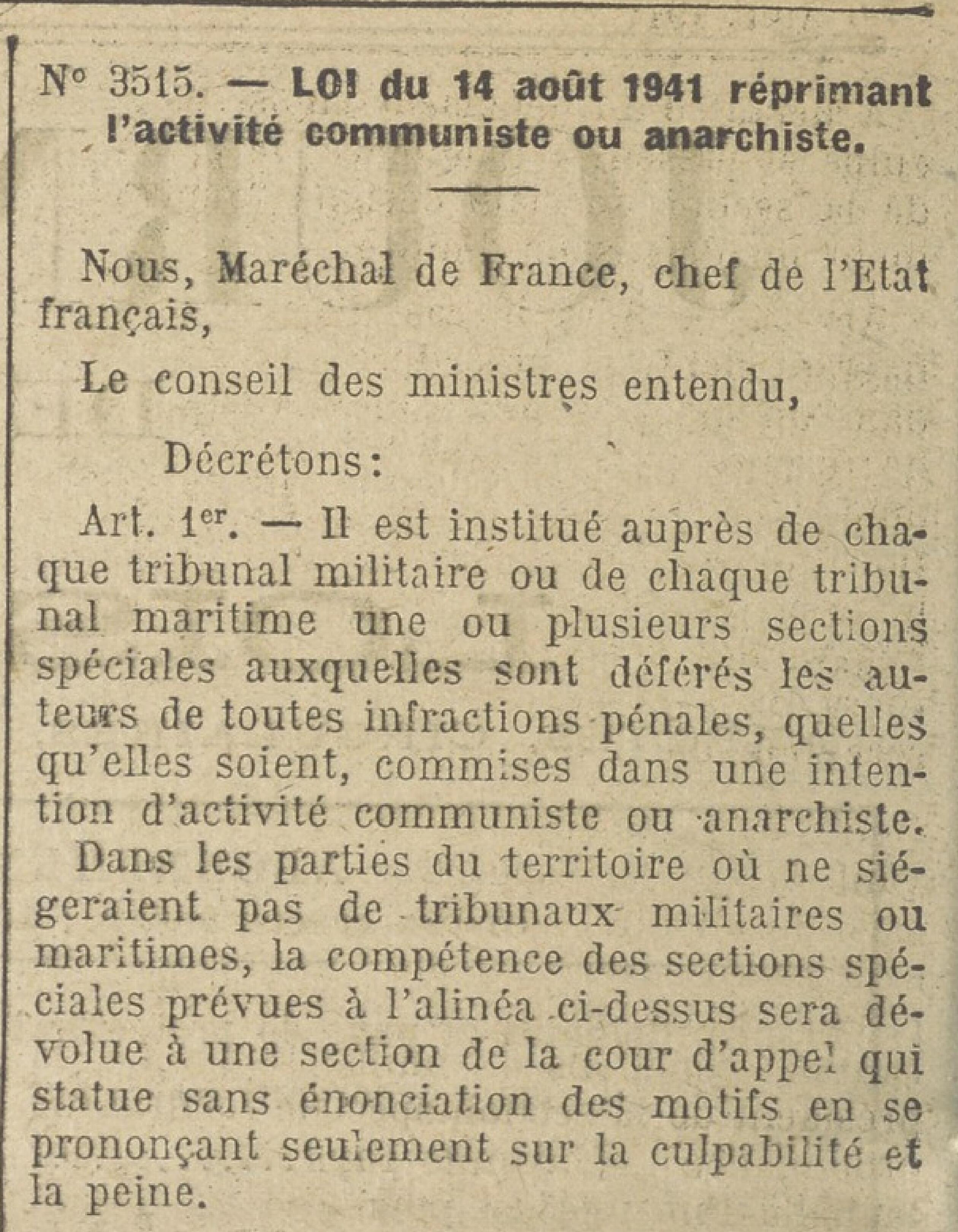
First article of the law of 14 August 1941

On 21 August 1941, following the launch of Operation Barbarossa and the summary execution of two communist militants in the Bois de Verrières, communist resistance fighter Pierre Georges, known as Colonel Fabien, shot and killed a German naval officer in the metro during the Barbès-Rochechouart attack.

This event triggered a sharp reaction from the authorities of the Vichy regime, who passed an initial law aimed at both communists and anarchists. The law was signed by Pétain and backdated to 14 August to create the impression that they were not merely reacting to the attack. This legislation followed the tradition of the lois scélérates ('villainous laws') that had targeted anarchists at the end of the 19th century, but it now extended its provisions to communists.

It established exceptional jurisdictions known as the special sections, which were tasked with judging 'the perpetrators of any criminal offenses whatsoever, committed with the intent of communist or anarchist activity'. In practice, this meant that, just as with previous anti-anarchist laws, guilt was now determined by the political opinion the perpetrator was presumed to hold while committing the act.

Furthermore, the law included multiple other highly authoritarian measures: it was retroactive, applying to actions committed up to ten years prior to its promulgation; suspended sentences could not be granted by the special sections; the courts had the right to impose the maximum penalty provided by law or even exceed it, including the death penalty, which was actively encouraged. Moreover, all avenues of appeal were abolished, and the accused could no longer appeal to any higher court, although they retained the practical right to petition Philippe Pétain for a pardon.

Judicial defiance and new laws

In the following months, a certain number of magistrates refused to sit on the special sections. Even some of those who did sit on them and had been handpicked, such as the judges of the special section of the Court of Appeal of Paris who tried the Barbès-Rochechouart attack, were reluctant to sentence the six defendants to death. This situation displeased the authorities, who established other exceptional jurisdictions, such as the Tribunal d'État in September 1941. According to historian Catherine Fillon, by leaving so little autonomy to magistrates in the enforcement of repression, the Pétainist government undermined its own cause and pushed them to engage in acts of judicial defiance.

Between the law of 14 August 1941 and that of 5 June 1943, Vichy adopted a series of intermediary laws which, broadly speaking, modified the 14 August law to guide it toward increasingly repressive directions.

Law of 5 June 1943: comprehensive overhaul of the 14 August 1941 law and the first French anti-terrorist law

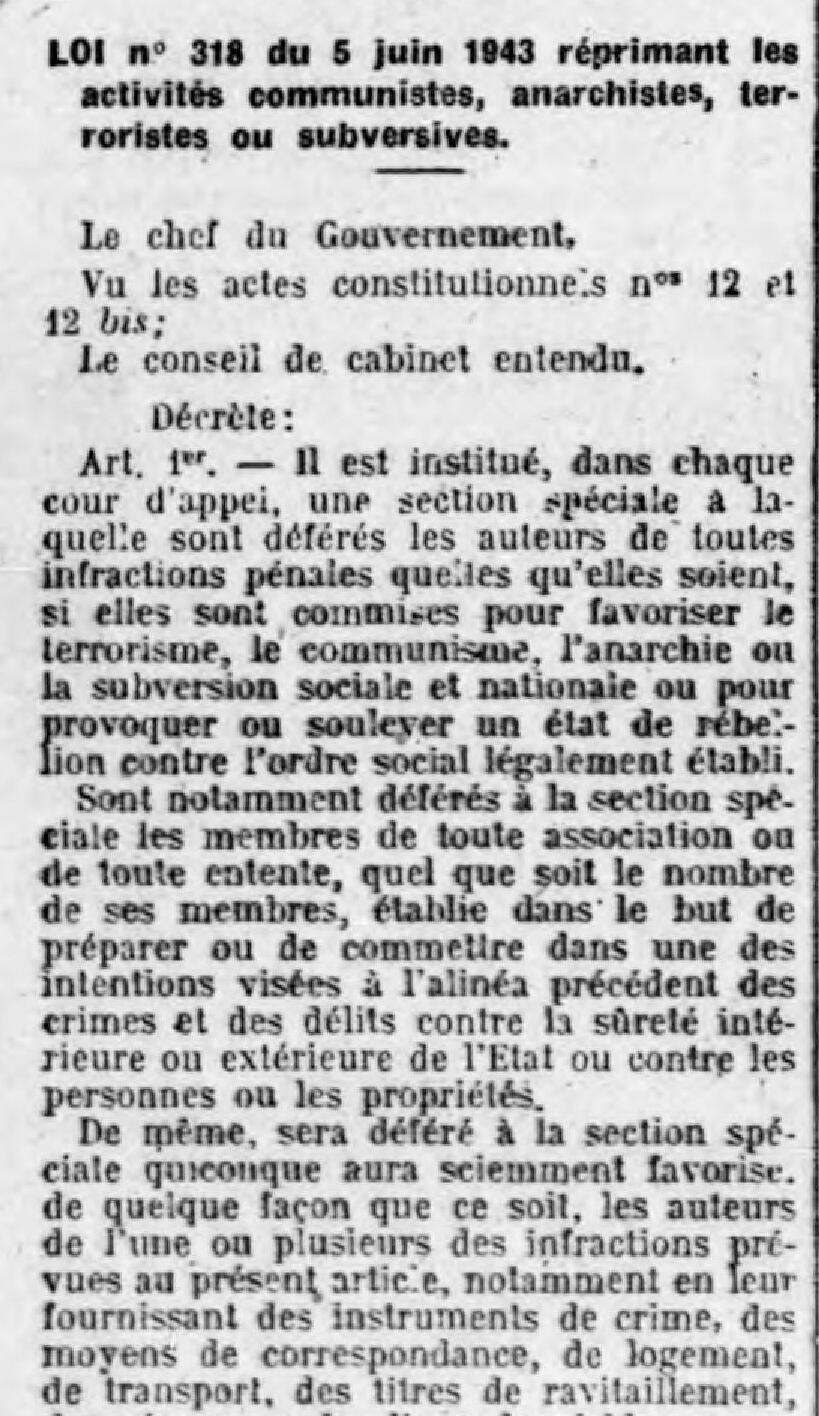
First article of the law of 5 June 1943

Despite the ongoing crackdown, the French Resistance grew in the following years, aided by the setbacks of the Axis troops. The Vichy regime, becoming ever more repressive and founding the Milice in January 1943, sought to strengthen the suppression, which it deemed insufficient under the law of 14 August 1941 and its multiple intermediary amendments.

This new law was primarily conceived by Maurice Gabolde, who decided to introduce the concept of terrorism, which he equated with anarchism and communism and utilized to target the French Resistance. While the 14 August law was still rooted in anti-socialist legislation, a lineage of laws tracing back to the lois scélérates and well-established in French law, this new terminology created a whole new category of legislation: anti-terrorist laws. The goal was to force magistrates to escalate repression by removing them from the framework of anti-socialist law, which Gabolde believed did not make them severe enough. Regarding this shift, historian Virginie Sansico writes:

The unprecedented use of such terminology undeniably marks a turning point: while the first version of the law on the special sections deliberately aligned itself with the traditional repression of "social infractions" well known to judges, Gabolde's intent this time was to introduce a fundamental rupture in meaning and compel magistrates to integrate new categorizations that were already omnipresent within the realm of propaganda.

This law was far more repressive than the first one, which was already particularly harsh. The Vichy state grew increasingly aware that French public opinion was turning against its existence, and consequently criminalized anyone who aided resistance fighters by offering them hospitality or food, classifying these categories of offenses or crimes alongside those committed by 'terrorists'.

Furthermore, the law expanded the jurisdiction of the special sections and heightened both penalties and enforcement; belonging to the resistance was elevated from a délit to a crime, and defense rights were once again severely curtailed.

New laws and continued repression

In July 1943, Vichy passed new laws, including one that allowed former police officers or gendarmes to be appointed to the special sections in order to increase penalties and heighten enforcement.

Despite the multiple legal developments forcing magistrates to apply exceptional laws and impose highly repressive sentences, a good number of them continued to hand down death sentences primarily in absentia, when the accused was not present. This practice allowed them to maintain a high statistic of death sentences on paper while avoiding their actual execution in reality. This cold calculation within the judiciary was not solely motivated by nobility of spirit, but also by the fact that as resistance fighters grew increasingly numerous, judges began to be targeted and assassinated. This pushed some of them to request firearms permits and placed them in an deeply ambiguous position.

In October, a new law allowed for the execution of those condemned to death by firing squad rather than by the guillotine, thereby framing the resistance fighters as external military enemies rather than French citizens.

Law of 20 January 1944: height of repression and the last major repressive law before the fall of Vichy

The law of 20 January 1944 reinforced the previously developed concept of resistance fighters, anarchists, and communists as external enemies. In this final piece of legislation, no mention was made of communism or anarchism at all; instead, the term terrorism completely replaced both concepts.

Most importantly, it placed the enforcement of repression into the hands of new courts, which were under the sole authority of Joseph Darnand, Secretary-General for the Maintenance of Order and leader of the Milice. All police forces across the country were also placed under his command, meaning that he held absolute control over the apparatus of repression. He chose both the judges and the outcomes of the trials.

These courts no longer offered any legal guarantees, and a resigning police official remarked at the time that a trial by court-martial would have afforded the defendants far more rights.

== Primary sources ==
- Law of 14 August 1941 repressing communist or anarchist activity by Philippe Pétain, Joseph Barthélemy, François Darlan, Pierre Pucheu, Charles Huntziger, and Jean Bergeret.
- Law No. 318 of 5 June 1943 repressing communist, anarchist, terrorist, or subversive activities by Pierre Laval, Maurice Gabolde, Eugène Bridoux, and Henri Bléhaut.

== Bibliography ==
- Duret, Jean (2022), "La répression judiciaire de l'activité et de la propagande communiste des années 1920 à la Libération : entre rupture et continuité de l'infraction politique en droit français" [Judicial repression of communist activity and propaganda from the 1920s to the Liberation: between rupture and continuity of the political offense in French law], Cahiers Jean Moulin (in French), Lyon
- Ferro, Marc (1987), Pétain, Paris: Fayard, ISBN 978-2-213-01833-1
- Sansico, Virginie (2016), "Le terrorisme, vie et mort d'une notion juridique (1930-1945)", Archives de Politique Criminelle [Terrorism, life and death of a legal concept (1930–1945)] (in French), Pédone, pp. 27–45, doi:10.3917/apc.038.0027, ISBN 9782233008084
