= Marguerite Vérine-Lebrun =

Marguerite Vérine-Lebrun (French: [veʁin ləbʁœ̃]; born Marguerite Marie Louise Lebrun; pen name: Vérine; 1883–1959) was a French activist and founder of the École des parents et des éducateurs.

== Biography ==
Lebrun was born on September 29, 1883, in Ivry-sur-Seine.

She was a right-wing activist and the founder of École des parents ("Parents School") in 1929, an education movement in France, and was "an outspoken supporter of traditional roles for women." As a journalist, she wrote under the pseudonym "Vérine". She wrote God, Work, Family, and Fatherland in 1941.

Lebrun was one of two women who served on the National Council of the Vichy government.

She died on September 7, 1959, in Paris.
