= Paul Baudouin =

French banker and politician

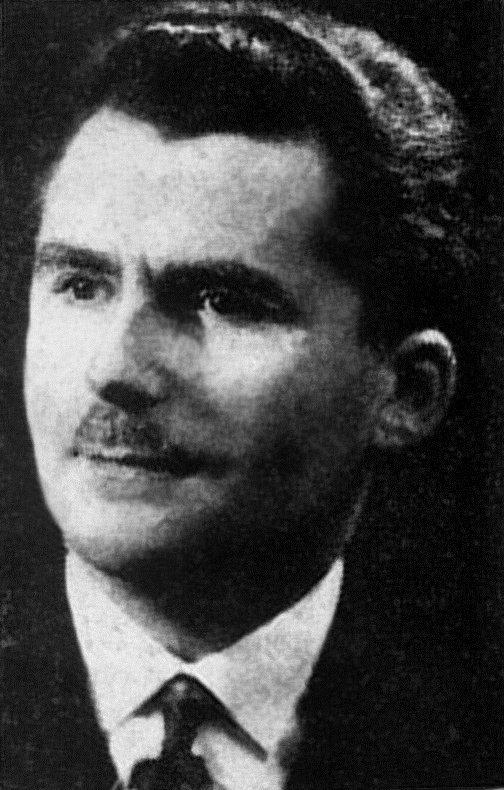
Paul Baudouin

Paul Baudouin (French pronunciation: [pɔl bodwɛ̃]; 19 December 1894 – 10 February 1964) was a French banker who became a politician and Foreign Minister of France for the last six months of 1940. He was instrumental in arranging a cessation of hostilities between France and Germany in June that year, resulting in an Armistice.

== Early years ==
Paul Baudouin was born into a wealthy family in Paris, and served as an artillery officer during The Great War in the French Army. In 1930 he became the Deputy Director and General Manager of the Banque de l'Indochine. A "convinced Catholic", like many Catholics of the time he considered himself "non-political" although he had been a committed member of the militant nationalist movement Action Française. He had also been a Catholic Scout leader in the years just prior to World War II, and had written a notable exhortation to young Christians for the Revue de jeunes. He called for "the renaissance, in the humbler form of a layman's Order, of the chivalry of old times" to defend the spiritual patrimony of the Christian West.

== Enters government ==
Following the fall of the troubled French Government of Édouard Daladier, on 20 March 1940, his Finance Minister Paul Reynaud was asked by President Albert Lebrun to form a new government, even though he only had a majority of one. Daladier remained as Minister of Defence. One of those civilian members appointed to the new Cabinet was Paul Baudouin, a known opponent of France's declaration of war against Germany, as Under-Secretary of State to the Prime Minister Soon, this young technocrat, attentive to the rising generation, would be the centre of a Catholic/Action Française cohort set on re-educating French young people, inspired by a host of new programs of Pétain's later Cabinet and entourage, drawing upon his Catholic scout or Revue des jeunes contacts.

== Invasion crisis ==
The German Army invaded France on 10 May 1940 and Baudouin was present at the French Cabinet conference with Churchill on the night of 16 May when Churchill was told of the hopelessness of the French military situation. On the 18th a cabinet reshuffle took place and Marshal Philippe Pétain was invited by Paul Reynaud to become Deputy Premier of France. Baudouin was present on the morning of 24 May when General Weygand reported to Reynaud and Pétain that "the situation is very grave". On 26 May Weygand told Baudouin that he "wished to avoid internal troubles, and above all anarchy". On the same day, Pétain came to see Baudouin and said, "I cannot allow the errors of the politicians to be blamed on the army", and blamed Daladier and the 'Front Populaire'. Baudouin reported this conversation to Reynaud the following day. That night, the King of Belgium announced the capitulation of the Belgian army.

The military situation now drastically deteriorated: on 5 June, Dunkirk fell, and Reynaud again reshuffled his Cabinet, sacking Daladier, and giving Paul Baudouin another appointment as Under-Secretary of State for Foreign Affairs. General Charles de Gaulle was appointed Under-Secretary of State for War. Pétain, furious at de Gaulle's appointment, complained to Baudouin and asked him to use his influence with the prime minister to prevent de Gaulle attending the morning meetings, describing de Gaulle as "proud, ungrateful and embittered." Baudouin suggested he should see Reynaud himself. On 8 June, Baudouin dined with Camille Chautemps and both agreed that the war must end. On 10 June, the government left Paris for Tours. Maxime Weygand, the Commander-in-Chief, now declared that "the fighting had become meaningless" and he told Baudouin and several members of the government that he thought an armistice was essential; Baudouin agreed.

On 11 June, Churchill flew to the Chateau du Muguet, at Briare, near Orléans, where he put forward first his idea of a Breton redoubt, to which Weygand replied that it was "just a fantasy". The following day, the cabinet met, and Weygand again called for an armistice. He referred to the danger of military and civil disorder and the possibility of a Communist uprising in Paris. Pétain and Minister of Information Jean Prouvost urged the Cabinet to hear Weygand out because "he was the only one really to know what was happening". Churchill returned on the 13th. Baudouin met his plane and immediately spoke to him of the hopelessness of the French army's resistance.

== Armistice ==
Baudouin was appointed Minister of Foreign Affairs on 16 June 1940 in Pétain's new Cabinet, and the following day he requested the Spanish Ambassador "to transmit to Germany with all speed the request to cease hostilities at once and at the same time to make known the peace terms proposed by them". On the morning of 19 June José Félix de Lequerica y Erquiza, the Spanish Foreign Minister, reported to Baudouin that the Germans were prepared to talk. The following day, he was further advised that the Germans were prepared to meet the French plenipotentiaries later that day at Tours. The armistice negotiations were led on the French side by General Charles Huntziger. Baudouin was present at the Council of Ministers, which met during the night of 21 June in Bordeaux to consider the terms. The Armistice was agreed, to come into effect at 12:35 on the morning of 25 June.

== Vichy ==
The government subsequently moved from Bordeaux to Clermont-Ferrand, and then, at Baudouin's suggestion, to Vichy, considered to be a perfect place for the administration. On 30 June Pierre Laval suggested to Pétain, Baudouin and Raphael Alibert that the Senate and the Chamber of Deputies should be called together in joint session to consider new constitutional changes. Baudouin was against the proposal, on the grounds that "you do not change the constitution of a country whose capital is in enemy hands". At this point Pétain sided with Baudouin. However, both would change their mind when they heard that President Albert Lebrun was in favour. In the event the Chamber of Deputies carried the proposal by 395 votes to 3, and when both Houses finally voted in joint session it was carried by 569 to 80 (Communist Deputies were not permitted to vote). On 13 July Pétain appointed a new group of twelve ministers as his Council of Ministers and Baudouin continued as Minister of Foreign Affairs. The Cabinet would now meet twice or three times a week. In addition there was an inner circle (Laval, Baudouin, Yves Bouthillier, Admiral Jean Darlan, and General Weygand) which met every day. The following day Pétain discussed in private with Baudouin that he was concerned about the succession should he (Pétain) die, and advised a surprised Baudouin that whilst he was Pétain's choice, his successor should be chosen by the Council of Ministers.

In the summer of 1940 Baudouin gave his backing to Henri Dhavernas, Inspecteur des Finances, and a former chief commissioner for the Catholic Scouts de France, to found a new official youth movement, the 'Compagnons de France', which was formally registered as an association in July 1940. It was, following the armistice, both a pragmatic way to unify French young people and a reflection of the romantic, anti-liberal, anti-modern mentality of many pre-war Catholic intellectuals. The Compagnons, Maréchal Pétain said, were to be "the National Revolution's vanguard". The movement received the enormous sum of 19 million Francs in subsidies, in addition to an initial sum of 6.1 million Francs handed over personally to Dhavernas by Baudouin, between October 1940 and January 1941.

It appears that Baudouin was also a monarchist at heart, as on the 8 October Abetz, the German Ambassador in Paris, wrote to von Ribbentrop that "some (French) ministers, such as Alibert, Baudouin and Bouthillier, are hoping for an eventual restoration of the Bourbons". About this time Pierre Laval, with Pétain's approval, took over most of Baudouin's powers as Foreign Minister. Intrigues followed, and by mid-November Baudouin, Yves Bouthillier, Marcel Peyrouton, (Minister of the Interior), Raphael Alibert, Admiral Darlan and General Huntziger were putting pressure upon Pétain to have Laval dismissed from office. They succeeded in this the following month, in which Baudouin also served briefly as Minister of Information. He resigned from the government of his own accord on 2 January 1941.

== After government ==
Between 1941 and 1944 he returned to the bank of Indo-China, serving as Chairman. However, after the war he was charged with collaborating with the Germans, and on 3 March 1947 he was sentenced to five years hard labour. The sentence was commuted in 1949.

== Notes ==
Political offices
Preceded by —	Under-Secretary of State to the Prime Minister (France); 1940	Succeeded by —
Preceded by Paul Reynaud	Minister of Foreign Affairs; 1940	Succeeded by Pierre Laval
Preceded by —	Minister of Information; December 1940	Succeeded by Henri Moysset
