= Henry Lémery =

French politician and lawyer (1874–1972)

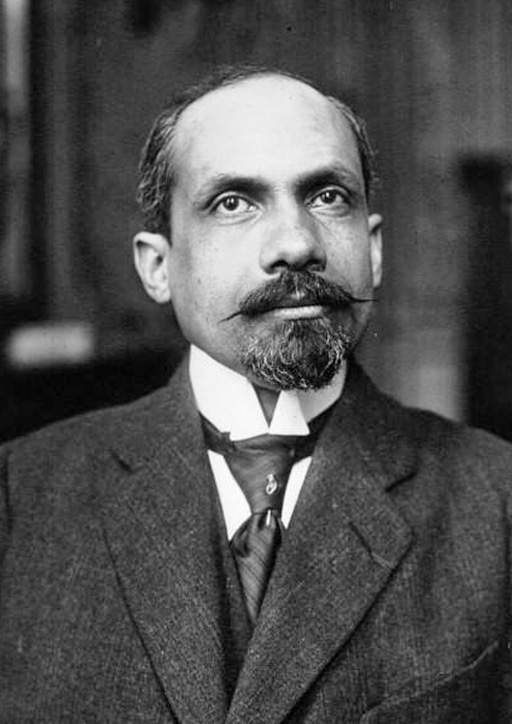
- Lémery in 1918

Minister of Justice
- In office 15 October 1934 – 8 November 1934
- Prime Minister: Gaston Doumergue
- Preceded by: Henry Chéron
- Succeeded by: Georges Pernot

Colonial Secretary
- In office 12 July 1940 – 6 September 1940
- Preceded by: Albert Rivière
- Succeeded by: Charles Platon

Personal details
- Born: 9 December 1874 Saint-Pierre, Martinique
- Died: 26 April 1972 (aged 97) Paris, France
- Occupation: Lawyer

Henry Lémery (9 December 1874 – 26 April 1972) was a politician from Martinique who served in the French National Assembly from 1914–1919 and the French Senate from 1920–1941. Lémery was briefly Minister of Justice in 1934. During World War II (1939–45) he was Colonial Secretary in the Vichy government for three months in 1940 before being dismissed.

== Life ==
=== Early years ===
Henry Lémery was born on 9 December 1874 in Saint-Pierre, Martinique. His family had been settled in the Antillean island of Martinique since the mid-17th century. He was a mulatto but was very light-skinned. (Note: Lémery was occasionally called "black", despite his very light skin. The closest he came to mentioning his ethnic background was to once mention his origines coloniales (colonial origins), while he denigrated Governor Félix Éboué of Chad as "le gouverneur noir Eboué" (the black governor Eboué).) He was educated at the secondary school (lycée) in Saint-Pierre, then in Paris at the Lycée Louis-le-Grand. After rejecting a career as a teacher, he enrolled at the Sorbonne and then at the Faculty of Law of the University of Paris. Lémery became a lawyer in 1898 and joined the bar of Paris in 1899. In May 1902 his whole family died during the eruption of Mount Pelée. He twice married French women.

In 1902 Lémery entered the office of Ernest Vallé, the Minister of Justice, as deputy to Henry de Jouvenel. He joined the French Section of the Workers' International in 1906 and ran unsuccessfully for Deputy of Martinique that year. He again failed to be elected in 1909 for the 12th arrondissement of Paris. In January 1914 he was elected deputy for Martinique.

=== World War I ===
During World War I (1914–18) Lémery was exempt from military service as a colonial, but enlisted as a private soldier. He served in Champagne, Verdun and the Somme, was promoted to officer and was awarded the Cross of the Legion of Honour and the Croix de Guerre. He returned to the Chamber of Deputies in 1917, where he was vocal on subjects related to the war. He was offered but refused the portfolio of Minister of War for the Army by Paul Painlevé, whom he had criticized harshly. On 16 November 1917 he accepted the position of Minister of State for Maritime Transport and the Merchant Marine in the second cabinet of Georges Clemenceau. He resigned on 28 November 1918 on the basis that his job was done.

=== Inter-war period ===
On 18 January 1920 Lémery was elected Senator of Martinique in place of Amédée Knight, who had died. He was defeated in the election of 6 January 1924, but returned to the senate after his opponent's election was invalidated. Lémery spoke in favor of making the colonies of Martinique and Guadeloupe departments of France, saying they had been part of the French Empire for so long that they were more French than France itself. The senate voted for the change, then backed off and dropped it. He was reelected on 10 January 1933. He was a member of the Democratic, Radical and Radical Socialist Left. He was involved in a broad range of issues, and sat on many committees. He was briefly Minister of Justice in the second cabinet of Gaston Doumergue, from 15 October 1934 until the government fell on 8 November 1934.

Lémery became a tireless critic of foreign policy, where he felt that France was weak and inconsistent, and supported Western European unity and the League of Nations. He approved the policy of non-intervention during the Spanish Civil War (1936–39). He interviewed General Francisco Franco in April 1938, who told him, "Nationalist Spain has made no appeal to any power. It was only when the Russian tanks made their appearance in Madrid [...] that the Generalissimo of the Nationalist forces decided to allow foreign volunteers to enlist." Lémery became a moderate conservative and a close friend of Marshal Philippe Pétain and did much to promote Pétain's reputation during the 1930s. Lémery approved the Munich Agreement.

=== World War II ===
World War II (1939–45) began in September 1939, but there was a considerable delay before Germany attacked France, a period called the Guerre d'attente (The Waiting War - known as the Phoney War in English). In his memoirs Lémery wrote that a month after the war had begun he visited Marshal Pétain in Spain and tried to persuade him to form a new government. Pétain said he was willing to take charge of the armed forces but was not qualified to lead a government, and would not know who to appoint to his cabinet. Lémery said he could find reliable men such as Pierre Laval, Raphaël Alibert and Adrien Marquet. Although Pétain continued to object, Lémery thought that in the end he would agree, and after returning to Paris continued to work towards arranging a potential cabinet for a Pétain government. A list of ministers was ready by 9 October 1939.

On 16 November 1939 Lémery wrote in Paris-Soir that Germany would be slowly strangled if she waited, but would be overwhelmingly defeated if she attacked. On 10 May 1940 Germany launched an invasion of the Netherlands, Belgium and Luxembourg, and ten days later reached the English Channel at Abbeville. The German army broke through the Somme/Aisne line on 5–7 June 1940. Prime Minister Paul Reynaud resigned on 16 June 1940 and Pétain was asked to form a new government. The armistice between France and Germany was signed on 22 June 1940. On 10 July 1940 in Vichy Lémery voted for granting Pétain the increased powers that he was seeking.

Lémery was appointed Colonial Secretary in Pétain's government on 12 July 1940. As the historian Richard Vinen has observed, "the appointment of a black man to the government, even for so short a period, revealed some of the ways in which Vichy different from Nazi Germany", notably in relation to Nazi racial ideology. Lémery did what he could to prevent the Gaullists from taking over the French colonial empire, and transmitted Pétainist messages that called for respect for authority and for the people to leave the cities and "return to the soil". On 15 July 1940 he sent a call for unity to all "loyal" colonial governors. On 16 August 1940 he wrote to the governor of Senegal, "I ask you to ensure that in Dakar a strong discipline and rigorous order be maintained, as well as a respect of leaders. You are to prevent the all too frequent and unnecessary desertion of the village, undertaken out of a desire to escape obligations. The net effect has been the swelling of urban centers." His influence in the French West Indies is indicated by a comment by the American vice consul there, who said in August,

The inhabitants of these colonies are divided on the question [of loyalty], many thinking that the colonies should have declared for General de Gaulle. ... However it is noticeable that much of the local public talk against the Pétain government has ceased since the receipt of a telegram from Monsieur Henri Lémery, Senator from Martinique and now Minister of the Colonies, requesting that the people support the present regime in France.

Lémery extended the laws of 18–19 August 1940 to the colonies, prohibiting "extraordinary sessions" of elected councils and banning secret societies (eg. freemasons, of whom the Vichy regime disapproved). He was dismissed on 6 September 1940 during a cabinet reshuffle, and was succeeded by Rear-Admiral Charles Platon. Lémery later claimed, presumably correctly, that he had been dismissed due to German pressure because of his "colonial origins". That is, for racist reasons. His mandate as Senator expired on 31 December 1941. Lémery sent a letter to Pierre Laval on 28 August 1942 in which he proposed to introduce the Conseil Local to the Antilles, and to make Guadeloupe and Martinique French départements. By doing so the islanders would be assured that the government intended to preserve their status as anciennes colonies.

=== Last years ===
After the war Lémery was sentenced to five years of "national indignity" for his support of the Vichy regime. He was tried by the High Court and was acquitted in 1947. In 1964 he published D'Une République 'a l'Autre: Souvenirs de la Mêlée Politique 1894-1944 in which he defended his political career. A reviewer wrote, "To those who are still interested in the war-time political divisions, this personal account may have some nostalgic appeal, for it does evoke certain authentic attitudes of the Third Republic." In 1965 he was accused of insulting the Head of State (General de Gaulle, who had returned to power in 1958) in this book, and defended himself in court at the age of 90. Henry Lémery died in the 7th arrondissement of Paris on 26 April 1972 at the age of 97.

== Publications ==
- Lémery, Henry (1926). Pour le redressement financier et la stabilisation du franc: Discours... Séance du Sénat du mercredi 24 février 1926. Imp. des Journaux officiels. p. 12.
- Lémery, Henry (1924). Discussion des interpellations sur les accords de Londres et la politique extérieure de la France: Discours... 1re séance du Sénat du 26 août 1924. imp. des Journaux officiels. p. 14.
- Lémery, Henry (1931). De la guerre totale à la paix mutilés. Alcan. p. 365. (Collection of political speeches)
- Lémery, Henry (1936). La Révolution française à la Martinique. Larose. p. 338. (The French Revolution in Martinique)
- Lémery, Henry (1937). La justice du "Frente Popular" en Espagne. Les Éditions de France. p. 55.
- Lémery, Henry; Duval, Maurice; Jouart, Louis André; Joubert, Henri (1938). La tragédie espagnole: conférence donnée au théatre des Ambassadeurs le mercredi 27 avril 1938. A.C.I.P. p. 47.
- Lémery, Henry (1938). La Russie et la France. Société des amis de la Russie nationale. p. 18.
- Goulévitch, Arsène de; Lémery, Henry (1940). L' heure de la Russie Nationale. Société des amis de la Russie nationale. p. 38.
- Lémery, Henry (1949). De la paix de Briand à la guerre de Hitler. Ligneau.
- Lémery, Henry (1962). Martinique, terre française. Le conflit des races et l'opinion métropolitaine. Maisonneuve & Larose. p. 145.
- Lémery, Henry (1964). D'une république à l'autre: souvenirs de la mêlée politique 1894-1944. Table ronde. p. 339.

== Sources ==
- Jackson, Julian (27 March 2003). The Fall of France : The Nazi Invasion of 1940: The Nazi Invasion of 1940. Oxford University Press, USA. p. 138. ISBN 978-0-19-151663-4.
- Jennings, Eric T. (1 January 2004). Vichy in the Tropics: Petain's National Revolution in Madagascar, Guadeloupe, and Indochina, 1940-44. Stanford University Press. ISBN 978-0-8047-5047-9.
- Jolly, Jean (1977). "Henry LÉMERY". Dictionnaire des parlementaires français de 1889 à 1940 (in French).
- La documentation française (2005). "Henry LÉMERY". Dictionnaire des parlementaires français de 1940 à 1958 (in French). Vol. 5.
- "LEMERY Henry". Senate of France.
- McCloy, Shelby T. (5 February 2015). The Negro in France. University Press of Kentucky. ISBN 978-0-8131-6398-7.
- Pickles, Dorothy (October 1966). "Review: D'Une République 'a l'Autre". International Affairs. 42 (4). Wiley on behalf of the Royal Institute of International Affairs. JSTOR 2610196.
- Pike, David Wingeate (July 1982). "Franco and the Axis Stigma". Journal of Contemporary History. 17 (3). Sage Publications: 369–407. doi:10.1177/002200948201700301. JSTOR 260553. S2CID 159511076.
- Serrano, Richard (24 November 2006). Against the Postcolonial: Francophone Writers at the Ends of the French Empire. Lexington Books. ISBN 978-0-7391-2029-3.
- Shamir, Haim (January 1976). "The drole de guerre and French Public Opinion". Journal of Contemporary History. 11 (1). Sage Publications, Ltd.: 129–143. doi:10.1177/002200947601100106. JSTOR 260006. S2CID 96517348.
- Szaluta, Jacques (Autumn 1974). "Marshal Petain's Ambassadorship to Spain: Conspiratorial or Providential Rise toward Power?". French Historical Studies. 8 (4). Duke University Press: 511–533. doi:10.2307/285851. JSTOR 285851.
