= Charles Platon =

French politician (1886–1944)

Rear Admiral René-Charles Platon
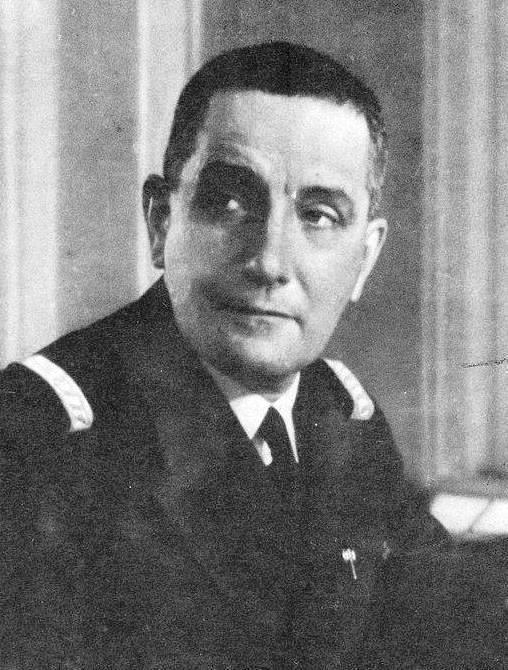
- Platon in 1942

Secretary of State for the Colonies
- In office 6 September 1940 – 18 April 1942
- Preceded by: Henry Lémery
- Succeeded by: Jules Brévié

Personal details
- Born: 19 September 1886 Pujols, Gironde, France
- Died: 28 August 1944 (aged 57) Valojoulx, Dordogne, France
- Cause of death: Execution by firing squad

René-Charles Platon (French pronunciation: [ʁəne ʃaʁl platɔ̃]; 19 September 1886 – 28 August 1944) was a French admiral who was responsible for the Colonial Ministry under the Vichy government. He was a passionate supporter of the Révolution nationale (National Revolution) of Vichy France, which he wanted to export to the colonies. He was hostile to elected bodies, anti–Semitic, anti-Masonic, and supported the back-to-the-soil movement. He saw Britain as the enemy of France. After the Allied invasion of Normandy, he was captured by French partisans in the summer of 1944, given a summary trial, and executed.

== Early years (1886–1918) ==
Charles Platon was born in Pujols-sur-Dordogne, Gironde, on 19 September 1886. His father was a librarian at the Bordeaux Faculty of Law, and his mother was a professor at the Normal School. Platon was admitted to the Naval School at the age of 18, where he did well. He became a midshipman on 5 October 1907 in the port of Toulon. On 1 January 1908 he was assigned to the battle cruiser Léon-Gambetta. He was again posted to the port of Toulon on 1 January 1909. On 5 October 1909 he was promoted to Ensign. He was appointed to the battle cruiser Victor-Hugo on 1 January 1911.

On 1 January 1912 Platon entered the School of Destroyer Officers in Toulon. He was made an officer, and on 1 January 1914 was made second in command of the submarine Germinal based in Cherbourg. Platon was promoted to Lieutenant on 17 March 1917. In October 1917 he was given command of the submarine Opale in the Mediterranean. He was made a Knight of the Legion of Honour.

== Inter-war period (1918–1939) ==
On 1 January 1921 Platon was given command of the submarine Fulton, based at Toulon. He graduated from the École Supérieure de la Marine (Higher Naval School) in 1922. He was promoted to Lieutenant Commander on 14 June 1923, and Commander on 11 January 1927. He was made an Officer of the Legion of Honor. On 22 February 1929 he was given command of the destroyer Tornado. On 1 January 1932 he was assigned to the port of Toulon. On 1 November 1935 he was promoted to captain in command of the destroyer Le Fantasque.

== World War II (1939–1944) ==
=== Dunkirk and aftermath ===
In October 1939 Platon was promoted to rear admiral in command of the group at Dunkerque-Calais-Boulogne. The Germans launched their invasion on 10 May 1940. In June 1940 Platon helped the British command in the evacuation of the port of Dunkirk. Platon was known to use cocaine. After the escape of the British from Dunkirk his Anglophobia reached a hysterical pitch. Platon, who was still enraged at Britain over Dunkirk, visited Cameroon on 20–22 July 1940 and stirred up trouble between the sides that supported and opposed the British. Soon after the British were informed that their planes were not to fly over Cameroon. However, a month later Cameroon swung over to the Gaullist side.

=== Colonial secretary ===
The Colonial Secretary Henry Lémery was dismissed on 6 September 1940 during a cabinet reshuffle, and was succeeded by Platon. Platon was recommended by Fleet Admiral François Darlan, and Marshal Philippe Pétain soon came to respect him. According to the historian Eric T. Jennings, Platon was "fanatically Vichyite and rabidly Anglophobe". He was close to Charles Maurras, whom he often asked for advice on colonial matters. A violent opponent of General Charles de Gaulle, he described the Free French as "a bunch of renegades made up of volunteers of the Universal Jewish Empire." Platon wanted the colonies to be part of the National Revolution. Platon ensured that most of the antisemitic and anti-Masonic laws of Vichy France were implemented in the colonies. He also exported the Vichy regimentation of young people, cult of the soil, cult of the leader and hatred of parliamentary government. However, Platon was concerned that the colonies might adapt the ideas of the National Revolution to their own national rebirth and independence, which he strongly opposed.

On 27 October 1940, on Platon's recommendation, a law was passed that suspended all elected assemblies in the colonies, and that gave the colonial governors full powers. In June 1941 Platon proposed a number of ways to eliminate obstacles to implementing the French antisemitic laws in the colonies. In response to a suggestion that the Indochinese be allowed to fill high-level administrative positions he wrote on 20 October 1941, "[A]dmitting non-French citizens to management positions poses delicate questions, and simply cannot be undertaken." Platon was suspicious of Protestant missions in French West Africa due to their links with the Anglican missions in neighboring British colonies. He said the missions must limit themselves to religion and stay loyal to France, and told the colonial administrators to closely monitor missions that had ties to the British.

In December 1941 Platon presented a ten-year plan in which he declared that France would continue her colonizing mission. He said the colonies should be industrialized. The war had shown that decentralization of vital industries was prudent. This would not weaken industry in metropolitan France, but would give colonial subjects greater buying power. The main goal was to improve agriculture, roads and transportation so as to develop exports. Development of industry was secondary. Development of primary industries such as energy and building materials would ensure a basic level of economic autonomy, and in some cases more advanced industries could be introduced, while avoiding any revolutionary change. Platon was Colonial Secretary until 18 April 1942, when he was succeeded by Jules Brévié. This coincided with Pierre Laval's return to office as Prime Minister.

=== Later career ===
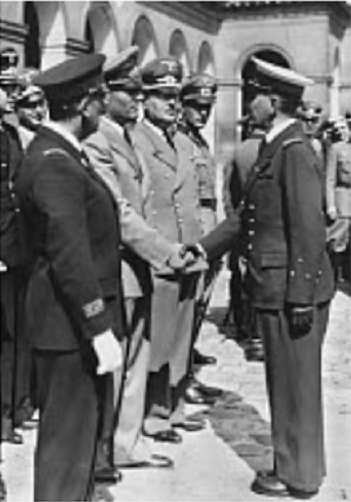
Charles Platon greeting German ambassador Otto Abetz on the occasion of the Day of the Tricolor Legion 29 August 1942

Under Laval Platon was made responsible for anti-Masonic activities. The French authorities had created the anti-masonic Service des sociétés secrètes (SSS) in May 1941. Platon was made chief of this service. Platon ordered the expulsion of some categories of Jews from the Clermont-Ferrand region, which started in late June 1942, to make housing available for government employees. In September 1942 Platon was informed that about 70% of the Jews whose cases had been examined had been expelled. In August and September 1942 Platon blamed the defeat of France by Germany on the absence of discipline, the love of pleasure and the destruction of the family. He also blamed secret societies, Freemasons, Jews and trusts. To restore the grandeur of France he called for obedience and order, total loyalty to the leader, courage, patience, honesty and discipline. On 1 November 1943 Platon, as head of the SSS, reported that,

The forces of order are unreliable, important, mired in an incapacity to act by regulations made for happier times when it was enough to show force in order not to have to use it ... the consequence is that the only notable security operations in France that have been effective up to now were carried out either by French irregular forces unknown to, or not recognized by, the French government, or by the German authorities.

Platon believed that England was the enemy, and was furious at the scuttling of the French fleet in Toulon on 27 November 1942. Darlan reprimanded him for displaying a large signed portrait of Maurras in his cabin. Laval forced Platon to retire to Pujols on 26 March 1943. He was arrested at his home by the Francs-Tireurs et Partisans on 22 July 1944, and after a summary trial was found guilty of giving intelligence to the enemy. He was executed by a firing squad on 28 August 1944; proud and arrogant, he himself gave the order to shoot.

=== Personal life ===
In 1911 Platon married Suzanne Bellamy. They had four children.

== Sources ==
- Callil, Carmen (2008-12-10). Bad Faith: A Forgotten History of Family, Fatherland and Vichy France. Knopf Doubleday Publishing Group. ISBN 978-0-307-48188-7.
- "Charles Platon (1886–1944)". BnF (in French).
- Ginio, Ruth (2006-12-01). French Colonialism Unmasked: The Vichy Years in French West Africa. U of Nebraska Press. ISBN 0-8032-5380-X.
- Jennings, Eric T. (2004-01-01). Vichy in the Tropics: Petain's National Revolution in Madagascar, Guadeloupe, and Indochina, 1940-44. Stanford University Press. ISBN 978-0-8047-5047-9.
- Jennings, Eric T. (2015-07-08). French Africa in World War II. Cambridge University Press. ISBN 978-1-107-04848-5.
- Jogerst, Gilles (2015). "Charles Jean Guillaume PLATON". Espace Traditions / Ecole Navale.
- Larronde, Claude (2015). "Platon, le soldat perdu" (in French).
- Pettibone, Charles D. (2010). The Organization and Order of Battle of Militaries in World War II. Trafford Publishing. ISBN 978-1-4269-4633-2.
- Poussou, Jean-Pierre; Chaline, Olivier; Bouëdec, Gérard Le (2011-12-08). Marine, Etat et politique (in French). Presses Paris Sorbonne. ISBN 978-2-84050-802-1.
- Roodenburg, Herman (2004). Social Control in Europe: 1800-2000. Ohio State University Press. ISBN 978-0-8142-0969-1.
- Sweets, John (1986-03-13). Choices in Vichy France: The French Under Nazi Occupation. Oxford University Press, USA. ISBN 978-0-19-991040-3.
