= Maurice Gabolde =

French jurist and politician

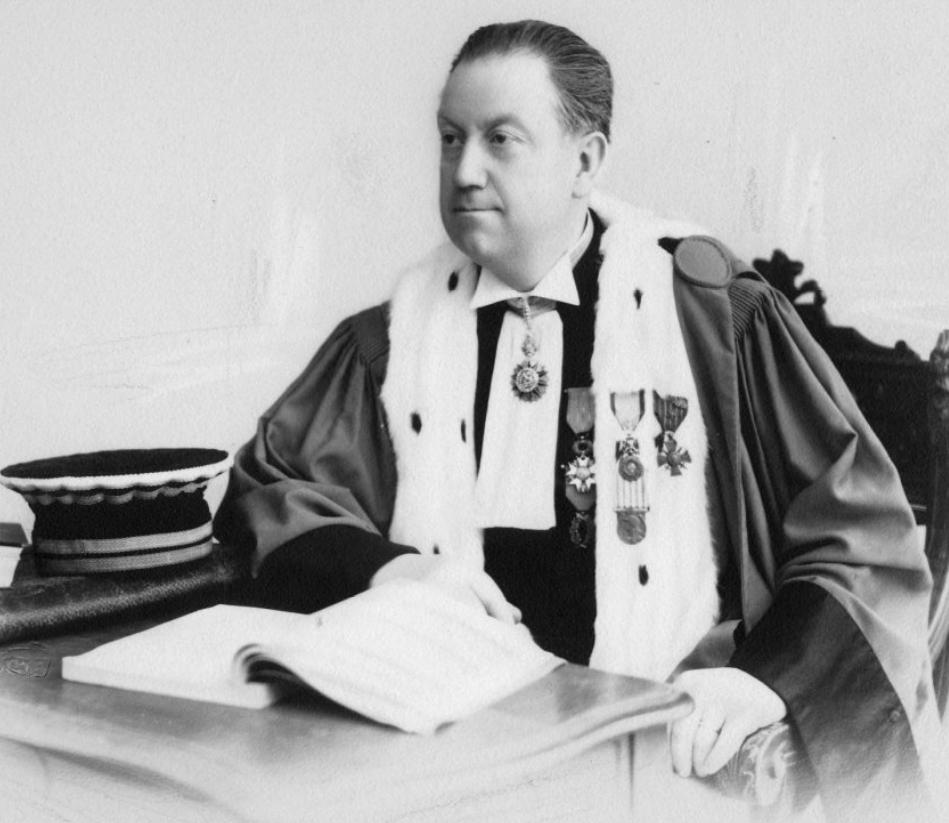
- Maurice Gabolde

Minister of Justice of Vichy France
- In office 1943–1944
- Preceded by: Joseph Barthélemy
- Succeeded by: René Cassin

Personal details
- Born: 27 August 1891 Castres, France
- Died: 14 January 1972 (aged 80) Barcelona, Spain

Maurice Gabolde (27 August 1891, Castres – 14 January 1972, Barcelona) was a French jurist and politician. During World War II, he served as minister of Justice in the Vichy regime.

After the War he was sentenced to death by France for collaborationism; but had already escaped from the Sigmaringen enclave to Spain before the fall of the Vichy government in exile.

Political offices
Preceded by Joseph Barthélemy	Minister of Justice; 1943–1944	Succeeded by René Cassin
