= Bertrand Pujo =

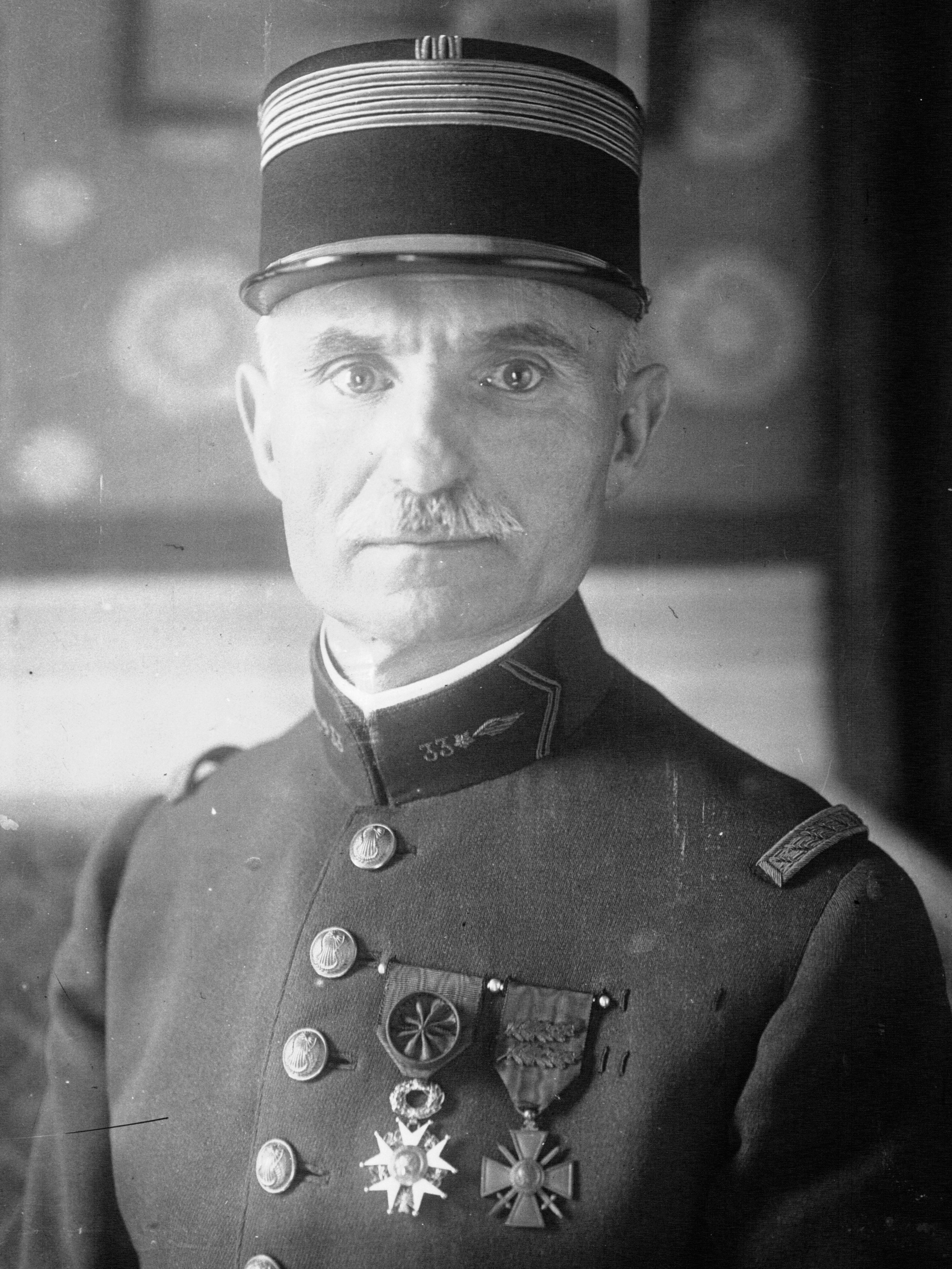
- Pujo in 1926, as a colonel.
- Born: 26 August 1878; Orignac, Hautes-Pyrénées
- Died: 14 September 1964 (aged 86); 17th arrondissement of Paris
- Military career
- Allegiance: France
- Branch: French Air Force
- Service years: 1897–1936
- Rank: Air Army General
- Awards: Grand Cross of the Legion of Honour

Bertrand Bernard Léon Pujo, born on 26 August 1878 in Orignac, Hautes-Pyrénées, and died on 14 September 1964 in Paris, was a French military officer, briefly Minister of Air in 1940, and President of Air France.

== Biography ==
Bertrand Pujo completed his secondary education at the Tarbes lycée. Accepted to the Special Military School of Saint-Cyr, he joined the school on 26 October 1897.

Graduating as a second lieutenant in 1899, he chose the French Foreign Legion and was assigned to the 21st Company of the 2nd RE. In August 1900, he embarked with the 6/2nd RE for Haiphong. His unit was deployed in the Yên Bái region as part of the 2nd RE Marching Regiment. He participated in the China campaign with the 14th Company. Promoted to lieutenant on 1 October 1901, he returned to France at the end of his tour in October 1902. After a year at Saïda in the 17th Company of the 5th Battalion of the 2nd RE, he returned to Tonkin with the 5/2nd RE. He was stationed in Yen Luong, Viétri, and Phu Doan. Later, he joined the 1st RE during a reorganization of the Legion's units in Tonkin.

Repatriated to Algeria in 1907, he was stationed in Sidi Bel Abbès. After being admitted to the École supérieure de guerre, he graduated as a staff officer. Promoted to captain on 24 September 1912, he was assigned to the 18th Army Corps staff and earned his observer pilot's certification. On 1 January 1914, he was named a Knight of the Legion of Honour.

From July 1914, he became exclusively an aviator, performing numerous observation missions over enemy-occupied territory. He received two citations at the army level. Promoted to major on 1 October 1916, he was appointed deputy chief of aviation at the Grand Headquarters. In 1919, he joined the War Ministry under General Henri Mordacq. Promoted to lieutenant colonel and awarded the Officer's Cross of the Legion of Honour on 16 June 1920, he became a colonel in December 1921, commanding the 35th Aviation Regiment on 8 April 1922. He earned his pilot's certification on 24 June 1922.

In September 1926, he was promoted to the first section of general officers and awarded the commander of the Legion of Honour in 1928. Promoted to major general in January 1930, he joined the Superior Council of the Air. By December 1935, he was named Chief of Staff of the French Air Force and vice president of the Superior Air Council.

He retired from active service on 14 October 1936 to take over the presidency of Air France. In 1938, he was awarded the dignity of Grand Cross of the Legion of Honour.

Elevated to the rank and title of air army general on 2 September 1939, he was appointed minister of air by Marshal Pétain, serving from 16 June to 12 July 1940 in the last cabinet of the French Third Republic. From 12 July to 5 September 1940, he served as secretary of state for aviation. He then resumed his role as president of Air France, holding the position until 1944. Accused of treason in November 1944, he was cleared by the High Court of Justice, which granted a dismissal of charges in light of his activities in the French Resistance.

== See also ==
=== Bibliography ===
- Yvert, Benoît (1990). yes (ed.). Dictionnaire des ministres de 1789 à 1989. Présence de l'histoire (in French). Paris: Perrin. p. 1028. ISBN 978-2262007102.
