= Orignac =

- Commune
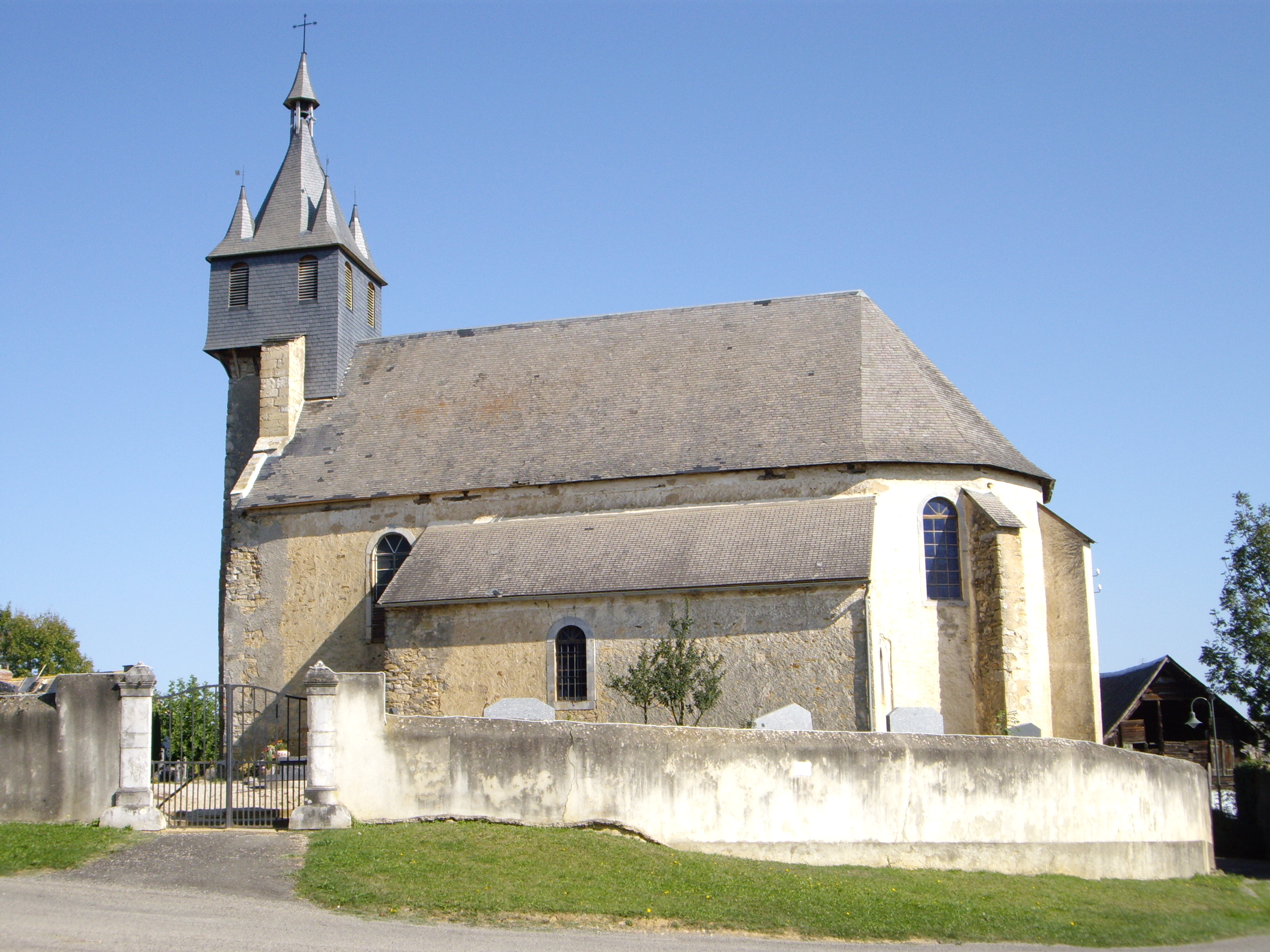
- The church of Saint-Martin

- Coat of arms
- Location of Orignac
- Location within France Location within Occitanie
- Coordinates: 43°07′33″N 0°10′14″E
- Country: France
- Region: Occitania
- Department: Hautes-Pyrénées
- Arrondissement: Bagnères-de-Bigorre
- Canton: La Vallée de l'Arros et des Baïses
- Intercommunality: CC de la Haute-Bigorre

Government
  - Mayor (2020–2026): Claude Irr
- Area^{1}: 9.91 km^{2} (3.83 sq mi)
- Elevation: 550 m (1,800 ft)
- Highest elevation: 568 m (1,864 ft)
- Lowest elevation: 393 m (1,289 ft)
- Population (2023): 253
  - Density: 25.5/km^{2} (66.1/sq mi)
- Time zone: UTC+01:00 (CET)
  - Summer (DST): UTC+02:00 (CEST)
- INSEE/Postal code: 65338 /65200
- ^{1} French Land Register data, which excludes lakes, ponds, glaciers > 1 km^{2} (0.386 sq mi or 247 acres) and river estuaries.

Orignac (French pronunciation: [ɔʁiɲak]; Occitan: Aurinhac) is a commune in the Hautes-Pyrénées department in south-western France.

== See also ==
- Communes of the Hautes-Pyrénées department
