= Pujols, Gironde =

Pujols
- Commune
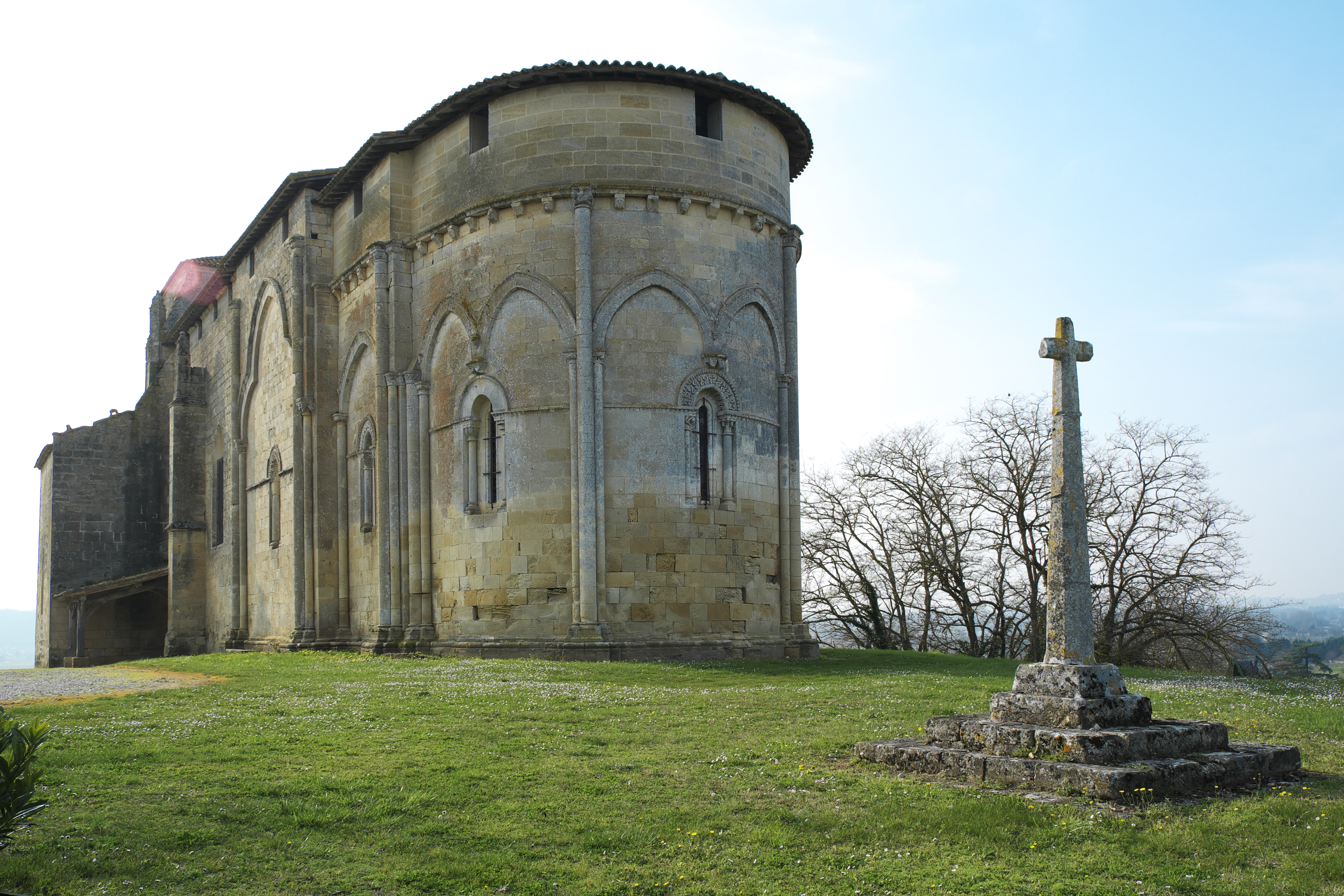
- The church in Pujols

- Coat of arms
- Location of Pujols
- Location within France Location within Nouvelle-Aquitaine
- Coordinates: 44°48′28″N 0°01′47″W
- Country: France
- Region: Nouvelle-Aquitaine
- Department: Gironde
- Arrondissement: Libourne
- Canton: Les Coteaux de Dordogne
- Intercommunality: Castillon-Pujols

Government
  - Mayor (2020–2026): Delphine Condot
- Area^{1}: 7.4 km^{2} (2.9 sq mi)
- Elevation: 100 m (330 ft)
- Highest elevation: 98 m (322 ft)
- Lowest elevation: 9 m (30 ft)
- Population (2023): 524
  - Density: 71/km^{2} (180/sq mi)
- Time zone: UTC+01:00 (CET)
  - Summer (DST): UTC+02:00 (CEST)
- INSEE/Postal code: 33344 /33350
- ^{1} French Land Register data, which excludes lakes, ponds, glaciers > 1 km^{2} (0.386 sq mi or 247 acres) and river estuaries.

Pujols (French pronunciation: [pyʒɔl], also known as Pujols-sur-Dordogne; Occitan: Pujòus) is a commune in the Gironde department in Nouvelle-Aquitaine in southwestern France.

== Population ==
Historical population
Year	Pop.	±% p.a.
1968	534	—
1975	465	−1.96%
1982	517	+1.53%
1990	573	+1.29%
1999	604	+0.59%
2007	553	−1.10%
2012	594	+1.44%
2017	538	−1.96%
2023	524	−0.44%
Source: INSEE

== See also ==
- Communes of the Gironde department
