= Joseph Barthélemy =

French politician and journalist (1874–1945)

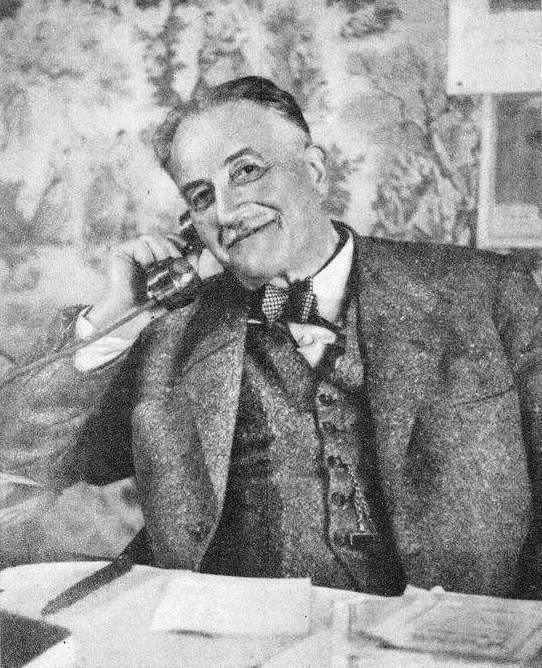
- Joseph Barthélemy in 1942

Minister of Justice of Vichy France
- In office Feb 1941 – 1943
- Preceded by: Raphaël Alibert
- Succeeded by: Maurice Gabolde

Personal details
- Born: 8 July 1874
- Died: 14 May 1945 (aged 70)

Joseph Barthélemy (8 July 1874 – 14 May 1945) was a French jurist, politician and journalist. Initially a critic of Nazi Germany, he would go on to serve as a minister in the collaborationist Vichy regime.

== Early years ==
The son of Aimé Barthélemy, a left-wing mayor of Toulouse, Joseph Barthélemy followed the legal profession and rose to become professor of constitutional law at the University of Paris. As one of the leading French Catholic intellectuals of the 1930s, Barthélemy was initially noted as a strong critic of Nazism, particularly the movement's anti-Semitism.

== Vichy France ==
Although Barthélemy was on the moderate right, he was attracted to Vichy France because of the initial approval of the new regime that was shown by his mentor, Charles Maurras. Like his ally Pierre-Étienne Flandin, Barthélemy supported pacifism in relation to Nazi Germany and was also firmly anticommunist, two factors that saw both men move towards collaborationism.

Active as a Democratic Republican Alliance deputy before the war, he succeeded Raphaël Alibert as Minister of Justice in February 1941. In that role, he signed the 1941 law that brought in the section spéciale, a supposedly-counterterrorist measure that in fact gave the new bodies the power to impose life imprisonment and death sentences without the right of appeal. In his memoirs (written before the end of the war) Barthélemy would claim that he had signed the law only under pressure from Interior Minister Pierre Pucheu. Indeed, Barthélemy sought to portray Pucheu as a hardline Nazi and a man with a taste for intrigue, conspiracy and violence. Barthélemy hoped to pass much of the blame for his own wartime record onto Pucheu.

However, Barthélemy also endorsed anti-Semitic laws and later sought to justify his actions by claiming that French Jews before the war had held a disproportionate amount of influence. Barthélemy's legal background saw him work closely with Xavier Vallat in framing laws against the Jews, notably the Second law on the status of Jews in 1941.

Furthermore he was co-signatory of a highly restrictive law that prohibited sexual relations between an adult male and a male under the age of 21. This law was a strong departure from the French tradition that did not criminalize homosexual relations and was not taken off the statute books until 1982.

== Later years ==
In 1943, the Ministry of Justice passed to Maurice Gabolde, but Barthélemy retained a high profile by leading the proceedings against Léon Blum in the infamous Riom Trial.

Barthélemy was arrested in October 1944 and imprisoned before he was transferred to hospital, where he died the following year.

Political offices
Preceded by Raphaël Alibert	Minister of Justice; 1941–1943	Succeeded by Maurice Gabolde
