= Yves Bouthillier =

French politician (1901–1977)

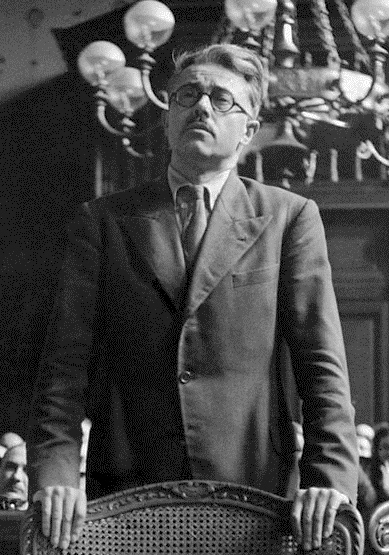
- Bouthillier in Pétain Trial in 1945
- Born: 26 February 1901; Saint-Martin-de-Ré, Charente-Maritime, France
- Died: 4 January 1977 (aged 75); Paris, France
- Education: École Centrale Paris
- Occupation: Politician
- Spouse: Germaine Bouju (1901-2003)
- Children: 1
- Parent(s): Louis Bouthillier; Mathilde Bouju

Yves Bouthillier (26 February 1901 – 4 January 1977) was a French politician. He served as the French State Minister of Finance from 1940 to 1942.

== Early life ==
Bouthillier was born in Saint-Martin-de-Ré to Mathilde Bouju and Louis Bouthillier, a merchant. He graduated from the École Centrale Paris.

== Career ==
Bouthillier served as the French State Minister of Finance from 1940 to 1942.

== Personal life ==
Bouthillier married Germaine Bouju on 3 August 1922. They had a daughter, Françoise.
