= Raphaël Alibert =

French politician

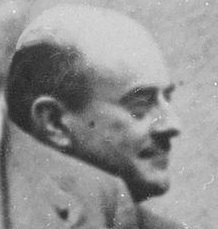

Minister of Justice
- In office 12 July 1940 – 27 January 1941
- Chief of the State: Philippe Pétain
- Preceded by: Charles Frémicourt
- Succeeded by: Joseph Barthélemy

Undersecretary of State to the Presidency of the Council
- In office 16 June 1940 – 12 July 1940
- Prime Minister: Philippe Pétain

Personal details
- Born: Henri Albert François Joseph Raphaël Alibert; 17 February 1887 Saint-Laurent-Lolmie, France
- Died: 5 June 1963 (aged 76) Paris, France
- Party: Action Française

Henri Albert François Joseph Raphaël Alibert (French pronunciation: [ɑ̃ʁi albɛʁ fʁɑ̃swa ʒozɛf ʁafaɛl alibɛʁ]; 17 February 1887 – 5 June 1963) was a French jurist and politician associated with Vichy France. A royalist and traditionalist long close to Action Française, he helped draft the constitutional acts by which Philippe Pétain assumed state powers in July 1940 and, as Minister of Justice, sponsored early Vichy laws including the review of naturalisations and the first statut des Juifs.

== Politics ==
Alibert was a Catholic monarchist and an ardent reader of Charles Maurras. He taught at the École libre des sciences politiques and worked in business and public law circles during the late Third Republic. He ran unsuccessfully for the Chamber of Deputies in 1928 and, although close to Action Française, he did not formally join the movement after its papal condemnation in 1926.

== Enters government ==
On 16 June 1940, in the cabinet formed by Pétain, Alibert became Undersecretary of State to the Presidency of the Council. He opposed proposals to transfer the government to North Africa and drafted the exposé des motifs for the Révolution nationale. On 10 July the National Assembly voted constitutional powers to Pétain; the following days Pétain signed acts—prepared in Alibert’s ministry—that concentrated executive and legislative authority in the Head of State and adjourned the Parliament sine die.

== Minister of Justice ==
Appointed Keeper of the Seals (Minister of Justice) on 12 July 1940, Alibert oversaw measures that marked the early Vichy legal order:

- the law of 22 July 1940 establishing a commission to review all naturalisations granted since 1927, which led to thousands of denaturalisations;
- the law of 13 August 1940 dissolving so-called “secret societies” (notably Freemasonry) and sequestering their assets;
- the ”first” Law on the status of Jews of 3 October 1940, excluding Jews from large parts of public life; contemporary and later accounts credit Alibert and his cabinet with a leading role in its preparation.

Late in 1940 Alibert joined other ministers lobbying Pétain to dismiss Pierre Laval, which occurred on 13 December. On 27 January 1941, amid renewed German pressure, Alibert left the government and was succeeded by Joseph Barthélemy.

== After war ==
At the Liberation, Alibert fled to Belgium. On 7 March 1947 he was condemned to death in absentia by the High Court of Justice and to indignité nationale and confiscation of property. He received amnesty in March 1959. He died in Paris on 5 June 1963.

== In culture ==
- Hôtel du Parc (1992), directed by Pierre Beuchot and Jérôme Prieur; Alibert is played by Jean Périmony.

== See also ==
- Louis Darquier de Pellepoix
- Xavier Vallat

Political offices
Preceded by Charles Frémicourt	Minister of Justice; 1940–1941	Succeeded by Joseph Barthélemy
