= Jean Zyromski =

French socialist politician

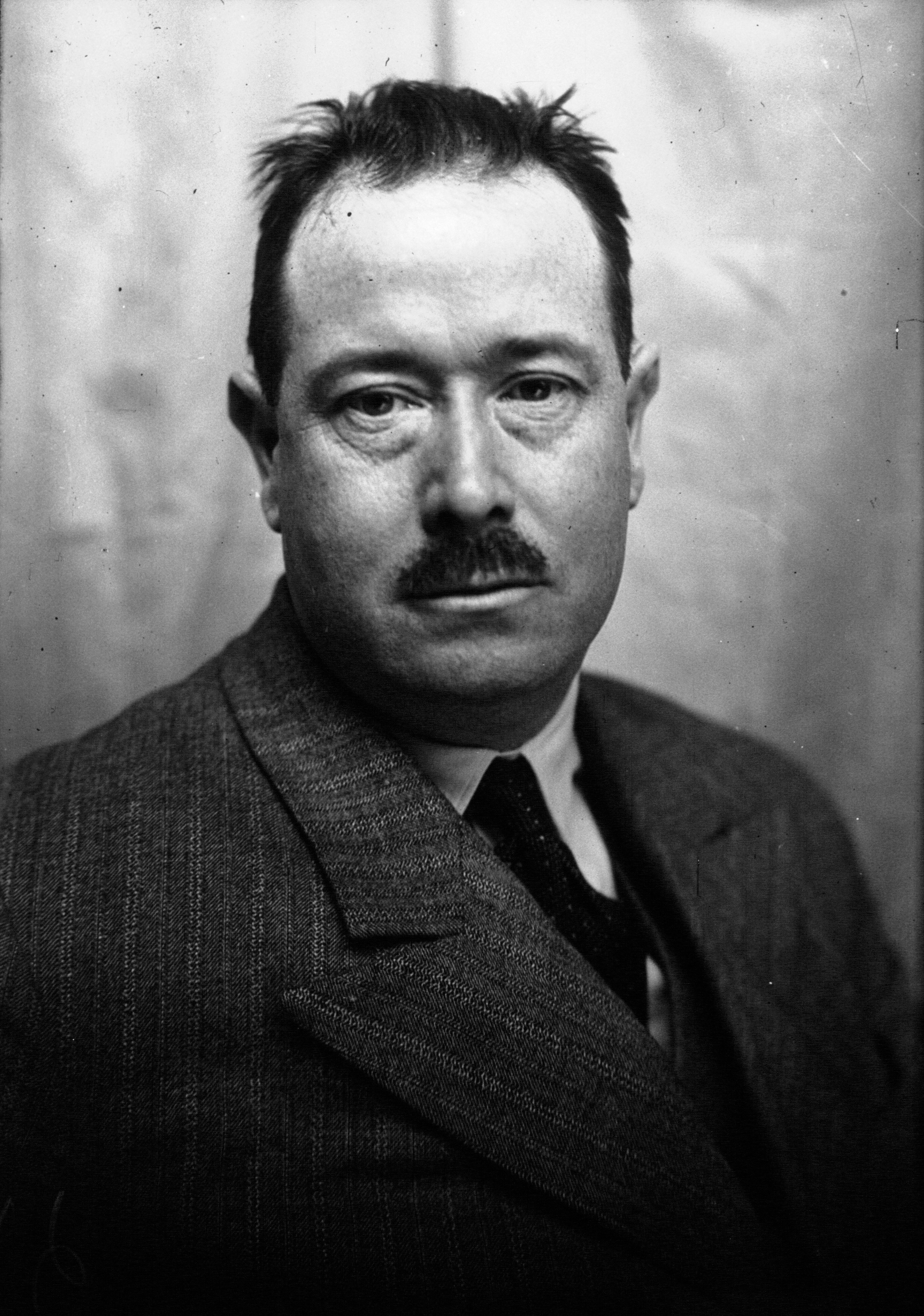
- Zyromski in 1932

Councilor of the Republic Lot-et-Garonne
- In office 8 December 1946 – 7 November 1948
- Succeeded by: Etienne Restat

Personal details
- Born: 20 April 1890 Nevers, France
- Died: 20 October 1975 (aged 85) Melun, France
- Party: SFIO (1912–1945); PCF (from 1945)

Jean Zyromski (20 April 1890 — 20 October 1975) was a French socialist politician. He was one of the leaders of the SFIO and of the Bataille Socialiste tendency on the left of the party during the interwar period and later, after the Second World War, a member of the Parti Communiste Francais (PCF). Zyromski advocated for national defense against Nazi Germany, as well as rapprochement between the SFIO and the PCF.

== Early life ==
Jean Zyromski was born in a bourgeois and Catholic, yet republican, family of Polish noble origin. His father, Ernest Zyromski, was a literary critic and a professor at the University of Toulouse, where Jean studied law later in his life. In 1913, he published his thesis focused on the question of employee rights, which followed his later political engagements. Having discovered Marxism during his studies, he joined the French Section of the Workers' International (SFIO) in 1912, becoming close to the guesdiste current under the influence of Alexandre Bracke, a writer in the l'Action Socialiste paper which Zyromski joined. At first a pacifist, when France joined WWI he followed the majority party line of supporting the Union Sacrée. Conscripted in 1914, he was wounded during the First Battle of the Marne. Coming back to civilian life in 1919, he started his career in the Administration of Social Affairs, where he eventually became an inspector. He also then joined the CGT without, however, having any official functions within it.

== Interwar career (1919–1939) ==
=== Joining the SFIO ===
In 1919, Zyromski joined the Seine federation of the SFIO. Following the Tours Congress in 1921, he stayed with the SFIO where he would become a major figure of the Seine Federation, eventually becoming its secretary from 1929 to 1931. He entered the Permanent Administrative Commission in 1921 and the National Bureau in 1929 (which he stayed in until the party's dissolution in 1940) where he assumed various functions in the SFIO's national leadership. Notably, he was the redactor in the party's official newspaper Le Populaire. However, he supported a more radical line than other lead figures within the party, such as Leon Blum and Paul Faure, opposing any alliance with the Radicals which he described as "Bourgeois" thus refusing the Cartel des Gauches of 1924.

=== La Bataille Socialiste ===
Following the failure of the Cartel des Gauches in 1926, Zyrosmki started a tendency within the Socialist Party named Bataille Socialiste (Socialist Battle/Struggle), which rallied the party's left wing and, in the following year, published a newspaper of the same name. Among members of this tendency were Léo Lagrange, Louis Lévy, Georges Dumoulin, Maurice Delépine, Ludovic Zoretti, Paul Colliette, Émile Farinet and Marceau Pivert. Zyromski's motion, presented in the 1927 Congress of Lyon, gained 23% of the mandate; as a result, the Bataille Socialiste obtained the support of the national leadership which would refuse in 1928 and 1932 to join the Radicals in a coalition. Zyromski focused on trying to achieve political unity with the communists, which would become official SFIO policy in 1928, mixing electoralist, political and syndicalist actions.

Under the leadership of Zyromski, the Bataille Socialiste fought both the right wing of the party and the "Old Guesdists" of the party's leadership, whom he accused of being too passive. While acknowledging the flaw of the Soviet economic planning, he and his tendency would refuse to condemn it outright like the rest of the party, instead considering it as an experiment to take into account. Like many others within the party, Zyromski support the idea of a planned economy as a transitionary phase to socialism, often referred to simply as "The Plan". However, unlike other tendencies, such as the Neosocialists, the Plan was not seen by Zyromski's Bataille Socialiste clique as an alternative to Marxism but as something that already existed within the Marxist tradition. Indeed, the working class is placed front and center in the decision making of the economic planning proposed by the Bataille Socialiste, unlike the Neosocialists who favoritized the "technician" managerial middle class in this role. Those tensions boiled down in 1933 at the XXXth Party Congress where Zyromski, among with other leaders such as Leon Blum, accused the Neosocialist tendency of "revisionism", leading to the exclusion of Neosocialist leaders such as Marcel Déat, Pierre Renaudel and Adrien Marquet. Zyromski believed that the socialist parties could not be satisfied with "social policy", but must focus on "economic policy" – the "policy of socialisation", or the seizure of the economic surplus. The Plan, to Zyromski, was a way to smoothly transition between capitalism and socialism.

=== Popular Front ===
Zyromski played an important role in the formation of the Popular Front, being one of the main writers of the Common Action Platform signed with the Communist Party in 1935. Carried by his enthusiasm, he later proposed organisational unity with the PCF. His policies would fail to gain traction within the party and be officially shut down by the SFIO in 1937.

=== Foreign policy ===
During his time in the SFIO, Zyromski was skeptical of decolonial efforts and independence movements, drawing on the international situation created by the treaties that ended the First World War. Instead of decolonization, he advocated for a "global development project" under the League of Nations, influenced by his idea of socialism. He believed that the League of Nations should become: "an organ of international economic and political control and naturally all colonial problems, as all international problems, would fall within its ambit."

However, as the League of Nations continued in its work, Zyromski became more and more skeptical of them and their power. In May 1926, he spoke at the SFIO's annual congress, saying that the League of Nations was primarily an alliance of great powers and thus advocating for strengthening ties between international socialist parties as well as the Labour and Socialist International. Zyromski and his supporters then created the internationalist newspaper Le Correspondance socialiste. He still maintained, though, his negative attitude towards decolonization through full independence – instead of colonies achieving independence, he advocated for trusteeship and a de-colonial change between the relationship of the colony and the colonizer.

With the onset of the Second World War, Zyromski opposed colonial appeasement. He broke with other prominent SFIO members such as Marceau Pivert over the issue of rising tension with Germany. Pivert left the Bataille Socialiste tendency and formed his own Gauche Révolutionaire (Revolutionary Left) tendency which would later form its own party, the PSOP. Zyromski advocated, against Pivert, for resistance to increasing German aggression through any means possible, including through cooperation between France and the Soviet Union, unlike his pre-1935 stance of advocating for class war and an alliance with the Communist Party of France (PCF).

His main motivation being anti-fascism, Zyromski condemned Léon Blum, who had become President of the Council under the Popular Front, over his non intervention policy in the Spanish Civil War. Zyromski resigned from the leadership of the Bataille Socialiste in protest. Around 1936, Zyromski began a flurry of activity supporting the Spanish republicans, creating a periodical named L’Espagne Socialiste to specifically support them. Zyromski's calls for intervention, however, fell on deaf ears with Blum.

== Second World War (1939–1945) ==
Profoundly affected by the failure of his policies during the Popular Front, the SFIO ultimately supporting the Radical Party's Édouard Daladier as President of the Council, and the French military defeat in June 1940, Zyromski retired a few weeks after the defeat in the Lot-et-Garonne department, disappearing from political and public life during the rest of the German occupation. He was briefly interned in the Drancy internment camp in 1943.

== Post-war career (1945–1975) ==
During the liberation of France, Zyromski joined the National Front resistance movement. Following the SFIO congress to sign the Unity Charter proposed by the PCF, he joined the PCF. He obtained his first electoral mandate in 1946 as Councilor of the Republic for the Lot-et-Garrone department, which he would keep for two years, not running for reelection in 1948. Within the PCF, Zyromski showed a surprisingly tolerated independence even when, in 1959, he signed a tribune in which he criticized the lack of internal democracy within the party. Following the 1968 invasion of Czechoslovakia, however, he stopped all activities within the party. Following the death of his wife in 1962, he moved to Melun where he died in 1975.
