= Adéodat Compère-Morel =

French Socialist politician, agronomist, orator and writer

Adéodat Constant Adolphe Compère-Morel
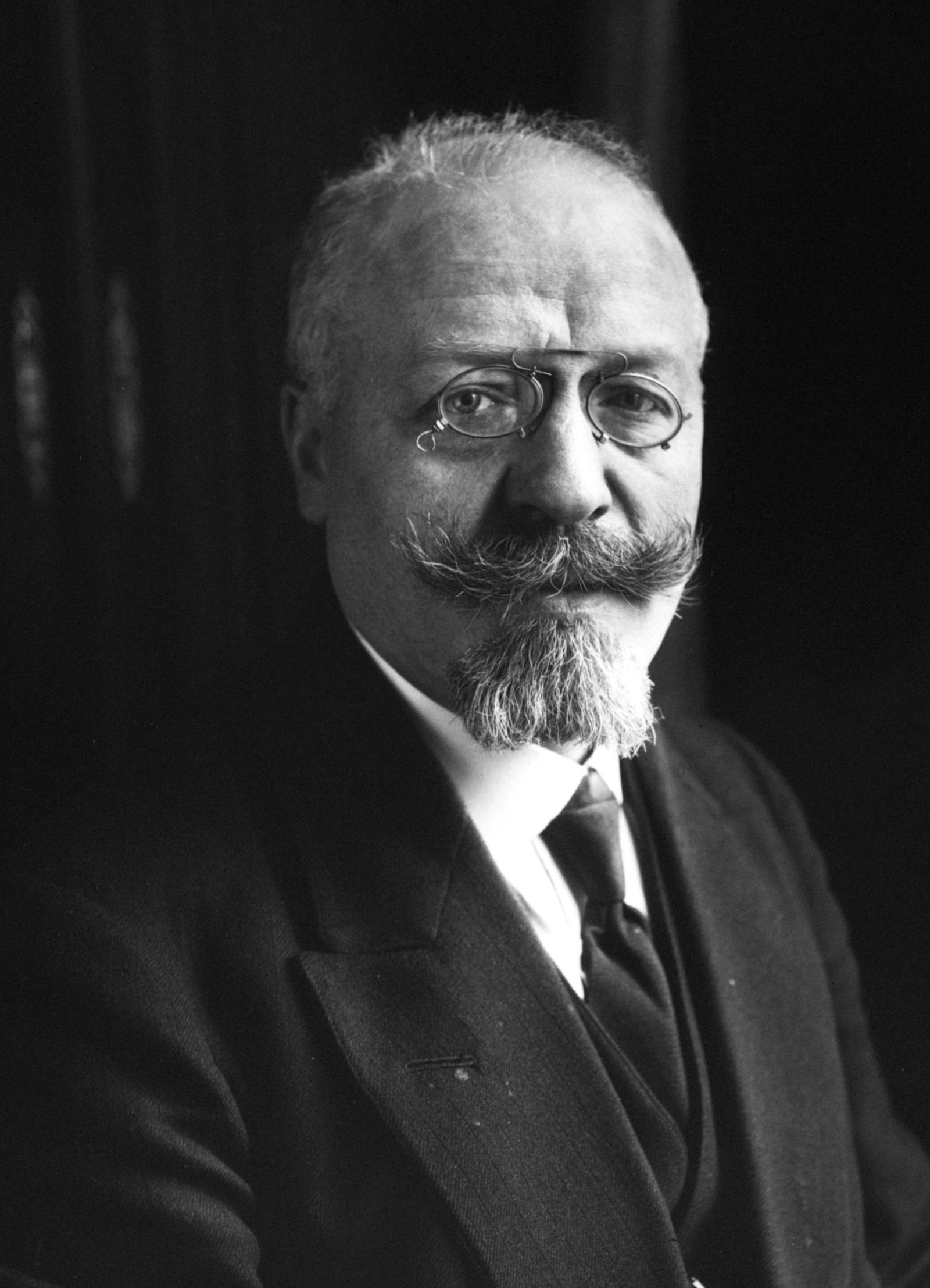
- Adéodat Compère-Morel, 1914

Deputy
- In office 1909–1936
- Constituency: Gard, département

Personal details
- Born: 5 October 1872 Breteuil, Oise France
- Died: 3 August 1941 (aged 68) Sernhac, France
- Party: French Workers' Party; Socialist Party of France; French Section of the Workers' International; Socialist Party of France – Jean Jaurès Union

Adéodat Constant Adolphe Compère-Morel (5 October 1872 – 3 August 1941) was a French Socialist politician, agronomist, orator and writer. Characterized as a Marxist doctrinaire, he was one of the founders of the Socialist Party of France (Parti socialiste de France, PSdF). A gifted propagandist, he was a particular expert on social reform in rural France and became viewed as his party's agrarian specialist. He was an associate of the likes of revolutionary Marxist socialist journalist and literary critic Paul Lafargue and authored many books and papers, several of which were partly written with Lafargue. His best known and most influential work was Encyclopédie socialiste syndicale et coopérative de l'International ouvrière, published in 1912.

== Biography ==
Compère-Morel was born at Breteuil, Oise, northern France on 5 October 1872. His father was a gardener.

In 1891, he belonged to the French Workers' Party (Parti Ouvrier Français, PDF), and then joined the Socialist Party of France during the merger of 1902, which was followed by the 1905 merger with the French Section of the Workers' International (Section Française de l'Internationale Ouvrière, SFIO). At the 1920 SFIO Tours Congress, he chose to remain in the ranks of the SFIO rather than leave with other members who went on to found the French Communist Party (Parti communiste français, PCF). After failing three times as parliamentary candidate in his home department, in 1898, 1902, and 1906, he was elected to the Chamber of Deputies of France representing Gard, département, in April 1909, under the SFIO. He was consistently re-elected until 1936, when he retired for health reasons. From 1910 to 1936, he served within six successive parliaments, chairing the Regulations Committee from 1932. His terms representing the Chamber of Deputies were 25 April 1909 - 24 April 1910 (SFIO), 24 April 1910 - 26 April 1914 (SFIO), 26 April 1914 - 16 November 1919 (SFIO), 16 November 1919 - 11 May 1924 (SFIO), 11 May 1924 - 29 April 1928 (SFIO), 29 April 1928 - 8 May 1932 (SFIO), and 8 May 1932 - 1936 (First SFIO, then PSdF).

"Alcoholism, like clericalism, like militarism, is an effect of the capitalist regime—hence it will all fall with the disappearance of this regime... Transform the social milieu and ensure well-being to all, and alcoholism will disappear.". (A. Compère-Morel)

—

In 1921, when the daily newspaper L'Humanité rallied behind the PCF, Compère-Morel and Léon Blum became the political leaders of the French socialist daily Le Populaire, the official journal of the SFIO. At the 1933 SFIO Congress in Paris, which led to the exclusion of fringe party members, Compère-Morel, Marcel Déat, Adrien Marquet, and Pierre Renaudel joined the Socialist Party of France – Jean Jaurès Union (PSdF–Jean Jaurès Union), the right wing of the SFIO. Compère-Morel was a very able propagandist, and as an expert in agrarian issues, he attempted to spread socialist reforms throughout rural France. He was an associate of the likes of revolutionary Marxist socialist journalist and literary critic Paul Lafargue and published several books and papers on socialist reform with him.

After the collapse of France in June 1940, Compère-Morel supported the collaboration policy of Philippe Pétain. He died at Sernhac, Gard, in what was then southern Vichy France in the following year.

== Works ==
Compère-Morel published a significant number of books and essays on socialism and agricultural reform. He was a particular expert on rural France, who became viewed as his party's agrarian specialist. His most significant published works were his encyclopedia and his dictionary. Encyclopédie socialiste syndicale et coopérative de l'International ouvrière was published between 1912 and 1921 in 12 volumes, edited in part in collaboration with Jean Lorris. He wrote the sections on Charles Rappoport, Paul-Louis, Hubert Rouger, Jean Longuet, Jean-Baptiste Séverac, Pierre Brizon, and Ernest Poisson. His dictionary, Grand dictionnaire socialiste du mouvement politique et économique national et international, was published in 1924.

=== Publications ===
- Du Socialisme, par le citoyen Compère-Morel (1894)
- La vérité aux paysans, par un campagnard with Georges Renard (1897)
- Les propos d'un rural: Texte imprimé with Paul Lafargue (1905)
- Concentration capitaliste, organisation collectiviste (1906)
- L'Exploitation agricole et le socialisme (1907)
- La Question agraire en France (1908)
- Les Propos d'un rural (1908)
- Le socialisme et les paysans (1909)
- Le vrai socialisme: conférence faite à Lyon, salle Etienne Dollet (1911)
- Questions d'hier et d'aujourd'hui: le réformisme bourgeois (1911)
- L'Action syndicale. Discours (1911)
- Le socialisme aux champs (1912)
- Le Socialisme chez les travailleurs de la terre (1912)
- Encyclopédie socialiste syndicale et coopérative de l'International ouvrière with Jean Lorris (1912)
- Librairie du Parti socialiste (1913)
- La production agricole pendant la guerre (1918)
- Le programme socialiste de réformes agraires (1919)
- Socialisme et Bolchevisme. Pourquoi nous n'avons-pas adhéré à ... (1921)
- Pour les travailleurs de la terre: discours prononcé à la Chambre (1922)
- Grand dictionnaire socialiste du mouvement politique et économique national et international (1924)
- La Civilisation en péril. Le Massacre des hommes with Léon Blum (1930)
- La Petite propriété paysanne et le socialisme (1931)
- Jules Guesde: le socialisme fait homme, 1845-1922 (1937)
- Le Socialisme et la terre (1938)
- Le socialisme rural
