= Neosocialism =

Interwar Francophone political movement

Neosocialism was a political faction that existed in France and Belgium during the 1930s and which included several revisionist tendencies in the French Section of the Workers' International (SFIO). During the 1930s, the faction gradually distanced itself from revolutionary Marxism and reformist socialism while stopping short of merging into the traditional class-collaborative movement represented by the Radical-Socialist Party. Instead, they advocated a revolution from above, which they termed as a constructive revolution. In France, where they had been influenced by the Belgians, this brought them into conflict with the Socialist Party's traditional policy of anti-governmentalism and the neosocialists were expelled from SFIO. Some of its promoters looked favourably on fascism and became wartime collaborators during the occupation of France, while others joined the French Resistance and were promoters of the reforms in the post-war period, such as planisme (planism), territorial planning, and regionalism.

== History ==
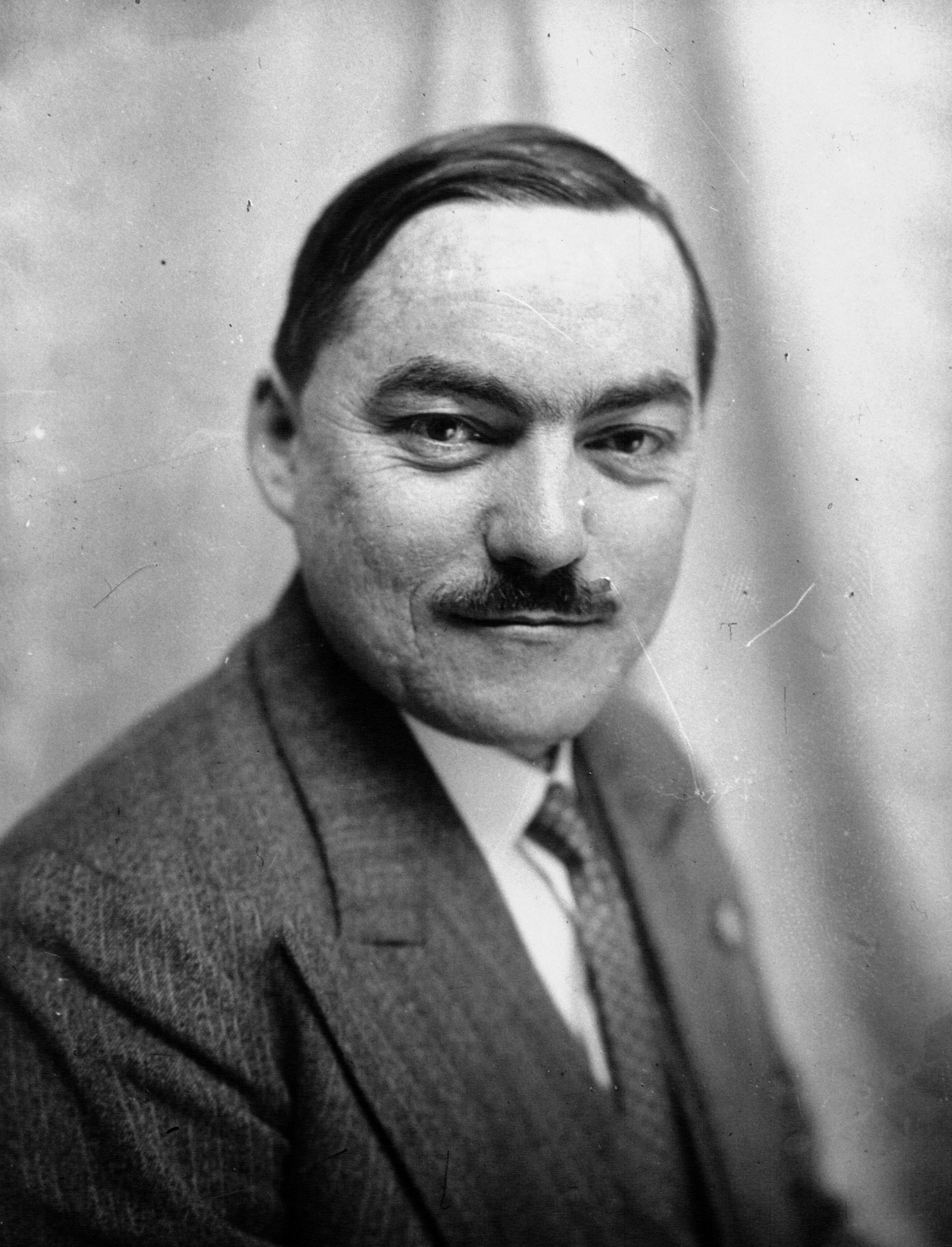
Marcel Déat

In the wake of the Great Depression, a group of parliamentary deputies led by Henri de Man in Belgium (the leader of the Belgian Labour Party's right-wing and founder of the ideology of planisme, i.e. planism, referring to economic planning) and in France by Marcel Déat and Pierre Renaudel (leader of the SFIO's right wing), René Belin of the General Confederation of Labour, and the Young Turk current of the Radical-Socialist Party through Pierre Mendès France argued that the unprecedented scale of the global economic crisis, and the sudden success of national-populist parties across Europe, meant that time had run out for socialists to slowly pursue either of the traditional stances of the parliamentary left: gradual progressive reformism or Marxist-inspired popular revolution. Instead, influenced by de Man's planism, they promoted a "constructive revolution" headed by the state, where a democratic mandate would be sought to develop technocracy and a planned economy.

This approach saw great success in the Belgian Labour Party in 1933–1934, where it was adopted as official policy with the support of the party's right (De Man) and left (Paul-Henri Spaak) wings, although by 1935 enthusiasm had waned. Such ideas also influenced the non-conformist movement of the 1930s on the French right. Earlier in 1930, Déat published Perspectives socialistes (Socialist Perspectives), a revisionist work closely influenced by de Man's planism. Along with over a hundred articles written in La vie socialiste (The Socialist Life), the review of the SFIO's right-wing, Perspective socialistes marked the shift of Déat from classical socialism to neosocialism. Déat replaced class struggle with class collaboration and national solidarity, advocated social corporatism as a model of organisation, replaced the Marxist socialist mode of production with anti-capitalism and supported a technocratic state, which would plan the economy and in which parliamentarism would be replaced by political technocracy.

The neosocialist faction inside of the SFIO, which included the senior party figures Déat and Pierre Renaudel, was expelled at the November 1933 party congress, partly for its admiration for Italian fascism, and largely for its revisionist stances: the neosocialists advocated alliances with the middle classes and favoured making compromises with the bourgeois Radical-Socialist Party to enact the SFIO's program one issue at a time. After having been expelled from the SFIO, Déat and his followers created the Socialist Party of France – Jean Jaurès Union (1933–1935); by the close of 1935, the emergence of the Popular Front had stolen the thunder for much of the neosocialists' tactical and policy proposals, and the Jean Jaurès Union merged with the more traditional class-collaborative Independent Socialists and Socialist Republicans to form the small Socialist Republican Union. Within the General Confederation of Labour, neosocialism was represented by Belin's Syndicats (then Redressements)'s faction. On the other hand, de Man's planism influenced the left wing of the progressive-centrist Radical-Socialist Party, known as Young Turks (among them Mendès-France).

At first, the neosocialists remained part of the broader left. Déat led his splinter party into the Socialist Republican Union, a merger of various revisionist socialist parties, and participated in the Popular Front coalition of 1936. Disillusionment in democracy eventually caused many neosocialists to distance themselves from the traditional left and call for more authoritarian government. After 1936, many evolved toward a form of participatory and nationalistic socialism, which led them to join with the reactionary right and support the collaborationist Vichy regime during World War II (e.g. Déat, Paul Faure, Adrien Marquet, and Barthélemy Montagnon). For instance, Belin and Déat (who founded the collaborationist National Popular Rally) became members of the Vichy government, and Déat's neosocialism was discredited in France after the war. Others (e.g. Henry Hauck, Max Hymans, Paul Ramadier, and Louis Vallon) joined the Resistance; Ramadier became Prime Minister of France in the postwar period and enacted the reforms of the new French Republic including voting in favour of the Marshall Plan, while Max Bonnafous was Minister of Agriculture and Supplies from 1942 to 1944 in the Vichy government but later joined the Resistance, for which he obtained a pardon.

== See also ==
- Fabian Society
- French Left
- George Bernard Shaw
- H. G. Wells
- History of social democracy
- History of socialism
- Left-wing nationalism
- Politics of Belgium
- Politics of France
- Production for use
- Thorstein Veblen
- Yellow socialism
