= Charles Berthézenne =

French politician (1871–1942)

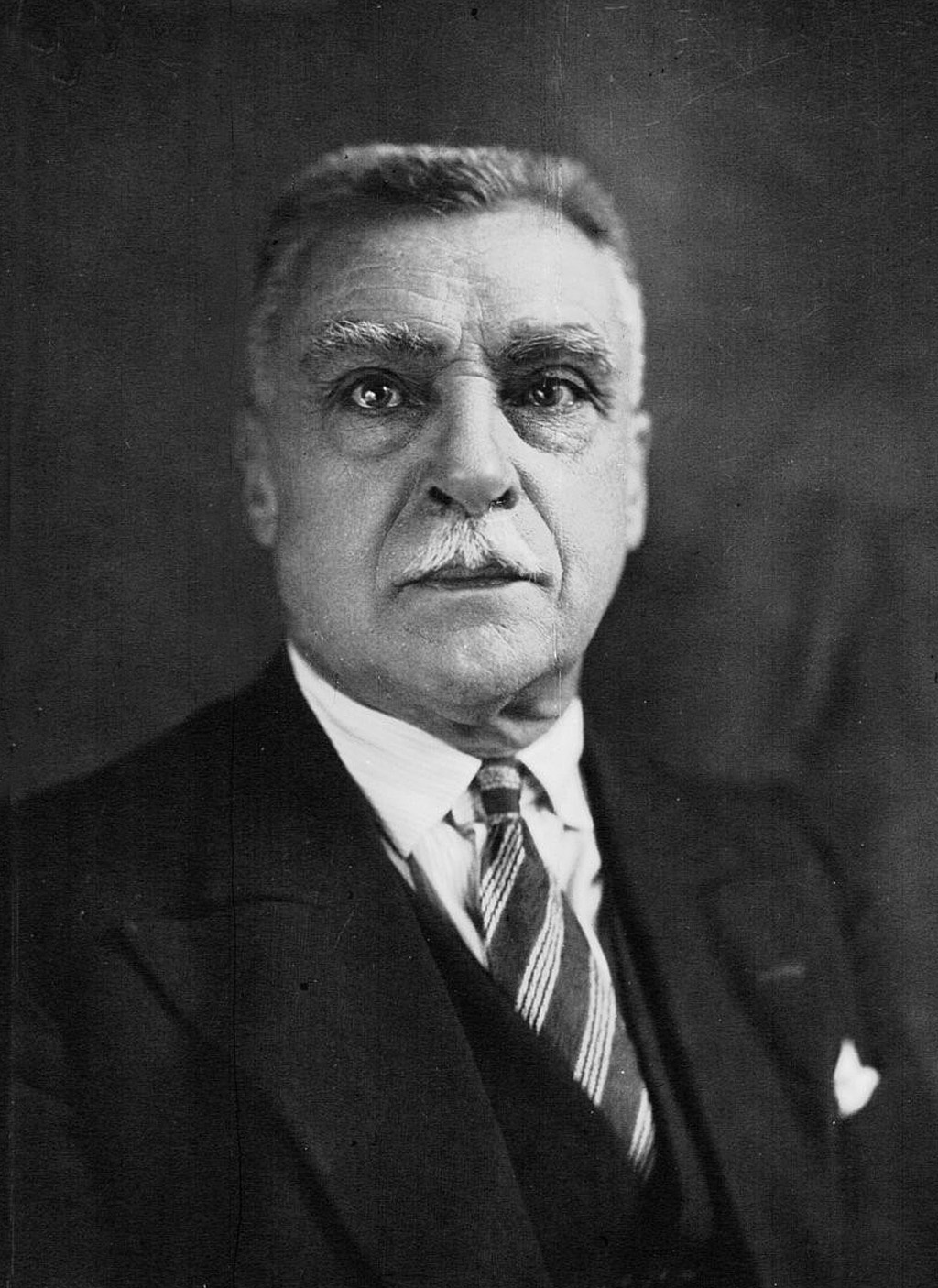
Charles Berthézenne

Charles Berthézenne (30 January 1871 in Valleraugue – 11 June 1942) was a French politician. He represented the Republican-Socialist Party (from 1928 to 1935) and the Socialist Republican Union (from 1935 to 1940) in the Chamber of Deputies. On 10 July 1940, he voted in favour of granting the cabinet led by Marshal Philippe Pétain authority to draw up a new constitution, thereby effectively ending the French Third Republic and establishing Vichy France.
