= Maxence =

Maxence is a French name, derived from the Latin Maxentius. As a first name, it is mostly given to males.

== People ==
=== Surname ===
- Edgar Maxence, a French symbolist painter
- Jean-Luc Maxence (1946–2024), a French poet, publisher and writer
- Jean-Pierre Maxence, a French non-conformist writer

=== Middle name ===
- Ange Hyacinthe Maxence, baron de Damas (1785–1862), French general and minister
- Jean Maxence Berrou (born 1985), French modern pentathlete
- Louis Henri Maxence Bertrand Rainier III, full name of Rainier III, Prince of Monaco

=== First name ===
- Maxence Bibié (1891-1950), French politician
- Maxence Van der Meersch (1907–1951), French Flemish writer
- Maxence Boitez (born 1990), French musician, known professionally as Ridsa
- Maxence Carlier (born 1997), French footballer
- Maxence Caron (born 1976), French writer and philosopher
- Maxence Caqueret (born 2000), French professional footballer
- Maxence Cyrin, French pianist and composer
- Maxence Danet-Fauvel (born 1993), French actor and model
- Maxence Derrien (born 1993), French footballer
- Maxence Flachez (born 1972), French football defender
- Maxence Lacroix (born 2000), French footballer
- Maxence Larrieu (born 1934), French classical flautist
- Maxence Layet (born 1971), French journalist and author
- Maxence Mailfort (born 1949), French film and television actor
- Maxence Muzaton (born 1990), French alpine ski racer
- Maxence Parrot (born 1994), Canadian snowboarder
- Maxence Perrin (born 1955), French actor
- Maxence Prévot (born 1997), French footballer

== Places ==
- Canton of Pont-Sainte-Maxence, France
- Pont-Sainte-Maxence, a commune in the Oise department in northern France
  - Gare de Pont-Sainte-Maxence, railway station serving Pont-Sainte-Maxence
