= Minister of Air (France) =

- Ministre de l'Air
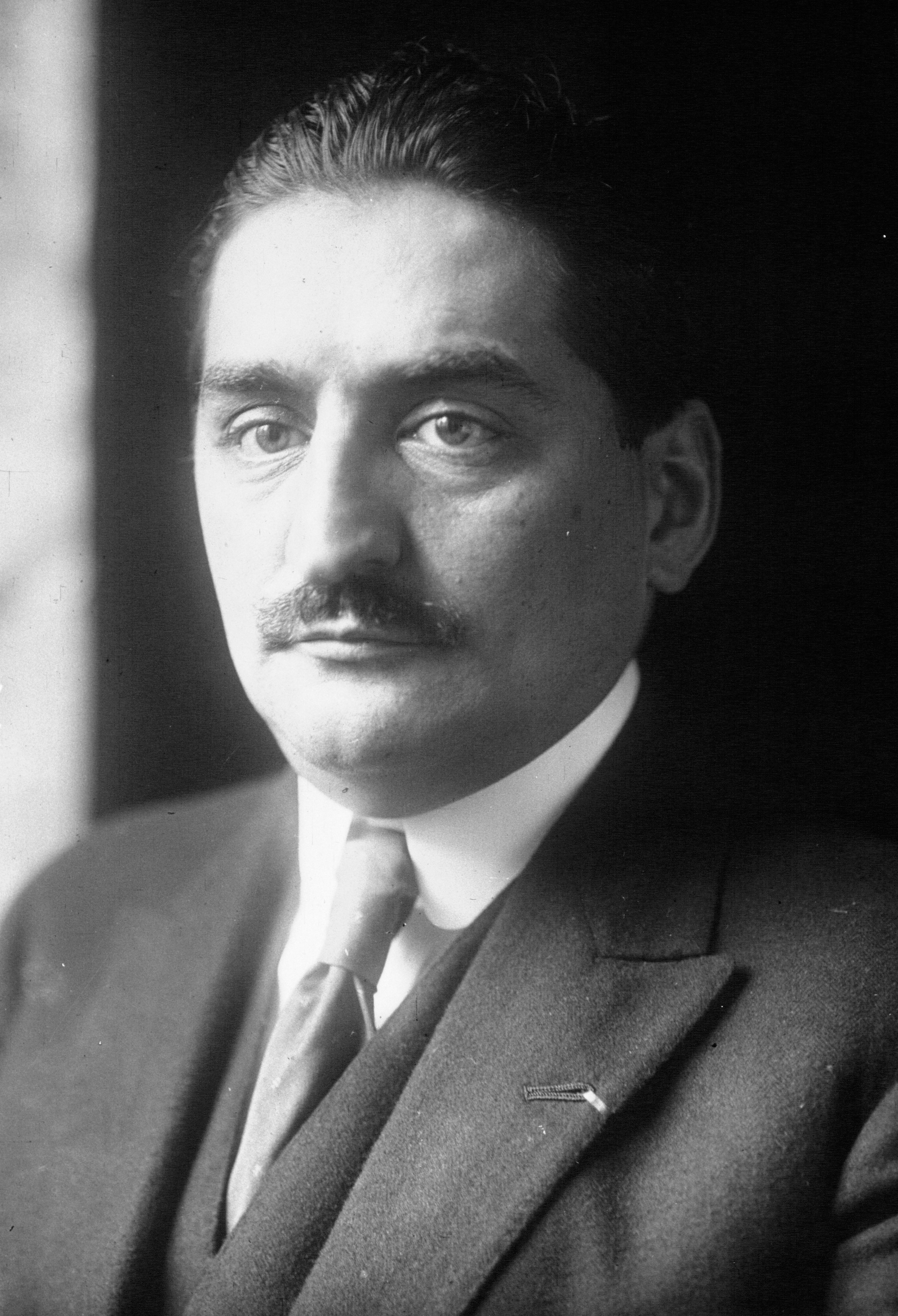
- Longest serving Laurent Eynac; 14 September 1928 – 13 December 1930; 21 March 1940 – 16 June 1940
- Government of France
- Status: Abbolished
- Member of: cabinet
- Formation: Laurent Eynac
- First holder: 14 September 1928
- Final holder: André Maroselli
- Abolished: 22 October 1947
- Succession: Minister of Defense

From 1928-1947, the Minister of Air was, in the Government of France (and during the Vichy Regime), the cabinet member in charge of the French Air Force. The position no longer exists and its functions have been merged with the Minister of Defense.

== Ministers of Air ==
=== Third French Republic (1870–1940) ===
No.	Picture	Minister of Air	Took office	Left office	Time in office	Party	Cabinet
1	Laurent Eynac	Laurent Eynac (1886–1970)	14 September 1928	13 December 1930	2 years, 90 days	RI	Briand XI; Tardieu I Chautemps I Tardieu II
2	Paul Painlevé	Paul Painlevé (1863–1933)	13 December 1930	27 January 1931	45 days	PRS	Steeg
3	Jacques-Louis Dumesnil	Jacques-Louis Dumesnil (1882–1956)	27 January 1931	20 February 1932	1 year, 24 days	PRV	Laval I–II–III
(2)	Paul Painlevé	Paul Painlevé (1863–1933)	3 June 1932	29 January 1933	344 days	PRS	Tardieu III
4	Pierre Cot	Pierre Cot (1895–1977)	31 January 1933	9 February 1934	1 year, 11 days	PRV	Sarraut I Daladier I–II
5	Victor Denain	Victor Denain (1880–1952)	9 February 1934	24 January 1936	1 year, 349 days	Independent	Doumergue II; Flandin; Bouisson
6	Marcel Déat	Marcel Déat (1894–1955)	24 January 1936	4 June 1936	132 days	USR	Sarraut II
(4)	Pierre Cot	Pierre Cot (1895–1977)	4 June 1936	18 January 1938	1 year, 228 days	PRV	Blum I–II
7	Guy La Chambre	Guy La Chambre (1898–1975)	18 January 1938	21 March 1940	2 years, 63 days	PRV	Blum II; Daladier III
(1)	Laurent Eynac	Laurent Eynac (1886–1970)	21 March 1940	16 June 1940	87 days	PRV	Reynaud

=== World War II (1940–1944) ===
Vichy

No.	Picture	Minister of Air	Took office	Left office	Time in office	Party	Cabinet
1	Bertrand Pujo	Bertrand Pujo (1878–1964)	16 June 1940	6 September 1940	87 days	Independent	Pétain; Laval IV
2	Jean Bergeret [fr; it; nl; sv]	Jean Bergeret (1895–1956)	6 September 1940	18 April 1942	1 year, 306 days	Independent	Flandin II; Darlan
3	Jean-François Jannekeyn	Jean-François Jannekeyn (1892–1971)	18 April 1942	20 August 1944	2 years, 124 days	Independent	Laval V

Free French Forces

No.	Picture	Commissioner of the Air Force	Took office	Left office	Time in office	Party	Cabinet
1	Martial Valin	Martial Valin (1898–1980)	24 September 1941	7 June 1943	1 year, 256 days	Independent	CNF
2	André Le Troquer	André Le Troquer (1884–1963)	9 November 1943	4 April 1944	147 days	SFIO	CNF
3	Fernand Grenier	Fernand Grenier (1901–1992)	4 April 1944	10 September 1944	159 days	PCF	CNF

=== Fourth French Republic (1946–1958) ===
No.	Picture	Minister of Air	Took office	Left office	Time in office	Party	Cabinet
1	Charles Tillon	Charles Tillon (1897–1993)	10 September 1944	21 November 1945	1 year, 102 days	PCF	de Gaulle I
2	André Maroselli [fr]	André Maroselli (1893–1970)	22 January 1947	22 October 1947	2 years, 90 days	PRV	Ramadier I

== See also ==
- Minister of the Armies (France)
- List of Naval Ministers of France
