= Max Bonnafous =

French politician (1900–1975)

Minister and Secretary of State for Agriculture and Supplies
- In office 11 September 1942 – 6 January 1944
- Preceded by: Jacques Le Roy Ladurie
- Succeeded by: Pierre Cathala

Personal details
- Born: 21 January 1900 Bordeaux, Gironde, France
- Died: 16 October 1975 (aged 75) Nice, Alpes-Maritimes. France
- Occupation: Sociologist
- Known for: Oeuvres de Jean Jaurès (editor)
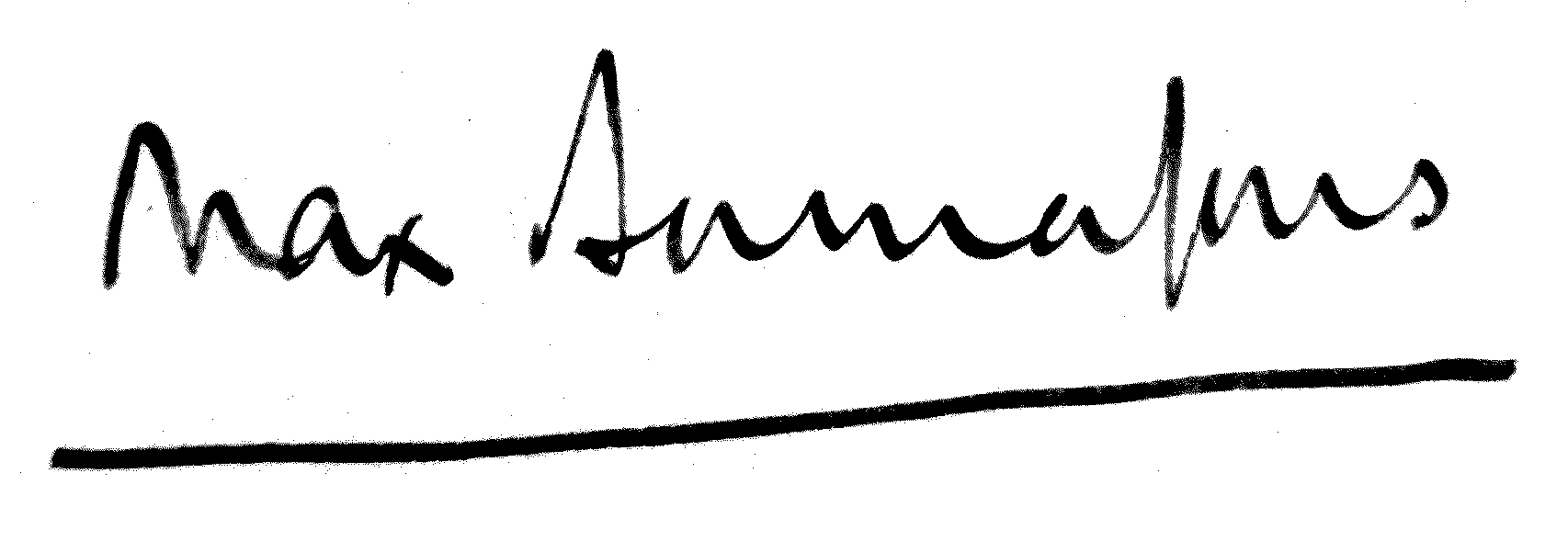
- Signature

Max Bonnafous (21 January 1900 – 16 October 1975) was a French sociologist who was Minister of Agriculture and Supplies from 1942 to 1944 in the Vichy government.

== Early years ==
Max Bonnafous was born on 21 January 1900 in Bordeaux, Gironde. He graduated from the École Normale Supérieure in 1920, studied at the French Academy in Rome, and passed the agrégation in philosophy in 1924. He joined the French Section of the Workers' International (SFIO). He made substantial contributions to the Année sociologique, nouvelle série, which first appeared in 1925. He became a professor at the lycée in Constantinople. Bonnafous planned a thesis on suicide. He published Le Suicide à Constantinople: Etude statique et essai d'interprétation sociologique in 1927. Bonnafous was appointed to the chair of sociology in the University of Bordeaux in 1930, and held this position until 1940 but did not produce significant work on the subject.

In 1929 Bonnafous undertook to edit the selected works of the socialist leader Jean Jaurès (1859–1914) in about twenty volumes. He chose to organize the material around six themes: socialism, pacifism, anti-clericalism, political battles, economic and social questions, and the world and men. The first volume was published in May 1931, and nine volumes appeared before 1939. The outbreak of World War II (1939–45) interrupted the work, and his files were scattered during the German occupation of France. He said that afterwards he did not have the courage or the opportunity to reassemble them.

In October 1933 Bonnafous published Néo-socialisme ? ordre, autorité, nation in which he contributed the preface and commentary to important speeches by Marcel Déat, Adrien Marquet and Barthélémy Montagnon at the Congress of Paris. They argued that Socialists must focus on defeating fascism, and to do so must gain the support of the middle classes and eliminate unemployment. Strong national states were necessary to control and direct the economy. Socialists must study and learn from the "intermediary regimes" of economic and social organization being tried in Italy, Germany, Russia and America, which were neither purely Socialist or purely Capitalist. Forty deputies were expelled from the SFIO at a special congress of the Socialist Party on 5 November 1933, most because they refused to accept the ban on participation in cabinets led by Radicals. Bonnafous, Marcel Déat, Adrien Marquet, Barthélémy Montagnon and others were among the Neo-Socialists who were expelled. Their slogan "Order, Authority, Nation" was repugnant to the Socialist leader Léon Blum.

Bonnafous served as cabinet secretary to government ministers in 1934 and 1938.

== World War II ==
When the war broke out in 1939 Bonnafous, in Bordeaux, was one of the five sociology professors in France. In 1940 he chose to collaborate with the Vichy regime. Bonnafous was cabinet secretary to the Minister of the Interior in 1940. He was then appointed a prefect. Bonnafous was Secretary of State for Agriculture and Supplies from 18 April 1942 to 11 September 1942 in the 2nd cabinet of Pierre Laval. He was Minister and Secretary of State for Agriculture and Supplies from 11 September 1942 to 6 January 1944 in the same cabinet. His wife, Hélène Sérieux-Bonnafous, was a psychiatrist. On 4 December 1942 his secretariat allocated a significant increase in rations to the inmates of lunatic asylums. Bonnafous tried to speed up the creation of the Peasant Corporation, which would unite rural producers in France and give them the apparatus of self-government. The body that was eventually established in 1943 no longer had broad support among the peasants and was too late to make any real change.

== Later career ==
After the Liberation of France Bonnafous was condemned to national disgrace, but was soon pardoned due to his service to the Resistance. However, he retired from political life. He had an affair with the actress Gaby Morlay (1893–1964) during the war, and as a result the actress was investigated for collaboration with the Nazis after the liberation. Later Bonnafous married Morlay, who continued to play important roles in the 1940s and 1950s. Max Bonnafous died at the age of 75 on 16 October 1975 in Nice, Alpes-Maritimes.

== Publications ==
- Max Bonnafous, ed. (1926), Le Scrutin (in French), Paris: Henry Goulet, p. 169
- Bonnafous, Max (1927), Le Suicide à Constantinople: Etude statique et essai d'interprétation sociologique (in French)
- Jean Jaurès (1931–1939), Max Bonnafous (ed.), Oeuvres de Jean Jaurès (in French), Paris: Rieder
- Max-Bonnafous (1931), preface, Pour la paix, by Jean Jaurès (in French), vol. 2 La Paix menacée 1903-1906, Paris: Rieder
- Max Bonnafous (1932–1933), "Une méthode positive de science économique : les idées de M. François Simiand", Recherches Philosophiques (in French), Paris: Boivin: 497–506
- Max-Bonnafous (1933), preface, Néo-socialisme ? ordre, autorité, nation. Discours prononcés au Congrès socialiste de juillet 1933, by Marcel Déat; Adrien Marquet; Barthélémy Montagnon (in French), Paris: B. Grasset, p. 140
- Max Bonnafous (1943), Deux discours à la Corporation paysanne (in French), Paris: Plon, p. 91
- Max Bonnafous, preface (1943), L'Esprit d'entr'aide. La Collecte agricole (in French), Paris: Inter-France, p. 19
- Max-Bonnafous (1943), foreword, Le Marché noir, by Henri Davoust (in French), Maurice Constantin-Weyer, preface, Bellegarde: Impr. S.A.D.A.G., p. 23
- Max-Bonnafous (1944), foreword, Le Soc brisé, by Georges Eulin (pseud of Georges Gasseau) (in French), Henry Dorgères, preface, Paris: Billaudot, p. 174
- Jean Jaurès (1995), Max Bonnafous (ed.), L'armée nouvelle (in French), Toulouse: Ed. Histoire et politique, p. 465
- Jean Jaurès (1995), Max Bonnafous (ed.), De la réalité du monde sensible (in French), Toulouse: Ed. Histoire et politique, p. 296
- Jean Jaurès (1995), Max Bonnafous (ed.), Études socialistes (in French), Toulouse: Ed. Histoire et politique, p. 432
- Jean Jaurès (1995), Max Bonnafous (ed.), Pour la paix (in French), Toulouse: Ed. Histoire et politique

== Sources ==
- Becker, Jean-Jacques (2012-10-31), Introduction, Oeuvres tome 13: L'Armée nouvelle, by Jaurès, Jean, Jean-Jacques Becker (ed.), (in French), Fayard, ISBN 978-2-213-67597-8
- Besnard, Philippe (2003), Sammlung (in French), Librairie Droz, ISBN 978-2-600-00872-3
- Bueltzingsloewen, Isabelle von (2015-01-28), "Starvation in French Mental Hospitals under Nazi Occupation", Silence, Scapegoats, Self-reflection: The Shadow of Nazi Medical Crimes on Medicine and Bioethics, Volker Roelcke, Sascha Topp, Etienne Lepicard: Vandenhoeck & Ruprecht, ISBN 978-3-8470-0365-6
- Ferrette, Jean (2013), "La sociologie sous Vichy: rupture on continuité ?", Les sociologues sous Vichy (in French), Editions L'Harmattan, ISBN 978-2-296-51316-7
- Fiechter, Jean-Jacques (1965), Le Socialisme français, de l'affaire Dreyfus à la Grande guerre (in French), Librairie Droz, ISBN 978-2-600-04285-7
- Heilbron, Johan (2015-07-09), French Sociology, Cornell University Press, ISBN 978-1-5017-0116-0
- Jackson, Julian (2002-08-22), The Politics of Depression in France 1932-1936, Cambridge University Press, ISBN 978-0-521-52267-0
- Jaisson, Marie (1999), Maurice Halbwachs et les sciences de son temps (in French), Presses Univ. Septentrion, ISBN 978-2-85939-609-1
- Jenkins, Brian; Millington, Chris (2015-03-24), France and Fascism: February 1934 and the Dynamics of Political Crisis, Routledge, ISBN 978-1-317-50725-3
- Lackerstein, Dr Debbie (2013-07-28), National Regeneration in Vichy France: Ideas and Policies, 1930–1944, Ashgate Publishing, Ltd., ISBN 978-1-4094-8297-0
- Max BONNAFOUS (in French), Ministère de l’agriculture, de l’agroalimentaire et de la forêt, 2012-08-31, archived from the original on 2016-03-06
- Oscherwitz, Dayna; Higgins, MaryEllen (2009-09-02), The A to Z of French Cinema, Scarecrow Press, ISBN 978-0-8108-7038-3
- Rebérious, Madeleine (2001-06-13), foreword, Oeuvres, tome 6: L'Affaire Dreyfus, by Jaurès, Jean (in French), Fayard, ISBN 978-2-213-68318-8
