= 1946 Senegalese General Council election =

- December 1946
- All 50 seats on the General Council; 25 seats needed for a majority
- Turnout: 54.26%
Party	Leader	Seats
USR		50
This lists parties that won seats. See the complete results below.

General Council elections were held in Senegal in December 1946. The Socialist Republican Union won all 50 seats.

== Electoral system ==
Unlike other French colonies in Africa which used a dual college system, with French citizens electing part of the General Council and Africans electing the remainder, the Senegalese General Council was elected on a general roll.

== Results ==
Party	Votes	%	Seats
Socialist Republican Union			50
Total			50
Total votes	105,581	–	
Registered voters/turnout	194,599	54.26	
Source: De Benoist
