= Le Socialiste picard =

- Type: Weekly
- Founded: 1933
- Political alignment: Socialist Party of France
- Language: French language
- Headquarters: Amiens

Le Socialiste picard was a socialist weekly newspaper published from Amiens, France. It was founded in 1933 as served as the organ for the Somme Federation of the Socialist Party of France. Louis Lebel, member of parliament, was the director of the newspaper.
