= Maxence Bibié =

French politician (1891–1950)

Maxence Bibié (11 January 1891 - 24 May 1950) was a French politician.

Bibié was born in Allemans. He represented the Republican-Socialist Party (PRS) from 1924 to 1932, the French Socialist Party (PSF) from 1932 to 1936 and the Socialist Republican Union (USR) in the Chamber of Deputies. On 10 July 1940, he voted in favour of granting the cabinet presided by Marshal Philippe Pétain authority to draw up a new constitution, thereby effectively ending the French Third Republic and establishing Vichy France.
