= Joseph Paul-Boncour =

French politician and diplomat (1873–1972)

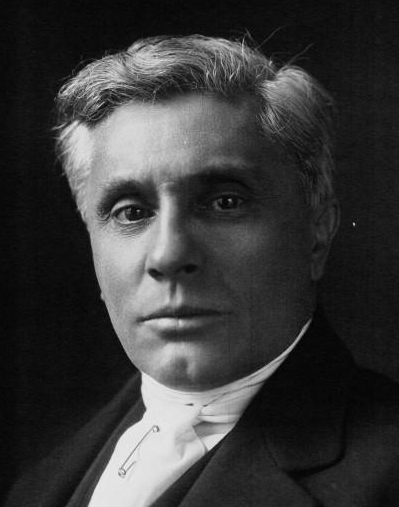
- Paul-Boncour in 1923

Prime Minister of France
- In office 18 December 1932 – 31 January 1933
- President: Albert Lebrun
- Preceded by: Édouard Herriot
- Succeeded by: Édouard Daladier

Personal details
- Born: 4 August 1873 Saint-Aignan, Loir-et-Cher, France
- Died: 28 March 1972 (aged 98) Paris, France
- Party: PRS
- Occupation: Lawyer

Augustin Alfred Joseph Paul-Boncour (French: [ʒozɛf pɔl bɔ̃kuʁ]; 4 August 1873 – 28 March 1972) was a French politician and diplomat of the Third Republic. He was a member of the Republican-Socialist Party (PRS) and served as Prime Minister of France from December 1932 to January 1933. He also served in a number of other government positions during the 1930s and as a Permanent Delegate to the League of Nations in 1936 during his tenure as Minister of State. He has been described politically as a "centre-left republican".

== Career ==
Born in Saint-Aignan, Loir-et-Cher, Paul-Boncour received a law degree from the University of Paris and became active in the labor movement, organizing the legal council of the Bourses du Travail (workers' associations). He was private secretary to Premier Pierre Waldeck-Rousseau from 1898 to 1902. Elected to the Chamber of Deputies as a Radical in 1909, he held his seat until 1914, briefly serving as Minister of Labour from March to June 1911. After serving in the military during World War I, he returned to the French National Assembly. While a member of the Assembly, he became chairman of the Foreign Affairs Committee in 1928. He was active at this time in attempts to encourage disarmament in Europe, with League of Nations negotiations with Germany in Geneva. This also included advocating an international force for the cause of mutual assistance in the league which would act to deter aggression. However his disarmament approach were the subjects of disagreement with opposition politicians under Léon Blum which resulted in Paul-Boncour resigning as the French delegate to the league.

Turning to Socialism, he joined the SFIO in 1916. Paul-Boncour left the socialist party in 1931 because he considered imperative, in face of the League of Nations progressive powerlessness, to reinforce national defence, something the socialists opposed. After his resignation from the SFIO in 1931 he joined the Republican-Socialist Party (PRS).

=== Ministerial roles ===
In 1931, Paul-Boncour was elected to the Senate, and served in that capacity until the establishment of the Vichy régime in 1940 (during World War II). During his time as a Senator, Paul-Boncour served in a variety of cabinet and diplomatic posts. He served as Minister of War in 1932. On 18 December 1932 he became Prime Minister of France and served briefly in this role until 28 January 1933.

In 1935, his part PRS merged with the French Socialist Party (PSF) and the Socialist Party of France-Jean Jaurès Union (PSdF) to form the Socialist Republican Union (USR). He was the Permanent Delegate to the League of Nations from 1932 to 1936 and Foreign Minister on two occasions (31 December 1932 to 30 January 1934 and 13 March to 8 April 1938).

=== Opposition ===
Paul-Boncour was opposed to the formation of the Vichy government, and recommended continuing the fight against Nazi Germany after the fall of France, from Algiers. As a member of the Consultative Assembly from 1944, he led the French delegation to the United Nations conference in San Francisco and signed the United Nations Charter on behalf of France. He once again served as a senator from 1946 to 1948.

=== Death ===
He died in Paris on 28 March 1972 at the age of 98.

== Paul-Boncour's Ministry, 18 December 1932 – 31 January 1933 ==
- Joseph Paul-Boncour – President of the Council and Minister of Foreign Affairs
- Édouard Daladier – Minister of War
- Camille Chautemps – Minister of the Interior
- Henri Chéron – Minister of Finance
- Albert Dalimier – Minister of Labour and Social Security Provisions
- Abel Gardey – Minister of Justice
- Georges Leygues – Minister of Marine
- Léon Meyer – Minister of Merchant Marine
- Paul Painlevé – Minister of Air
- Anatole de Monzie – Minister of National Education
- Edmond Miellet – Minister of Pensions
- Henri Queuille – Minister of Agriculture
- Albert Sarraut – Minister of Colonies
- Georges Bonnet – Minister of Public Works
- Charles Daniélou – Minister of Public Health
- Laurent Eynac – Minister of Posts, Telegraphs, and Telephones
- Julien Durand – Minister of Commerce and Industry

== List of positions held ==
Political offices
Preceded by Louis Lafferre	Minister of Labour and Social Security; 1911	Succeeded by René Renoult
Preceded by François Piétri	Minister of War; 1932	Succeeded by Édouard Daladier
Preceded by Édouard Herriot	President of the Council; 1932–1933	Succeeded by Édouard Daladier
Preceded by Édouard Herriot	Minister of Foreign Affairs; 1932–1934	Succeeded by Édouard Daladier
Preceded by Jean Fabry	Minister of National Defense and War; 1934	Succeeded by Philippe Pétain
Preceded by Yvon Delbos	Minister of Foreign Affairs; 1938	Succeeded by Georges Bonnet
Diplomatic posts
Preceded by –	Minister of State, Permanent Delegate to the League of Nations; 1936	Succeeded by –
Records
Preceded by Alfredo Solf y Muro	Oldest living state leader 14 August 1969 – 28 March 1972	Succeeded by Émile Reuter
