= Max Hymans =

French politician (1900–1961)

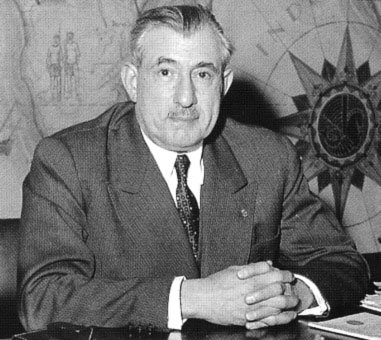

Max Hymans (2 March 1900 in Paris – 7 March 1961 in Saint-Cloud), was a notable leftist French politician, member of the resistance, and director of Air France from 1948 to 1961.

== Biography ==
Max Hymans was born in Paris on 2 March 1900. After his baccalauréat (A-level), he graduated from École centrale de Paris with an Engineering diploma, while following a law degree in parallel.

He entered as an Engineer and site manager of Clairoix close to Compiègne, Oise. He was in conflict with the management concerning French workers wages and their replacement with foreign workers who were paid lower wages.

On 22 October 1925, Hymans applied to be registered as a lawyer to the Cour d'appel of Paris. He opened a firm which specialized in cases about counterfeiting and patents.

As a member of the French Section of the Workers' International, which he joined in 1925, and from 1933 as a member of the Socialist Party of France, Hymans was a member of the National Assembly representing Indre from 1928 to 1942.

In 1941, Hymans offered his services to Free France and subsequently worked secretly for the British Special Operations Executive. After the war, he was elected to the council of Valençay and was mayor there from 1949 to 1961.

== Gallery ==
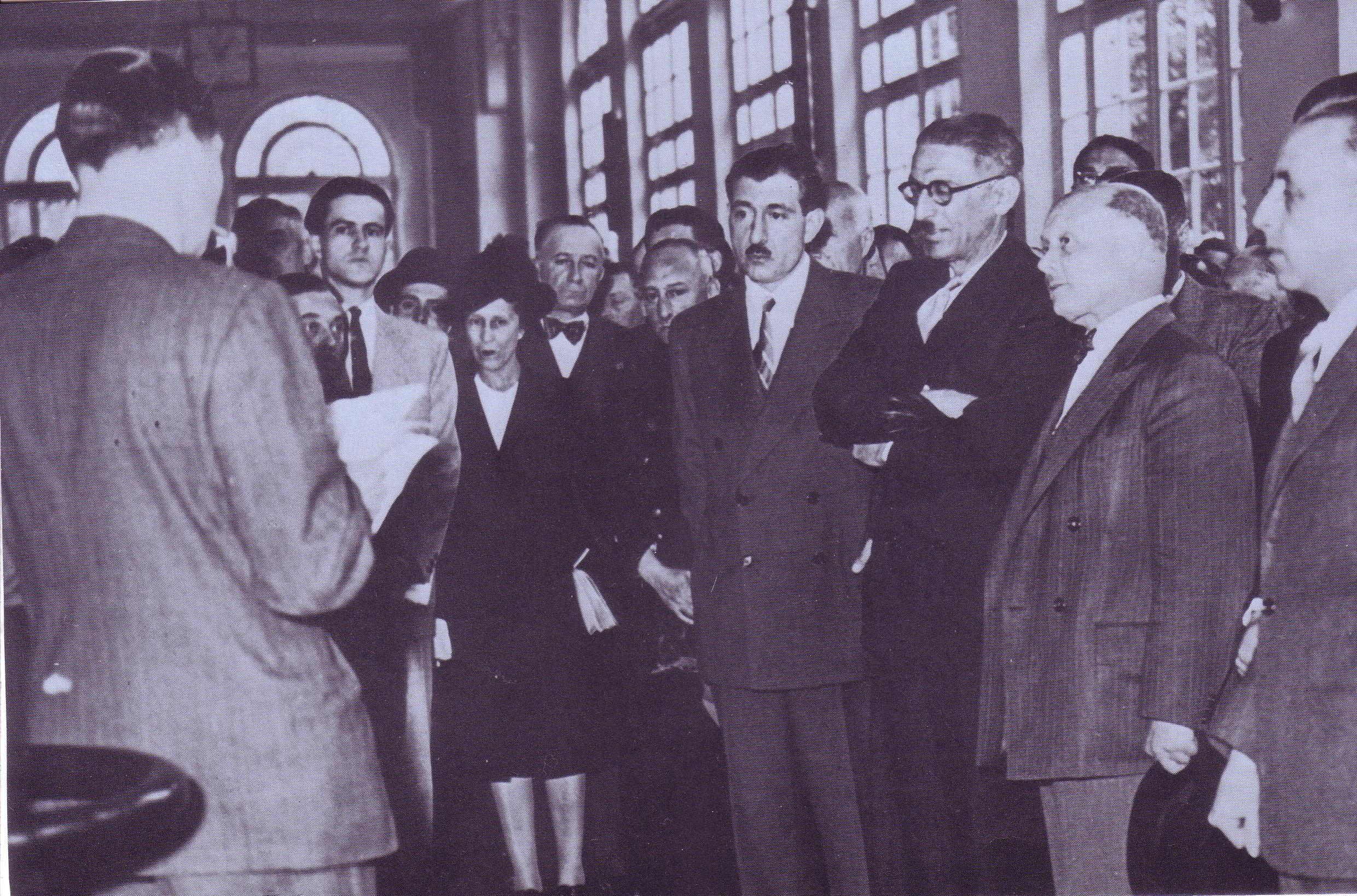
Hymans (4th from the right) at the inauguration of the Aérogare des Invalides
