= French Socialist Party (1919) =

French political party (1919–35)

French Socialist Party Parti socialiste français
- Abbreviation: PSF
- Founder: Arthur Levasseur; Jules Aubriot; Arthur Rozier; Jacques Lauche
- Founded: March 16, 1920; 106 years ago
- Dissolved: December 1935; 90 years ago
- Split from: SFIO
- Merged into: Socialist Republican Union
- Ideology: Social democracy
- Political position: Center-left

The French Socialist Party (French: Parti socialiste français, PSF), the second political party to exist under this name, was a political party in France founded in 1919 during the Third Republic which emerged from the right wing of the French Section of the Workers' International (SFIO). The party was an early social democratic party, as opposed to the Marxist SFIO.

The party was weak and merged with the Republican-Socialist Party and the Socialist Party of France-Jean Jaurès Union to form the Socialist Republican Union (USR) in 1935. The USR participated in the Popular Front.
