= Popular Front (France) =

1936–1938 alliance of political parties in France

Popular Front Front populaire
- Leader: Maurice Thorez; Léon Blum; Camille Chautemps; Marcel Déat
- Founded: 1936
- Dissolved: 1938
- Preceded by: Lefts Cartel
- Headquarters: Paris
- Ideology: Anti-fascism; Factions: • Democratic socialism • Social democracy • Social liberalism • Communism • Radicalism
- Political position: Left-wing; Factions: Centre-left to far-left
- Colours: Red

The Popular Front (French: Front populaire [fʁɔ̃ pɔpylɛːʁ]) was an alliance of left-wing movements in France, including the French Communist Party (PCF), the socialist SFIO and the Radical-Socialist Republican Party, during the interwar period. Three months after the victory of the Spanish Popular Front, the Popular Front won the May 1936 legislative election, leading to the formation of a government first headed by SFIO leader Léon Blum and composed of republican and SFIO ministers.

Blum's government implemented various social reforms. The workers' movement welcomed this electoral victory by launching a general strike in May–June 1936, resulting in the negotiation of the Matignon Agreements, one of the cornerstones of social rights in France. All employees were assured a two-week paid vacation, and the rights of unions were strengthened. The socialist movement's euphoria was apparent in SFIO member Marceau Pivert's "Tout est possible!" (Everything is possible). However, the economy continued to stall, with 1938 production still not having recovered to 1929 levels, and higher wages had been neutralized by inflation. Businessmen took their funds overseas. Blum was forced to stop his reforms and devalue the franc. With the French Senate controlled by conservatives, Blum lost power in June 1937. The presidency of the cabinet was then taken over by Camille Chautemps, a Radical-Socialist, but Blum came back as President of the Council in March 1938, before being succeeded by Édouard Daladier, another Radical-Socialist, the next month. The Popular Front dissolved itself in autumn 1938, confronted by internal dissensions related to the Spanish Civil War (1936–1939), opposition of the right-wing, and the persistent effects of the Great Depression.

After one year of major activity, it lost its spirit by June 1937 and could only temporize as the European crisis worsened. The Socialists were forced out; only the Radical-Socialists and smaller left-republican parties were left. It failed to live up to the expectations of the left. The workers obtained major new rights, but their 48 percent increase in wages was offset by a 46 percent rise in prices. Unemployment remained high, and overall industrial production was stagnant. Industry had great difficulty adjusting to the imposition of a 40-hour workweek, which caused serious disruptions while France was desperately trying to catch up with Germany in military production. France joined other nations and bitterly disappointed many French leftists in refusing to help the Spanish Republicans in the Spanish Civil War, partly because the right threatened another civil war in France itself.

== Background ==
General election of 3 May 1936

There are various reasons for the formation of the Popular Front and its subsequent electoral victory, including the economic crisis caused by the Great Depression, which affected France starting in 1931, financial scandals and the instability of the Chamber of Deputies elected in 1932 that had weakened the ruling parties, the rise of Adolf Hitler in Nazi Germany, the growth of violent far-right leagues in France and in general of fascist-related parties and organisations (Marcel Bucard's Mouvement Franciste, which was subsidised by Italian leader Benito Mussolini, Neosocialism etc.)

The elections of 1932 had resulted in a victory for the two largest parties of the left, the Marxist SFIO and the Radical-Socialist PRRRS, as well as several smaller parties ideologically close to Radicalism (an electoral pact known as the Cartel des Gauches); the Communist Party had run on its own, accusing the Socialists of social-fascism and opposing the subsequent centre-left governments. However, major differences between the SFIO and PRRRS prevented them from forming a cabinet together, as all had expected, leaving France governed by a series of short-lived cabinets formed exclusively of the six Radical parties.

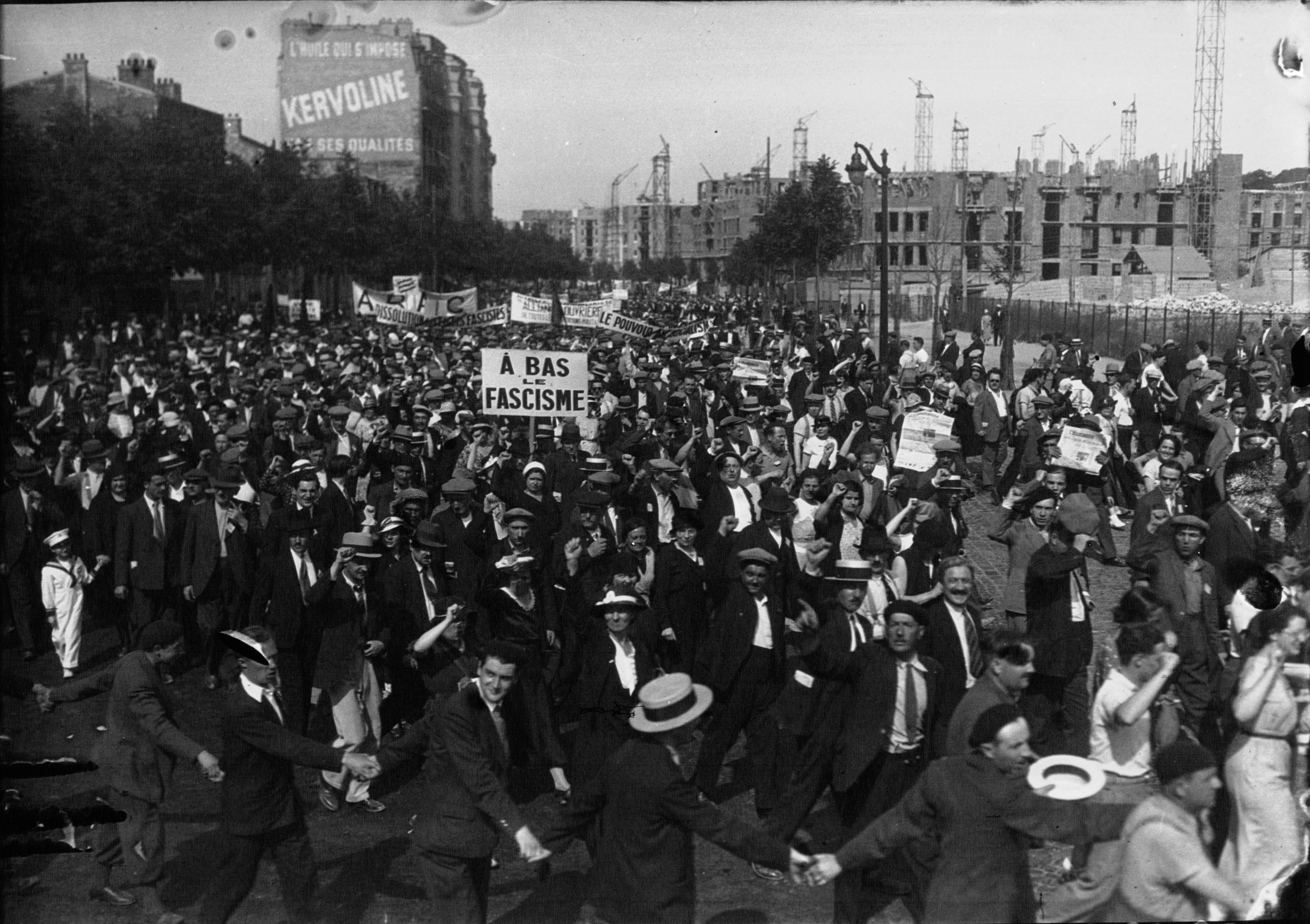
SFIO demonstration in response to the 6 February 1934 crisis. A sign reads "Down with fascism"

The Socialist Party reliably granted its confidence to these cabinets but fundamentally disagreed with their budget cuts, and the various small liberal centre-right parties who agreed with the budget cuts refused to support centre-left governments in which they were not represented. With government paralyzed, tensions grew greater and greater both between the different parties in parliament and within public opinion. The tensions finally erupted into the infamous 6 February 1934 crisis in which massive riots by authoritarian paramilitary leagues caused the collapse of the Cartel. The Radical-Socialists and other republican centre-left parties accepted entry into a government dominated by the centre-right (the liberal conservative Democratic Alliance) and hard right (the Catholic conservative Republican Federation). The support by extreme-right paramilitaries for the National Unity government alarmed the left, which feared that plans to reform the constitution would lead to the abandonment of parliamentary government for an authoritarian regime, as had recently occurred in other European democracies.

The idea of a "Popular Front" therefore came simultaneously from three directions:

- The frustration felt by many moderate Socialists and left-wing Radical-Socialists at the collapse of their previous attempts at government and an increasing desire to rebuild that coalition on a stronger basis to combat the economic crisis of the Great Depression
- The left-wing view that the 6 February 1934 riots had represented a deliberate attempt by the French far right for a coup d'état against the Republic
- The Comintern's alarm at the increased popularity of fascist and authoritarian right-wing regimes in Europe, and decision to abandon its hostile position towards social-democracy and parliamentarianism (see Third Period) in favour of the "Popular Front" position. This advocated an alliance with the social-democrats and authentically democratic middle-class republicans against the greater threat of the far-right.

Thus, antifascism became the order of the day for a growing number of Communists, Socialists and Republicans as a result of a convergence of influences: the collapse of the centre-left coalition of 1932, the fear of the consequences of the 1934 riots and the broader European policy of the Comintern. Maurice Thorez, secretary general of the SFIC, was the first to call for the formation of a "Popular Front", first in the party press organ L'Humanité in 1934 and then in the Chamber of Deputies. The Radical-Socialists were at the time the largest party in the Chamber, and had often been the dominant party of government during the second half of the Third Republic.

Beside the three main left-wing parties, Radical-Socialists, SFIO and PCF, the Popular Front was supported by several other parties and associations.

These included several civil society organisations, chief among whom were:

- The Confédération générale du travail (CGT) or General Confederation of Labour, a syndicalist trade-union confederation distinct from the Socialist and Communist parties;
- The Ligue des droits de l'homme (LDH) or League of Human Rights, a civil rights watchdog formed during the Dreyfus Affair;
- The Movement Against War and Fascism, a left-wing anti-war association that fell within the Communist sphere of influence;
- The Comité de vigilance des intellectuels antifascistes (CVIA) or Vigilance Committee of Antifascist Intellectuals, a watchdog created in 1934 to organise resistance against a far-right takeover of the democratic regime.

The Communist, Socialist and Radical-Socialist parties were also joined by several smaller parties, mostly formed by dissidents who in previous years had exited the main three parties:

- The Socialist Republican Union (USR), a social-democratic republican party led by Paul Ramadier, Marcel Déat and Joseph Paul-Boncour. This had been formed by the fusion of the SFIO's right-wing with the left wing of the middle-class republicans;
- The Party of Proletarian Unity (PUP), a dissident Leninist party created in 1930 and opposed both to social democracy and to the Third International;
- The Frontist Party (PF), a small anti-fascist splinter of the Radical-Socialist Party formed by Gaston Bergery in 1933;
- The Radical-Socialist Party Camille Pelletan (PRS-CP), a small anti-fascist splinter of the Radical-Socialist Party formed in May 1934 by Gabriel Cudenet;
- The Young Republic League (PJR) or Young Republic party, a small Catholic anti-war party formed by Marc Sangnier;

== May 1936 elections and the formation of the Blum government ==
The Popular Front won the general election of 3 May 1936, with 386 seats out of 608. For the first time, the Socialists won more seats than the Radical-Socialists, and the Socialist leader, Léon Blum, became the first Socialist Prime Minister of France and the first Jew to hold that office. The first Popular Front cabinet consisted of 20 Socialists, 13 Radical-Socialists and two Socialist Republicans (there were no Communist Ministers) and, for the first time, included three women (who were then not able to vote in France).

The members of the Popular Front parties too small to form their own parliamentary grouping (the PUP, PF, PRS-CP and PJR) joined with several independents to sit together as the Independent Left (Gauche indépendante) parliamentary caucus.

== In government ==
=== Labor laws ===
Through the 1936 Matignon Accords, the Popular Front government introduced new labor laws that did the following:

- created the right to strike
- created collective bargaining
- enacted the law mandating 12 days (two weeks) of paid annual leave for workers
- enacted the law limiting the working week to 40 hours; overtime was prohibited
- raised workers' wages (15% for the lowest-paid and 7% for the relatively well-paid)
- stipulated that employers would recognise shop stewards
- ensured that there would be no retaliation against strikers

The government sought to carry out its reforms as rapidly as possible. On 11 June, the Chamber of Deputies voted for the forty-hour workweek, the restoration of civil servants' salaries, and two weeks' paid holidays, by a majority of 528 to 7. The Senate voted in favour of these laws within a week.

=== Domestic reforms ===
The Blum administration democratised the Bank of France by enabling all shareholders to attend meetings and set up a new council with more representation from government. By mid-August the parliament had passed:

- the creation of a national Office du blé (Grain Board or Wheat Office, through which the government helped to market agricultural produce at fair prices for farmers) to stabilise prices and curb speculation
- the nationalisation of the arms industries
- loans to small and medium-sized industries
- the raising of the compulsory school-leaving age to 14 years
- measures against illicit price rises
- a major public works program

The legislative pace of the Popular Front government meant that before parliament went into recess, it had passed 133 laws within the space of 73 days, a pace of nearly two enactments a day.

Other measures carried out by the Popular Front government improved the pay, pensions, allowances, and taxes of public-sector workers and ex-servicemen. The 1920 sales tax, opposed by the Left as a tax on consumers, was abolished and replaced by a production tax, which was considered to be a tax on the producer instead of the consumer. The government also made some administrative changes to the civil service, such as a new director-general for the Paris police and a new governor for the Bank of France. In addition, a secretariat for sports and leisure was established, and opportunities for the children of workers and peasants in secondary education were increased. In 1937, careers guidance classes (classes d'orientation) were established in some lycées as a means of helping pupils to make a better choice of their subsequent course of secondary schooling. Secondary education was made free to all pupils; previously, it had been closed to the poor, who were unable to afford to pay tuition.

In aviation, a decree in December 1936 established a psycho-physiological service for military aviation "with the task of centralising the study of the adaptation of the human system to the optimum utilisation of aeronautical material." A Decree of 12 July 1936 extended compensation to cover diseases contracted in sewers, skin diseases due to the action of cement, dermatitis due to the action of trichloronaphthaline (acne), and cutaneous and nasal ulceration from potassium bichromate. An Act of August 1936 extended to workers in general supplementary allowances that had previously been confined to workers injured in accidents prior to 9 January 1927. An order dealing with rescue equipment in mines was issued on 19 August 1936, followed by two orders concerning packing and caving on 25 February 1937. In relation to maritime transport, a Decree of 3 March 1937 issued instructions concerning safety. A decree of 18 June 1937 promulgated the Convention "concerning the marking of the weight on heavy packages transported by vessels which was adopted by the International Labour Conference at Geneva in 1929".

In October 1936, the government ratified a League of Nations Convention dating back to October 1933, which granted Nansen refugees "travel and identity documents that afforded them protection against arbitrary refoulement and expulsion." The Walter-Paulin Law of March 1937 set standards for apprenticeship teachers and set up a corps of salaried inspectors, while a decree of June 1937 decided on the "creation of the workshop schools, close to schools [...] that should awaken the skills and curiosity of students, open up more to life school work, let them know about the local history and geography." In June 1937, holiday camps ('colonies') received a nationwide public statute through their first comprehensive state regulation.

An act of 26 August 1936 that amended the social insurance scheme for commerce and industry raised the maximum daily maternity benefit from 18 to 22 francs, and an order of 13 February 1937 prescribed a special sound signal for road-rail coaches. Improvements were made in unemployment allowances, and an Act of August 1936 increased the rate of pensions and allowances payable to miners and their dependents. In August 1936, regulations extending the provisions of the Family Allowances Act to agriculture were signed into law. A decree was introduced that same month for the inspection of farm dwellings, and at the beginning of January 1937, an Advisory Committee on Rents was appointed by decree. To promote profit-sharing, an Act of January 1937 (that regulated the working of the State mines, the Alsatian potash mines, and the potash industry), provided that 10% of the net yield of the undertaking "must be set aside, to be used, at least to the extent of one half, to enable the staff to share in the profits of the industry."

Blum persuaded the workers to accept pay raises and go back to work, ending the massive wave of strikes that disrupted production in 1936. Wages increased sharply, in two years the national average was up 48 percent. However inflation also rose 46%. The imposition of the 40-hour week proved highly inefficient, as industry had a difficult time adjusting to it. At the end of 40 hours, a shop or small factory had to shut down or replace its best workers; unions refused to compromise on this issue. The limitation was ended by the Radicals in 1938. The economic confusion hindered the rearmament effort; the rapid growth of German armaments alarmed Blum. He launched a major program to speed up arms production. The cost forced the abandonment of the social reform programs that the Popular Front had counted heavily on.

=== Far right ===
Blum dissolved the far-right leagues. In turn, the Popular Front was actively fought by right-wing and far-right movements, which often used antisemitic slurs against Blum and other Jewish ministers. The Cagoule far-right group even staged bombings to disrupt the government.

=== Spanish Civil War ===
The Spanish Civil War broke out in July 1936 and deeply divided the government, which tried to remain neutral. The French left massively supported the Republican government in Madrid, and the right mostly supported the Nationalist insurgents, some even threatening to bring the war to France. Blum's cabinet was also deeply divided. Fear of the war spreading to France was one factor that made him decide on a policy of non-intervention. He collaborated with Britain and 25 other countries to formalize an agreement against sending any munitions or volunteer soldiers to Spain.

The air minister defied the cabinet and secretly sold warplanes to Madrid. Jackson concludes that the French government "was virtually paralyzed by the menace of Civil War at home, the German danger abroad, and the weakness of her own defenses." The Republicans in Spain found themselves increasingly on the defensive, and over 500,000 political refugees crossed the border into France, where they lived for years in refugee camps.

=== Collapse ===
After 1937, the precarious coalition went into its death throes with rising extremism on left and right, as well as bitter recriminations. The economy remained stagnant, and French policy became helpless in the face of rapid growth of the German threat.

By 1938, the Radicals had taken control and forced the Socialists out of the cabinet. In late 1938, the Communists broke with the coalition by voting against the Munich agreement, in which the Popular Front had joined with the British by handing over part of Czechoslovakia to Germany. The government denounced the Communists as warmongers, who provoked large-scale strikes in late 1938. The Radical government crushed the Communists and fired over 800,000 workers. In effect, the Radical Party stood alone.

== Cultural policies ==
Radical cultural ideas came to the fore in the era of the Popular Front and often were explicitly supported by the governments, as in the 1937 Exposition Internationale des Arts et Techniques dans la Vie Moderne.

An "art for the masses" movement flourished, led by efforts of three of the most influential art magazines to legitimize a visual imagery: Cahiers d'art, Minotaure, and Verve. The prevailing leftist anti-capitalist discourse against social inequality was a feature of the Popular Front cultural policy.

The government proposed a draft law concerning intellectual property right, based on a new philosophy that did not consider the author as an "owner" (propriétaire) but as an "intellectual worker" (travailleur intellectuel). However, the draft failed to pass.

== New communist positions ==
The new cross-class coalition of the Popular Front forced the Communists to accept some bourgeois cultural norms that they had long ridiculed. These included patriotism, the veterans' sacrifice, the honor of being an army officer, the prestige of the bourgeois, and the leadership of the Socialist Party and the parliamentary Republic. Above all, the Communists portrayed themselves as French nationalists. Young Communists dressed in costumes from the revolutionary period and the scholars glorified the Jacobins as heroic predecessors.

The Communists in the 1920s saw the need to mobilize young women but saw them as auxiliaries to male organizations. The 1930s had a new model of a separate-but-equal role for women. The party set up the Union des Jeunes Filles de France (UJFF) to appeal to young working women through publications and activities that were geared to their interests. The party discarded its original notions of Communist femininity and female political activism as a gender-neutral revolutionary. It issued a new model more attuned to the mood of the late 1930s and one more acceptable to the middle class elements of the Popular Front. It now portrayed the ideal young Communist woman as a paragon of moral probity with her commitment to marriage and motherhood and gender-specific public activism.

== Sports and leisure ==
With the 1936 Matignon Accords, the working class gained the right to two weeks' vacation a year for the first time. This signaled the beginning of tourism in France. Although beach resorts had long existed, they had been restricted to the upper class. Tens of thousands of families who had never seen the sea before now played in the waves, and Léo Lagrange arranged around 500,000 discounted rail trips and hotel accommodation on a massive scale. However, the Popular Front's policy on leisure was limited to the enactment of the two-week vacation. While this measure was thought of as a response to workers' alienation, the Popular Front gave Lagrange (SFIO), named Under-Secretary for Sports and the organisation of Leisure, responsibility for organizing the use this leisure time with priority to sports.

The fascist conception and use of sport as a means to an end contrasted with the SFIO's official stance, which had ridiculed sports as a bourgeois and reactionary activity. However, confronted with an increasing possibility of war with Nazi Germany and affected by the scientific racist theories of the time, which were common beyond the fascist parties, the SFIO began to change its ideas concerning sports during the Popular Front, because its social reforms permitted to the workers' to participate in such leisure activities and also because of the increasing risks of a confrontation with Nazi Germany, particularly after the March 1936 remilitarization of the Rhineland. That new sign of German's revisionism towards the conditions of the 1919 Treaty of Versailles violated the 1925 Locarno Treaties, which had been reaffirmed in 1935 by France, Britain and Italy, allied in the Stresa Front. That led parts of the SFIO in supporting a conception of sport used as a training field for future conscription and, eventually, war.

The complex situation did not stop Lagrange from holding fast to an ethical conception of sports that rejected fascist militarism and indoctrination, scientific racist theories and the professionalisation of sports, which he opposed as an elitist conception that ignored the main popular aspect of sport. He considered that sport should aim for the fulfilment of the personality of the individual. Thus, Lagrange stated, "It cannot be a question in a democratic country of militarizing the distractions and the pleasures of the masses and of transforming the joy skillfully distributed into a means of not thinking." Léo Lagrange further declared in 1936:

"Our simple and human goal is to allow the masses of French youth to find in the practice of sport, joy and health and to build an organization of the leisure activities so that the workers can find relaxation and a reward to their hard labour."

Langrange also explained:

"We want to make our youth healthy and happy. Hitler has been very clever at that sort of thing, and there is no reason why a democratic government should not do the same."

Thus, as shown by the hierarchy of the ministers, which placed the sub-secretary of sport under the authority of the Minister of Public Health, sport was considered above all as a public health issue. From this principle, it was only one step to relating sport to the "degeneration of the race" and other scientific racist theories. It was done by Georges Barthélémy, deputy of the SFIO, who declared that sports contributed to the "improvement of relations between capital and labour, henceforth to the elimination of the concept of class struggle" and that they were a "means to prevent the moral and physical degeneration of the race."

Such corporatist conceptions had led to the neo-socialist movement, whose members had been excluded from the SFIO on 5 November 1933. However, scientific racist positions were upheld inside the SFIO and the Radical-Socialist Party, who supported colonialism and found in this discourse a perfect ideological alibi to justify colonial rule. After all, Georges Vacher de Lapouge (1854–1936), a leading theorist of scientific racism, had been a SFIO member, although he was strongly opposed to the "Teachers' Republic" (République des instituteurs) and its meritocratic ideal of individual advancement and fulfillment through education, a Republican ideal founded on the philosophy of the Enlightenment.

=== 1936 Olympic Games ===
The International Olympic Committee chose Berlin over Barcelona for the 1936 Olympic Games. In protest against holding the event in a fascist country, the Spanish Popular Front, decided to organize rival games in Barcelona, under the name People's Olympiad. Blum's government at first decided to take part in it, on insistence from the PCF, but the games were never held because the Spanish Civil War broke out.

Léo Lagrange played a major role in the co-organisation of the People's Olympiad. The trials for these Olympiads proceeded on 4 July 1936 in the Pershing stadium in Paris. Through their club, the FSGT, or individually, 1,200 French athletes were registered with these anti-fascist Olympiads.

However, Blum finally decided not to vote for the funds to pay the athletes' expenses. A PCF deputy declared: "Going to Berlin is making oneself an accomplice of the torturers...." Nevertheless, on 9 July, when the whole of the French right wing voted for the participation of France in the Olympic Games of Berlin, the left wing (PCF included) abstained. The motion passed, and France participated at Berlin.

=== 1937 Million Franc Race ===
In 1937, the Popular Front organized the Million Franc Race to induce automobile manufacturers to develop race cars capable of competing with the German Mercedes-Benz and Auto Union racers of the time, which were backed by the Nazi government as part of its sports policy. Hired by Delahaye, René Dreyfus beat Jean-Pierre Wimille, who ran for Bugatti. Wimille would later take part in the Resistance. The next year, Dreyfus succeeded in overwhelming the legendary Rudolf Caracciola, and his 480 horsepower (360 kW) Silver Arrow at the Pau Grand Prix, becoming a national hero.

== Colonial policy ==
The Popular Front initiated the 1936 Blum-Viollette proposal, which was supposed to grant French citizenship to a minority of Algerian Muslims. Opposed both by colons and by Messali Hadj's pro-independence party, the project was never submitted to the National Assembly's vote and was abandoned.

== Legacy ==
Many historians judge the Popular Front to be a failure in terms of economics, foreign policy and long-term stability. "Disappointment and failure," says Jackson, "was the legacy of the Popular Front." Philippe Bernard and Henri Dubief concluded, "The Front Populaire came to grief through its own economic ineffectiveness and because of external pressures over which it had no control." There is general agreement that at first it created enormous excitement and expectation on the left, but in the end, it failed to live up to its promise. There is also general agreement, that the Popular Front provided a set of lessons and even an inspiration for the future. It began a process of government intervention into economic affairs that grew rapidly during the Vichy and postwar regimes into the modern French welfare state.

Charles Sowerwine argues that the Popular Front was above all a coalition against fascism, and it succeeded in blocking the arrival of fascism in France until 1940. He adds that it "failed to make the great changes its supporters anticipated and left many ordinary French people deeply disillusioned."

The reasons for the failure continue to be debated. Many historians blame Blum for being too timid and thereby dissolving the revolutionary fervor of the workers. MacMillan says that Blum "Lacked the inner convictions that he was the man to resolve the country's problems by bold and imaginative leadership," leading him to avoid a showdown with the financial powers, and forfeiting the support of the working class.

Other scholars blame the complex coalition of Socialist and Radicals, who never really agreed on labor policy. Others point to the Communists, who refused to turn the general strike into a revolution, as well as their refusal to join the government. From the perspective of the far left, "The failure of the Popular Front government was the failure of the parliamentary system," says Allen Douglas.

Economic historians point to numerous bad financial and economic policies, such as delayed devaluation of the franc, which made French exports uncompetitive. Economists especially consider the bad effects of the 40-hour week, which made overtime illegal, forcing employers to choose whether stop work or to replace their best workers with inferior and inexperienced workers when 40 hours had been reached. More generally, the argument is made that France could not afford the labor reforms in the face of poor economic conditions, the fears of the business community, and the threat of Nazi Germany. The forty hour week was particularly problematic in light of German weapons production - France was trying to compete with a nation which not only had a larger population but one which was working fifty to sixty hour work weeks. The limits on working hours particularly limited aircraft production, weakening French aviation and thus encouraging concessions at the Munich Agreement.

== Composition of Léon Blum's government (June 1936 – June 1937) ==
- "SFIO" refers to membership to the French Section of the Workers' International, while RAD refers to membership to the Radical-Socialist Party. The French Communist Party (PCF) restricted itself to a "support without participation" of the government (meaning it took part to the parliamentary majority but did not have any ministers). The Popular Front government coincides with its leadership by Léon Blum, from 5 June 1936 to 21 June 1937.
- Léon Blum (SFIO), President of the Council
- Édouard Daladier (RAD), Vice-President of the Council and Minister of War and of National Defence
- Camille Chautemps (RAD) – Minister of State
- Paul Faure (SFIO) – Minister of State
- Maurice Viollette (USR) – Minister of State
- Yvon Delbos (RAD), Minister of Foreign Affairs
- Roger Salengro (SFIO), Minister of Interior
- Vincent Auriol (SFIO), Minister of Finances
- Charles Spinasse (SFIO), Minister of National Economy
- Marc Rucart (RAD), Minister of Justice
- Jean-Baptiste Lebas (SFIO), Minister of Labour
- Alphonse Gasnier-Duparc – Minister of Marine
- Pierre Cot (RAD) – Minister of Air
- Jean Zay (RAD) – Minister of National Education
- Albert Rivière (SFIO) – Minister of Pensions
- Georges Monnet (RAD) – Minister of Agriculture
- Marius Moutet (SFIO) – Minister of Colonies
- Albert Bedouce (SFIO) – Minister of Public Works
- Henri Sellier (SFIO) – Minister of Public Health
- Robert Jardillier (SFIO) – Minister of Posts, Telegraphs, and Telephones (PTT)
- Paul Bastid (RAD) – Minister of Commerce
- Léo Lagrange (SFIO), Under-Secretary of State for Leisure and Sports (under the authority of the Minister of Public Health)
- On 18 November 1936, Marx Dormoy (SFIO) replaced Roger Salengro at the Interior, following the latter's suicide.

== See also ==
- French Left
- Matignon Agreements (1936)
- Popular Front (Senegal)
- New Popular Front
