= Marcel Déat =

French socialist turned fascist politician

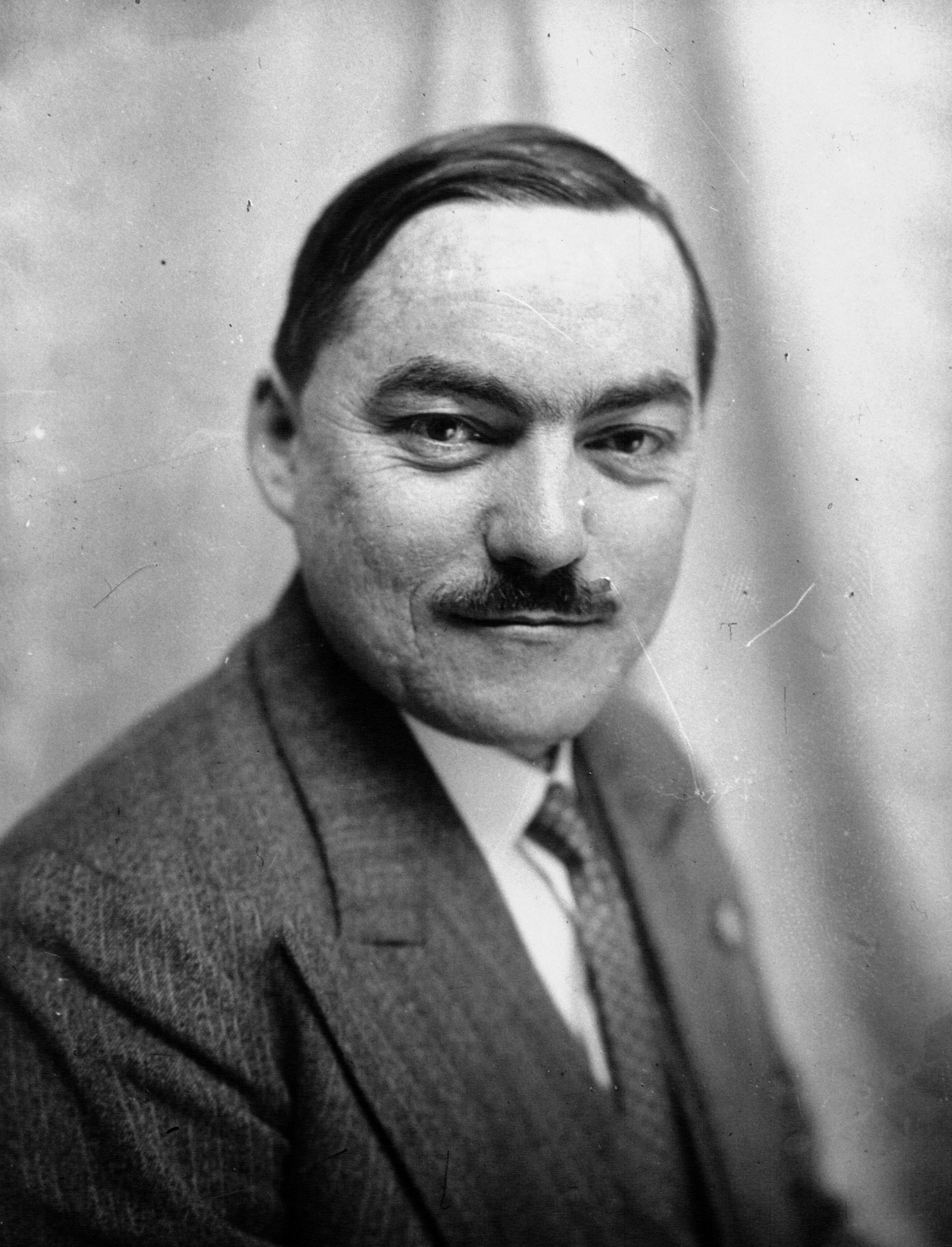
- Déat in 1932

Minister of Air
- In office 24 January 1936 – 4 June 1936
- Prime Minister: Albert Sarraut
- Preceded by: Victor Denain
- Succeeded by: Pierre Cot

Member of the French Chamber of Deputies
- In office 1939 – 10 July 1940
- Constituency: Charente
- In office 9 May 1932 – 3 May 1936
- Constituency: Seine
- In office 1926 – 29 April 1928
- Constituency: Marne

Personal details
- Born: 7 March 1894 Guérigny, France
- Died: 5 January 1955 (aged 60) Turin, Italy
- Party: French Section of the Workers' International (1914–1933); Socialist Party of France (1933–1935); Socialist Republican Union (1935–1940); National Popular Rally (1941–1944)
- Education: École Normale Supérieure
- Profession: Journalist, writer

Marcel Déat (French pronunciation: [maʁsɛl dea]; 7 March 1894 – 5 January 1955) was a French politician. Initially a socialist and a member of the French Section of the Workers' International (SFIO), he led a breakaway group of right-wing Neosocialists out of the SFIO in 1933. During the occupation of France by Nazi Germany, he founded the collaborationist National Popular Rally (RNP). In 1944, he became Minister of Labour and National Solidarity in Pierre Laval's government in Vichy, before escaping to the Sigmaringen enclave along with Vichy officials after the Allied landings in Normandy. Condemned in absentia for collaborationism, he died while still in hiding in Italy.

== Early life and politics ==
Marcel Déat was raised in a modest environment, which shared republican and patriotic values. After brilliant studies, he entered in 1914 the École Normale Supérieure (ENS) after having been the student of Alain, a philosopher who was active in the Radical Party and who would write a deeply anti-militarist book after World War I. The same year, Déat joined the SFIO.

While he attended the ENS and worked to get a philosophy degree, World War I broke out. He joined the French Army and saw active duty, winning the Légion d'honneur and five bravery citations. By the war's end, Déat had achieved the rank of captain. Under the pseudonym of Taëd, he then published Cadavres et maximes, philosophie d'un revenant (approximately translated by "Corpses and Maxims, Philosophy of a Ghost"), in which he expressed his horror of trenches, strong pacifist views, as well as his fascination for collective discipline and war camaraderie. When the war ended in 1918, he finished his studies at the École Normale and passed his agrégation of philosophy, and oriented himself towards sociology under the direction of Célestin Bouglé, a friend of Alain and also member of the Radical Party. In the meanwhile, Déat taught philosophy in Reims.

During the 1920 Tours Congress in which a majority of the SFIO decided to spin off to found the French Communist Party, Marcel Déat positioned himself at the right wing of the SFIO, taking part in the groupe de la Vie socialiste current, alongside Pierre Renaudel. Déat was elected municipal counsellor of Reims in 1925, and then deputy for the Marne during a partial election in 1926. However, he lost his seat after the 1928 elections. In these times, Léon Blum, the leader of the SFIO, tried to favor youths in the party, and decided to name Déat secretary of the SFIO parliamentary group. After having been put in charge of the documentary center of the ENS by Célestin Bouglié, Déat now founded a documentary center for the SFIO deputies.

== Neo-socialist period ==
Marcel Déat published in 1930 Perspectives socialistes (Socialist Perspectives), a revisionist work closely influenced by Henri de Man's planisme. Along with over a hundred articles written in La Vie Socialiste, the review of the SFIO's right-wing, Perspective socialistes marked the shift of Déat from classical socialism to neosocialism. Déat replaced class struggle by collaboration of classes and national solidarity, advocated corporatism as a social organization model, replaced the notion of "socialism" by "anti-capitalism" and supported an authoritarian state which would plan the economy and from which parliamentarism would be repealed.

During the 1932 elections, he was elected deputy of the 20th arrondissement of Paris, beating the Communist Jacques Duclos — who himself had gained the upper hand against Léon Blum in 1928 in the same electoral district. Déat and other Neosocialists were expelled from the SFIO at the 5 November 1933 Congress, for their revisionist views and disagreements with Léon Blum's policies toward Prime Minister Édouard Herriot, leader of the second Cartel des Gauches (Left-Wing Coalition). The official position of the SFIO was then to support the Cartel without participating in the government, which it considered "bourgeois." The same year, Déat joined the Socialist Party of France – Jean Jaurès Union (PSdF) created the same year by Planist and Neosocialist elements expelled by the SFIO during the 1933 Congress. The new party's slogan was "Order, Authority and Nation".

The expelled faction was a minority in the SFIO, but represented the majority of the SFIO parliamentary group. They were opposed both by the left wing of the SFIO, represented by Marceau Pivert, and by the SFIO's center, headed by Blum. The Neosocialists wanted to "reinforce the state against the economic crisis", open themselves to the middle classes and participate in non-Socialist governments. Without the support of the Socialists, Déat lost his seat in the Chamber. Two years later, he joined the Socialist Republican Union (USR). He became Minister of Air in the "bourgeois" government of Albert Sarraut (Radical) but he quickly resigned his post over disputes with the Prime Minister. With the increasing threats represented by Nazi Germany, Déat wanted to maintain peace at any cost.

He returned to the Chamber of Deputies in 1936 as a delegate from Angoulême, and at first supported the Popular Front led by Blum before denouncing "Communist infiltration" of it. After Blum's replacement by Édouard Daladier in 1938, which marked the end of the Popular Front, Déat participated in the "Anti-Communist Rally." In an article published on 4 May 1939 entitled Why Die for Danzig?, published in the newspaper L'Œuvre, Déat argued that France should not go to war for Poland if the Danzig crisis resulted in war. There, he argued that France should avoid war with Germany if the latter seized Poland – the publication caused a widespread controversy, and propelled Déat to national fame. Déat would collaborate with L'Œuvre during the entire period of Vichy France.

== Roots of extremism ==
A strong supporter of Germany's occupation of northern France in 1940, Déat took up residence in unoccupied France, and was initially a supporter of Philippe Pétain. He attempted to create a single party to fully realize the aims of the "Révolution nationale", the official, reactionary ideology of Vichy. Thereafter, he founded in February 1941 the National Popular Rally (RNP) which advocated collaboration with Nazi Germany and antisemitism. When the French State, then headed by Pétain, did not become the Fascist state Déat had in mind, he moved to occupied Paris and was funded by the Germans. The Germans forced Déat at first to merge his new party (RNP) with Eugène Deloncle's MSR (Social Revolutionary Movement), a far-right party, the successor of the Cagoule terrorist group. The merger was a failure and Déat later expelled MSR elements from his party, before trying to form a unified front of Collaborationist parties.

Déat founded, along with fellow collaborationists Jacques Doriot and Marcel Bucard, the Légion des Volontaires Français (LVF), a French unit of the Wehrmacht (later affiliated with the Waffen-SS). While reviewing troops from the LVF with former Prime Minister Pierre Laval in Versailles on 27 August 1941, Déat was wounded in an assassination attempt—carried out by Paul Collette. After recovering, he became a supporter of Laval, who supported more reactionary policies than Pétain, and again became Prime Minister of France in 1942. Under the suggestion of the Germans, Marcel Déat became on 16 March 1944, Minister of Labour and National Solidarity in Laval's cabinet.

== Exile and death ==
After the Allied landings at Normandy the French Government, with Déat, was escorted to Germany and he became an official of the government-in-exile at Sigmaringen. With the defeat of Nazi Germany in May 1945, Déat fled to Italy in April and took his wife's name, temporarily teaching in Milan and Turin. He was later taken in and hidden by a Roman Catholic religious order in the convent of San Vito, near Turin, where he wrote his memoirs and lived undiscovered until his death in 1955. After the war, he was convicted of treason in France and sentenced to death in absentia on 19 June 1945.

== See also ==
- French Left
- History of far-right movements in France
- Politics of France

== Works ==
- Marcel Déat, Perspectives socialistes (Paris, Valois, 1930)
- Max Bonnafous – Marcel Déat – Adrien Marquet – Barthélémy Montagnon, Néo-socialisme ? Ordre, autorité, nation, Paris, Grasset, 140 pages, 1933. Speech pronounced at the SFIO Congress of July 1933.
- Le Plan français : doctrine et plan d'action, Comité du Plan, Paris, Fasquelle, 199 pages, 1936. Preface by Marcel Déat.
- Marcel Déat, De la fausse collaboration à la vraie révolution, décembre 1941-janvier 1942, Paris, Rassemblement national populaire, 47 pages, 1942. Various articles extracted from L'Œuvre (30 December 1941 – 13 January 1942) and a conference pronounced at Radio-Paris (5 January 1942).
- Marcel Déat, Le Parti unique, Paris, Aux Armes de France, 183 pages, 1943. Articles published in L'Œuvre (18 July – 4 September 1942).
- Dominique Sordet (ed.), Le Coup du 13 décembre, Paris, impr. de Guillemot et de Lamothe, 47 pages, 1943. Article by Marcel Déat : "Il faut les chasser".
- Marcel Déat, Mémoires politiques, Paris, Denoël, 990 pages, 1989. Introduction & notes by Laurent Theis; epilogue by Hélène Déat.
- Marcel Déat, Discours, articles et témoignages, Coulommiers, Éd. Déterna, " Documents pour l'histoire ", 149 pages, 1999.
