= Pierre Renaudel =

French politician and journalist

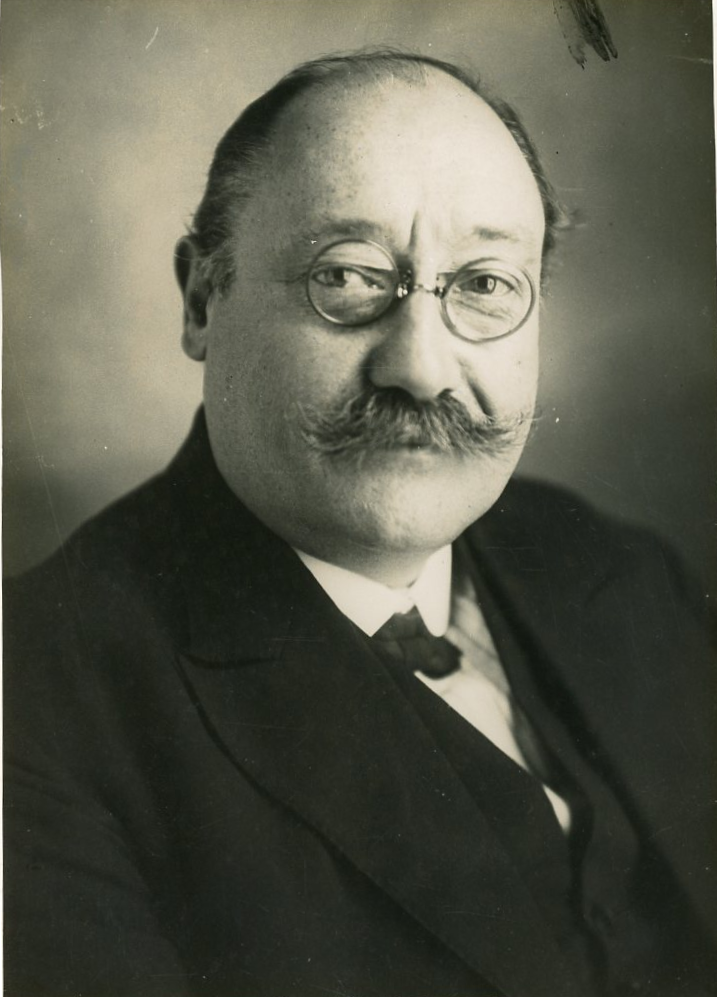
- Born: 19 December 1871; Morgny-la-Pommeraye, Seine-Maritime, France
- Died: 1 April 1935 (aged 63); Sóller, Mallorca, Spain
- Occupation: Politician
- Political party: French Section of the Workers' International; Socialist Party of France - Jean Jaurès Union

Pierre Renaudel (19 December 1871 – 1 April 1935) was a French socialist politician and journalist.

== Biography ==
He served as central committee member of the League of Human Rights (Ligue des droits de l'homme, LDH), was a founder and majoritaire of the Socialist Party of France (PSdF). He urged the party to work with the Radicals and wanted the party to build coalition cabinets as he felt the alternative, would be instability and reaction. Renaudel was a member of the Chamber of Deputies, and a national leader of the French Section of the Workers' International (Section Française de l'Internationale Ouvrière, SFIO). He was editor of the daily newspaper L'Humanité; and was the founder and political editor of the socialist weekly publication, La Vie Socialiste. He was characterized as a right-wing parliamentary leader of the Socialists in the Var.

Renaudel was an editor of L'Humanité from 1914 through the end of World War I. It was said that, "his editorials of L'Humanité were frequently to be noticed for their good sense and their true democratic and Socialist tone". He became a reformist socialist spokesman, opposed to all forms of violence and Marxist ideology, which he said was absurdly rigid. Elected to the Chamber of Deputies of France in 1914, representing Var, he was defeated in 1919, but regained his seat in 1924, and was reelected in 1928 and again in 1932. He became a supporter of Socialist involvement in radical government leadership. In 1933, along with Marcel Déat and Adrien Marquet, he founded the PSdF, but after having disagreements with them, he resigned from the presidency of PSdF's parliamentary group. He was a member of the Central Committee of the League of Human Rights. A delegate at the 1916 International Socialist Commission Berne Conference, he was refused permission to attend the Third International.

== Partial works ==
- L'Internationale à Berne : faits et documents (1899)
- Pour le socialisme arguments. Préface d'A. Cipriani (1903)
- Jean Jaurès : un anniversaire (1917)
- Pour la paix du peuples discours prononcé à la Chambre les 25 et 26 septembre 1919 (1919)
- La Situation des Juifs en Pologne, rapport de la commission d'étude désignée par la Conférence socialiste internationale de Lucerne. Pierre Renaudel, secrétaire-rapporteur. (1920)
- Pour un programme d'action pour l'unité internationale (1920)
- L'indépendance de la Géorgie et la politique internationale du bolchevisme; discours prononcé á la Chambre des députés le jeudi 29 janvier 1925 dans la discussion du budget des affaires éntrangéres (1925)
- Rapport fait au nom de la Commission des finances chargée d'examiner le projet de loi portant fixation du Budget général de l'exercice 1930. (Air) Par M. Pierre Renaudel (1929)
