= Great Depression in France =

Great Depression
- 1931–1939
Années folles, World War I	World War II, Vichy France, Free France
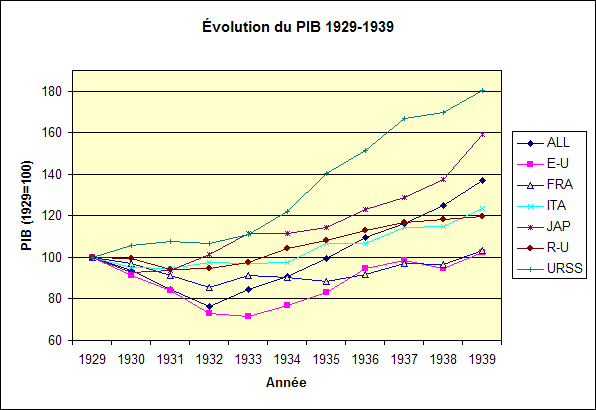
- Evolution of the gross domestic product in several countries between 1929 and 1939
- Location: France

The Great Depression in France started in about 1931 and lasted through the remainder of the decade. The crisis started in France a bit later than other countries. The 1920s economy had grown at the very strong rate of 4.43% per year, the 1930s rate fell to only 0.63%. The depression was relatively mild compared to other countries since unemployment peaked under 5%, the fall in production was at most 20% below the 1929 output and there was no banking crisis.

The banking crisis in France was driven by a flight-to-safety away from banks, which led to a severe and persistent credit crunch. However, the depression had some effects on the local economy, which can partly explain the 6 February 1934 crisis and, even more so, the formation of the Popular Front, led by the socialist SFIO and its leader, Léon Blum, who won the 1936 elections.

== 1920s economic crisis ==
Like the United Kingdom, France initially struggled to recover from the devastation of World War I and tried, without much success, to recover war reparations from Germany. However France had a more self-sufficient economy than Britain. In 1929, France seemed an island of prosperity for three reasons. One was that the country was traditionally wary of trusts and big companies. The French economy was especially founded in small and medium-sized businesses that were not financed by shares. Also, unlike the English-speaking world, particularly the United States, the French invested little on the stock exchange and put their confidence into gold, which was a currency of refuge during the crisis of 1929. Gold had played the same role in the First World War, one reason that explained the great French attachment to it. Finally, France had a positive balance of payments for some years thanks mainly to invisible exports such as tourism. French investments abroad were numerous.

The German reparations set under the terms of the Treaty of Versailles of 1919 brought in large amounts of money which served principally to repay war loans to the United States. In January 1923, Germany was declared in default on its payments, and the French prime minister, Raymond Poincaré, sent troops to occupy the Ruhr region in the hope of enforcing payment of the reparations that were in the form of materials such as coal and timber. Germany responded with a policy of passive resistance. In order to pay the idled workers, the government resorted to printing paper money, which helped fuel Germany's already high inflation towards hyperinflation. Poincaré accepted the Dawes Plan mediated by the United States in which France received smaller payments, but Poincaré's government fell soon afterward.

While the United States experienced a sharp rise in unemployment, France had almost none. Much of that was due to a simple lack of manpower; at the end of the war, France had 1,322,000 dead and three million wounded, almost 4,000,000 casualties. One in four of the dead was younger than 24. That in turn lowered the birth rate, so that by 1938 France still had only half the number of 19- to 21-year-olds it would have had had the war not happened. But whatever the causes of full employment, confidence in the government was high. The French economy was stronger than those of its neighbors, notably because of the solidarity of the franc. The introduction of the US economic model, inspired particularly by Ford, ended suddenly and, with it, the modernization of French businesses. Everything seemed to favour the French; production didn't weaken before 1930, particularly in primary materials, and the country was the world's leading producer of iron in 1930. France felt confident in its systems and proud of its vertu budgétaire, in other words the balancing of the budget, which France had managed more or less for nearly a decade.

In 1927, France gained from the world crisis in becoming the world's largest holder of gold, its reserves growing from 18 billion francs in 1927 to 80 billion in 1930.

Le Figaro said: "For our part let us rejoice in our timid yet prosperous economy as opposed to the presumptuousness and decadent economy of the Anglo-Saxon races."

== Problems of financial policy ==
There was a further contrast in the way France, the UK, and the US viewed their economies. The "Anglo-Saxon model" encouraged growth of the money stock, but France saw the Depression as a necessary evil that "purged" the excess liquidity in the world economy and pushed indebted companies into failure.

Successive governments maintained restrictive policies until 1934, and interest rates were kept high to maintain the attractiveness of the franc. The absence of contracyclical policies kept the state budget in balance.

In 1934 and 1935, the Pierre-Étienne Flandin government had a less restrictive policy allowing short-term indebtedness. The Banque de France lost 15 percent of its reserves, and the government was replaced by one led by Pierre Laval, who installed a provisionally deflationist policy before he accepted a public deficit. The French franc ran into a new crisis.

Laval tried in 1935 to reduce salaries in an effort to lessen unemployment, but ran into the resistance of unions in the public sector.

The inability of French production to take off was in contrast to the experience of the United Kingdom, which had devalued in 1931. Devaluation was so unpopular in France that it occurred only in 1936.

== Description ==
Breton journalist Morvan Lebesque described the period thus:

The winter I spent on the streets - the winter of '32-33 - was no milder nor harder than any other winter; the winter cold is like labour pains - whether it lasts for a longer or shorter period of time there is always the same amount of pain. That particular winter, it snowed and it froze; thousands of young men, forced out of their jobs by the crisis, struggled on to their last penny, to the end of their tether then, in despair, abandoned the fight... On street benches and at métro entrances, groups of exhausted and starving young men would be trying not to die. I don't know how many never came round. I can only say what I saw. In the rue Madame one day I saw a child drop a sweet which someone trod on, then the man behind bent down and picked it up, wiped it and ate it.

== From depression to war ==
The distress of the population had political consequences. A riot on 6 February 1934 led to the fall of the government and a nation that had traditionally leaned to the right elected the socialist Popular Front government in 1936.

The Popular Front, an alliance of Socialists and Radicals with support outside the government of the Communists, was led by Léon Blum. The Popular Front introduced many measures such as the 40-hour working week and holidays with pay, but Blum felt handicapped from being able to introduce more than limited changes to the economy because of his dependence on the more right-wing Radicals. That did little to placate a population anxious for change, and a wave of strikes, involving two million workers, caused factories to be occupied. Communist Party membership rose to 300,000 in 1937.

On the night of 7–8 June 1936, employers and unions signed the Matignon Agreements by which they raised wages by 7 to 15 percent to increase workers' buying power, stimulate the economy and bring an end to the strikes. Blum brought in measures to control cereal prices, to insist for the Banque de France to place the national interest above that of the shareholders and nationalise the armaments industry. The left wanted further change, and the right was still displeased and believed that state involvement in a capitalist economy would bring disaster.

The Radicals would not accept currency controls, and the unrest resulting in capital fleeing abroad, which weakened the economy. Employers trying to minimise the effects of the Matignon Agreements created more social tension and, in turn, a further flight of capital.

Devaluation of the franc by 30% became inevitable, despite earlier government assurances that it would not happen. In January 1937, Blum went further and announced "a pause" to social reforms. The Senate refused to give him emergency powers to cope with the recession, and he resigned on 20 June 1937. The first Popular Front began to fall apart, and a second had even less success.

French President Lebrun called on the Radical leader, Édouard Daladier, to form a new government without the Socialists. Daladier tried to rely on liberal economics to rescue or keep afloat the economy in a worldwide sea of financial difficulties. Employers and police acted harshly against strikers and were determined to root out "troublemakers". In 1938, the Senate gave Daladier the emergency powers that Blum had been denied, and the government favoured employers over workers in industrial disputes, particularly in companies that had come close to coming under the control of their workers.

Under Daladier, economic conditions slightly improved, despite a backdrop of growing, increasingly vocal communist and fascist movements. The gains, however, were greatly caused by the growth of the armaments industry. On 3 September 1939, France declared war on Germany, which had invaded Poland.

== See also ==
- Thiès massacre of striking workers in French West Africa, who went on strike due to hardships caused by the Great Depression
- Groupe X-Crise
- Hugo (film)
