= Socialist Party of France – Jean Jaurès Union =

Political party in France (1932-35)

Socialist Party of France - Jean Jaurès Union Parti socialiste de France-Union Jean Jaurès
- Abbreviation: PSdF; PSdF-JJ; PSdF-UJJ
- Leader: Marcel Déat
- Founder: Marcel Déat; Paul Ramadier; Adrien Marquet
- Founded: December 1933; 92 years ago
- Dissolved: November 3, 1935; 90 years ago
- Split from: SFIO
- Merged into: Socialist Republican Union
- Ideology: Neosocialism
- Political position: Center-left
- Colours: Black

The Socialist Party of France – Jean Jaurès Union (French: Parti socialiste de France-Union Jean Jaurès, PSdF) was a political party in France founded in 1933 during the late Third Republic which united the right wing of the French Section of the Workers' International (SFIO). The PSdF was formed by neosocialist members of the SFIO expelled from the party in 1933. These included Marcel Déat, Paul Ramadier and Adrien Marquet. The party was weak and merged with the Republican-Socialist Party and the French Socialist Party to form the Socialist Republican Union (USR) in 1935. The USR participated in the Popular Front.
