= Socialist Republican Union =

Socialist Republican Union Union socialiste républicaine
- Abbreviation: USR
- Leader: Marcel Déat
- President: Joseph Paul-Boncour
- Founded: December 5, 1935; 90 years ago
- Dissolved: July 10, 1940; 86 years ago
- Merger of: Socialist Party of France - Jean Jaurès Union; French Socialist Party; Republican-Socialist Party
- Ideology: Democratic socialism Neosocialism; Reformism; Social democracy Antifascism; Pacifism
- Political position: Centre-left
- National affiliation: Popular Front (1936–1938)
- International affiliation: Labour and Socialist International
- Colours: Black

The Socialist Republican Union (French: Union socialiste républicaine, USR) was a political party in France founded in 1935 during the late Third Republic which united the right wing of the French Section of the Workers' International with the left wing of the Radical republican movement.

== Prehistory: Socialist Republicanism ==
The USR was founded on 3 November 1935 as a fusion of three small parties situated between the Marxist-socialist SFIO and the Radical PRRRS. It represented the consolidation into one single party of a particular political current that had been present in France since the 1890s: Socialist Republicanism.

In late nineteenth-century France, formal political parties structured were virtually non-existent, except as informal parliamentary caucuses. Instead, each locality had its own socialist and/or republican club or committee, loosely grouped into federations. From 1900 these loose associations began to build a more formal structure, starting with the progressive centre-left Radical-Socialist Party (PRRRS, founded 1901) and the unified socialist party (SFIO), founded 1905). This forced left-wing republicans to decide whether to enter one or the other party. Many declined, rejecting the parliamentary-party discipline required: those right-wing Radicals who refused now labelled themselves the 'Independent Radicals' and sat in parliament in the very loose Radical Left group; from 1907, those right-wing socialists and left-wing Radicals who rejected strict party discipline called themselves 'Independent Socialists' and sat in parliament under the banner of 'Socialist Republicans', between the SFIO and PRRRS.

The Socialist Republicans were highly diverse in their particular opinions, precisely as they did not possess a structured mass party but instead were a collection of independents and small local parties. However, they shared a belief in social reformism that connected them to the right wing of the SFIO, and a belief in the absolute legitimacy of parliamentary sovereignty, which connected them to the Radical-Socialists. As such, they often acted as a bridge between these two larger left-wing parties.

Several of France's leading socialist and republican figures of the early 20th century originally belonged to this current: Jean Jaurès (who went on to become the chief figure of the French socialist Party); René Viviani and Aristide Briand (both heads of government around the time of the first world war); Alexandre Millerand (head of state after the war). Some socialist-republicans, such as Jaurès, ended up drifting to Marxism; others, like Millerand, to a Jacobin-inspired right-wing nationalism: it was never a coherent body of thought, but a catch-all grouping for all those who did not exactly fit into the orthodox Socialist Party or the Radical-Socialist Party.

Between 1907 and 1935, socialist-republicans formed several loose parliamentary parties. They were periodically joined by splinters from the orthodox Socialist Party's right-wing.

- 1907 to 1911: the Independent Socialist Party, which in 1911 became the PSR;
- 1911 to 1935: the main Socialist Republican Party (PSR);
- 1919 to 1926: the Socialist Party of France, a splinter of the SFIO's reformist right-wing, which eventually merged into the PSR;
- 1928 to 1935: a new party named the Socialist Party of France, which splintered from the PSR;
- 1933 to 1935: the 'Jean Jaurès' French Socialist Party, another splinter of the SFIO's reformist right-wing.

== Component Parties of the Socialist Republican Union ==
- The Republican-Socialist Party (PRS). This was a parliamentary group formed in 1911 (and revived in 1923 after a brief disappearance) by non-Marxist socialists who declined to join the SFIO and who wished to remain close to the Radicals. It provided a political home to independents elected to parliament who for doctrinal, organisational or personal reasons could not or would not sit among the SFIO or the PRRRS. Consequently it was quite a diffuse organisation borrowing elements from both adjacent parties: some of its members were social-democrats close to the reformist right wing of the SFIO, and others were republicans who overlapped with the left wing of the Radical-Socialists (and in some cases originally came from this party, as was the case for the Socialist Republican Party's own leader Maurice Viollette) . The party had provided several the major figures of the French republican left, including former premiers Aristide Briand and Réné Viviani.
- The French Socialist Party. This had originated as a splinter of the SFIO's reformist right-wing in 1919, which briefly merged with the Socialist Republican Party (1926–28) before disagreements over coalition partners prompted it to be revived as a semi-independent parliamentary grouping attached to the PSR). Its main figures were Maxence Bibié and Anatole de Monzie. The boundary between this party and the PRS was fluid, and many independents were simply elected as 'Socialist Republicans' and decided for themselves which of the two groups to sit with in parliament.
- The Socialist Party of France (PSdF), labelled the 'Jean Jaurès' Socialist Party by its members and the Neo-Socialists by others. This was founded in December 1933 by the veteran socialist leader Pierre Renaudel. The SFIO had a strict policy of non-participation as a minority coalition partner in any government dominated by the bourgeois republican left; Renaudel's faction of thirty reformist socialists sought to enter government, and had been expelled from the SFIO for recurrently supporting centre-left republican cabinets, setting up a dissident social-democratic party to the right of the SFIO and left of the Socialist Republicans.

== History ==
These splinters meant that by 1935 the French Chamber of Deputies contained a diffuse array of about sixty parliamentarians situated between the SFIO and the PRRS, broadly sharing a tradition of non-Marxist reformist socialism and Radical republicanism. After Renaudel's death in the spring of 1935 the PSDF leader Marcel Déat opened negotiations with the two Socialist Republican parties to coordinate the three groups' activities in parliament. This led first to their establishing an 'inter-group' (combined parliamentary party) in the summer of 1935, and subsequently to the creation of a formal political party in November 1935. The USR was joined by other left-wing independents who were not members of the three original groups, including the dissident socialist Ludovic Frossard and the dissident republican Eugène Frot.

In the elections of 1936 the USR aspired to act as a midpoint between traditional Radicalism and orthodox Marxian socialism, expecting that the political crisis since 1933 had weakened voters' satisfaction with the traditional left parties: the Socialists for their rigid refusal to enter a reformist government that could mitigate the effects of the Great Depression; the Radical-Socialists for their ostensible lack of principle for having switched from an alliance with the Socialists to one with the conservatives midway through the legislature. The USR hoped that by offering French voters a synthesis of both main parties, a centre-left republican party committed to a systematic programme of economic state intervention, it could offer a major political alternative. However the formation of the Popular Front made this offer redundant. The SFIO now accepted participation in a coalition government dedicated to socio-economic reforms, while the PRRRS had now publicly positioned itself as a party of anti-fascism and thereby pledged to remain faithful to the electoral alliance of the left.

The USR thus failed to achieve the electoral breakthrough it had anticipated. Before the election its merged parliamentary party had contained 47 deputies; after, it had been reduced to a mere 27, fewer than the PSR and PSF had achieved on their own in 1932. The Neo-Socialist wing of the party was the hardest hit - their most prominent figure, Marcel Déat, lost his seat - and the successful USR deputies were drawn largely from the Socialist Republican wings.

The USR participated in the subsequent Popular Front governments of Léon Blum and Camille Chautemps (1936 to 1938), as well as in the centrist republican governments of Édouard Daladier and Paul Reynaud (1938 to 1940). Six of its members held cabinet rank during this period: Paul-Boncour, Frossard, de Monzie, Ramadier, Ramette, Patenotre and Pomaret.

The USR was effectively killed by World War II, and its last congress was held in May 1939. Its members took divergent paths during the war: some, like Paul-Boncour, refused to vote plenary powers to Marshal Pétain, while others actively collaborated with the Vichy Regime and Nazi occupiers, notably Déat whose National Rally aspired to act as the single party for the collaborationist regime. As a result of these divisions the party was not resurrected after the Liberation: most of its members opted to enter either the SFIO or the new umbrella party of liberal progressives, the Rally of the Republican Left.

== Bibliography ==
- Bergounioux, Alain (1978). "Le néo-socialisme. Marcel Déat: réformisme traditionnel ou esprit des années trente". Revue Historique (in French). 260 (2): 389–412. ISSN 0035-3264.
- Billard, Yves (1993). Le Parti républicain socialiste (1911-1934) (Doctoral thesis) (in French). Paris.
- Billard, Yves (1996). "Un parti républicain-socialiste a vraiment existé". Vingtième Siècle, revue d'histoire (in French). 51: 43–55. doi:10.3406/xxs.1996.4456.
- Jackson, Julian (1985). The Politics of Depression in France 1932-1936. Cambridge University Press. ISBN 0-521-26559-2.
- Rémy, Sylvie (2001). Les Socialistes indépendants de la fin du XIXe siècle au début du XXe siècle en France (Doctoral thesis) (in French). Limoges.
- Ruhlmann, Jean (1989). "Les classes moyennes, le Parti Socialiste de France et le Plan : l'impossible ralliement". Matériaux pour l'histoire de notre temps (in French). 17: 47–52. doi:10.3406/mat.1989.401599.
