= Republican-Socialist Party =

Political party in France (1911-34)

Republican-Socialist Party Parti républicain-socialiste
- General Secretary: René Viviani (last)
- Honorary President: Paul Painlevé
- Founded: 10 July 1911; 115 years ago
- Dissolved: 1934; 92 years ago
- Preceded by: Independent Socialists
- Merged into: Socialist Republican Union
- Headquarters: Paris, France
- Membership (1926): 9,000
- Ideology: Democratic socialism Social democracy Progressivism; Reformist socialism Anti-clericalism
- Political position: Centre-left
- National affiliation: Lefts Cartel (1918–1934)
- Colours: Pink (customary)

The Republican-Socialist Party (French: Parti républicain-socialiste, PRS) was a French socialist political party during the Third Republic founded in 1911 and dissolved in 1934.

== History ==
Founded by non-Marxist socialists who refused to join the French Section of the Workers' International (SFIO) after its foundation in 1905, and by independent Radicals who refused to join the Radical-Socialist Party when its parliamentary group required formal party membership in 1911, the PRS was a reformist socialist party located between the SFIO and the Radical-Socialist Party. PRS member René Viviani was the first French Minister of Labour (Ministre du Travail et de la Prévoyance sociale) from October 1906 until July 1909).

The PRS was weakened by an ideological contradiction between socialism and reformism in an era where the political divide was very sharp. It also suffered from an organizational division between those favouring a united and structured party like the SFIO or an independent party with independent personalities. The party was merged into the Socialist Republican Union (USR) in 1934, as were two other parties issued from the right wing of the SFIO, the French Socialist Party (PSF) and the Socialist Party of France – Jean Jaurès Union (PSdF).

In 1945, an attempt failed to recreate it within the Rally of Left Republicans. Several PRS members headed French cabinets, including Viviani, Aristide Briand, Paul Painlevé, Alexandre Millerand and Joseph Paul-Boncour.

== Bibliography ==
- Jean-Thomas Nordmann (1974). Histoire des radicaux. Paris: La Table Ronde.
- Serge Berstein (1982). Histoire du Parti radical. 2 vol. Paris: Presses de la FNSP. ISBN 2-7246-0437-7
- Gérard Baal (1994). Histoire du radicalisme. Paris: La Découverte. ISBN 2-7071-2295-5
