= Adrien Marquet =

French politician (1884–1955)

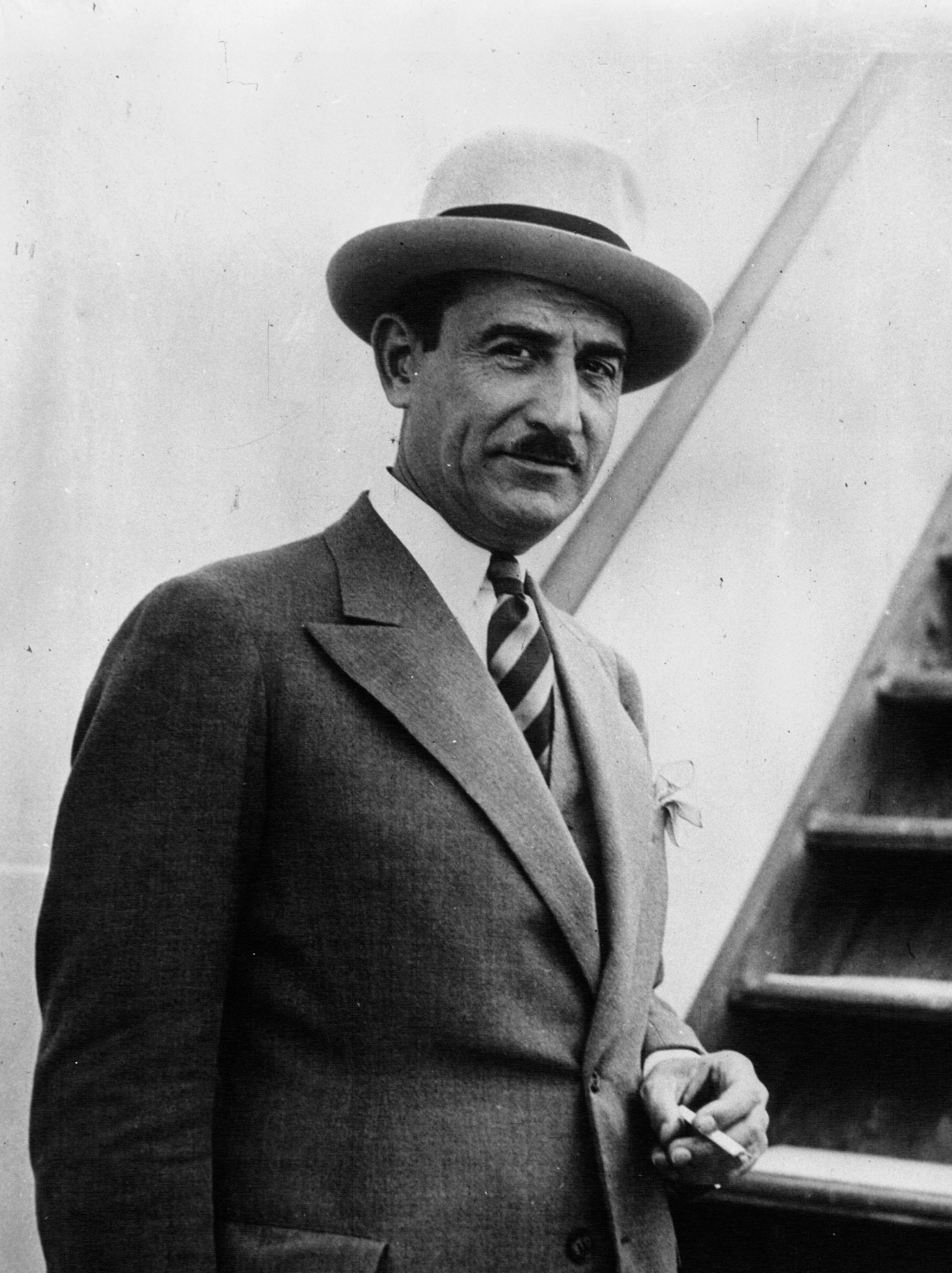

Mayor of Bordeaux
- In office 1925–1944
- Preceded by: Fernand Philippart
- Succeeded by: Jean-Fernand Audeguil

Personal details
- Born: 6 October 1884 Bordeaux, France
- Died: 3 February 1955 (aged 70) Bordeaux, France
- Party: SFIO
- Profession: Dentist

Adrien Marquet (French pronunciation: [adʁijɛ̃ maʁkɛ]; 6 October 1884 – 3 February 1955) was a socialist mayor of Bordeaux who turned to the far right.

== Career ==
Marquet was born in Bordeaux and became its socialist mayor in 1925. In 1933, he was expelled from the French Section of the Workers' International (SFIO). The expulsion involved an address to the SFIO in which he emphasized order and authority as necessary to win the masses; his position frightened Léon Blum. He and Marcel Déat then formed the Neosocialists. Later, he declared the faction to be decidedly anti-Marxist. He eventually abandoned any form of socialism and briefly served as Minister of the Interior for Philippe Pétain. Later, like Déat, he became a supporter of Pierre Laval.

== See also ==
- List of mayors of Bordeaux
