= René Besnard =

French politician

René Henry Besnard
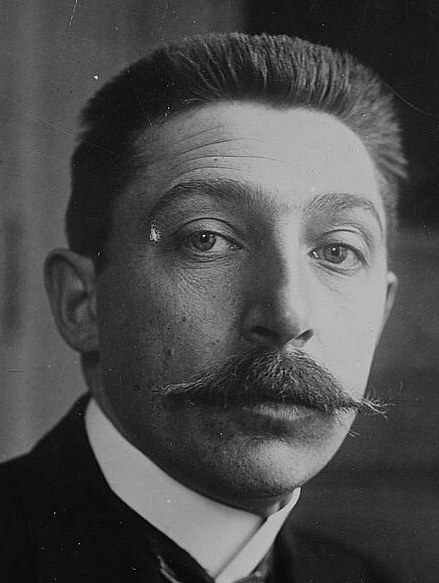

Minister of the Colonies
- In office 12 January 1913 – 18 January 1913
- Prime Minister: Aristide Briand
- Preceded by: Albert François Lebrun
- Succeeded by: Jean Morel

Minister of Labor and Social Welfare
- In office 21 January 1913 – 18 March 1913
- Prime Minister: Aristide Briand
- Preceded by: Léon Bourgeois
- Succeeded by: Henry Chéron

Minister of the Colonies
- In office 12 September 1917 – 16 November 1917
- Prime Minister: Paul Painlevé
- Preceded by: André Maginot
- Succeeded by: Henry Simon

Ambassador to Italy
- In office 1924–1928
- Preceded by: Camille Barrère
- Succeeded by: Maurice Delarue Caron de Beaumarchais

Minister of War
- In office 21 February 1930 – 25 February 1930
- Prime Minister: Camille Chautemps
- Preceded by: André Maginot
- Succeeded by: André Maginot

Personal details
- Born: 12 April 1879 Artannes-sur-Indre, Indre-et-Loire, France
- Died: 12 March 1952 (aged 72) Paris, France

René Henry Besnard (12 April 1879 – 12 March 1952) was a French politician who was a deputy for Indre-et-Loire from 1906 to 1919 and senator from 1920 to 1941. He was briefly Minister of the Colonies and then Minister of Labor and Social Welfare in 1913. He was twice Undersecretary of State for War during World War I (1914–18), and did much to reform aircraft production. He was briefly Minister of Colonies in 1917. From 1924 to 1928 Besnard was Ambassador of France to Rome. For a few days in 1930 he was Minister of War.

== Pre-war period (1879–1914) ==
René Henry Besnard was born in Artannes-sur-Indre, Indre-et-Loire, on 12 April 1879. His family was from Touraine. He qualified as a doctor of Law in 1903 with the thesis on search and seizure in criminal cases, and became a lawyer. He was elected deputy for the 1st district of Tours in the national elections of 6/20 May 1906 representing a group of Republicans, Radicals and anti-clerical Radical Socialists. In 1909 he was appointed secretary of the chamber of deputies. He was active in the chamber, and introduced several bills.

Besnard was reelected in the second round in the elections of April–May 1910. He became a member of the committees on Labor, Budget and Universal Suffrage. On 27 June 1911 he was appointed Undersecretary of State for Finance under Louis-Lucien Klotz, the Minister of Finance in the cabinet of Joseph Caillaux. He retained this position in the subsequent cabinet of Raymond Poincaré formed on 14 January 1912. He was appointed Colonial Secretary on 12 January 1913. On 21 January 1913 he was appointed Minister of Labor and Social Welfare by Briand, holding office until 18 March 1913 when the government of Louis Barthou took office. Besnard was re-elected in the general elections of April–May 1914. He became a member of the committees on Appropriations, Commerce and Industry, Army and Merchant Marine.

== World War I (1914–18) ==
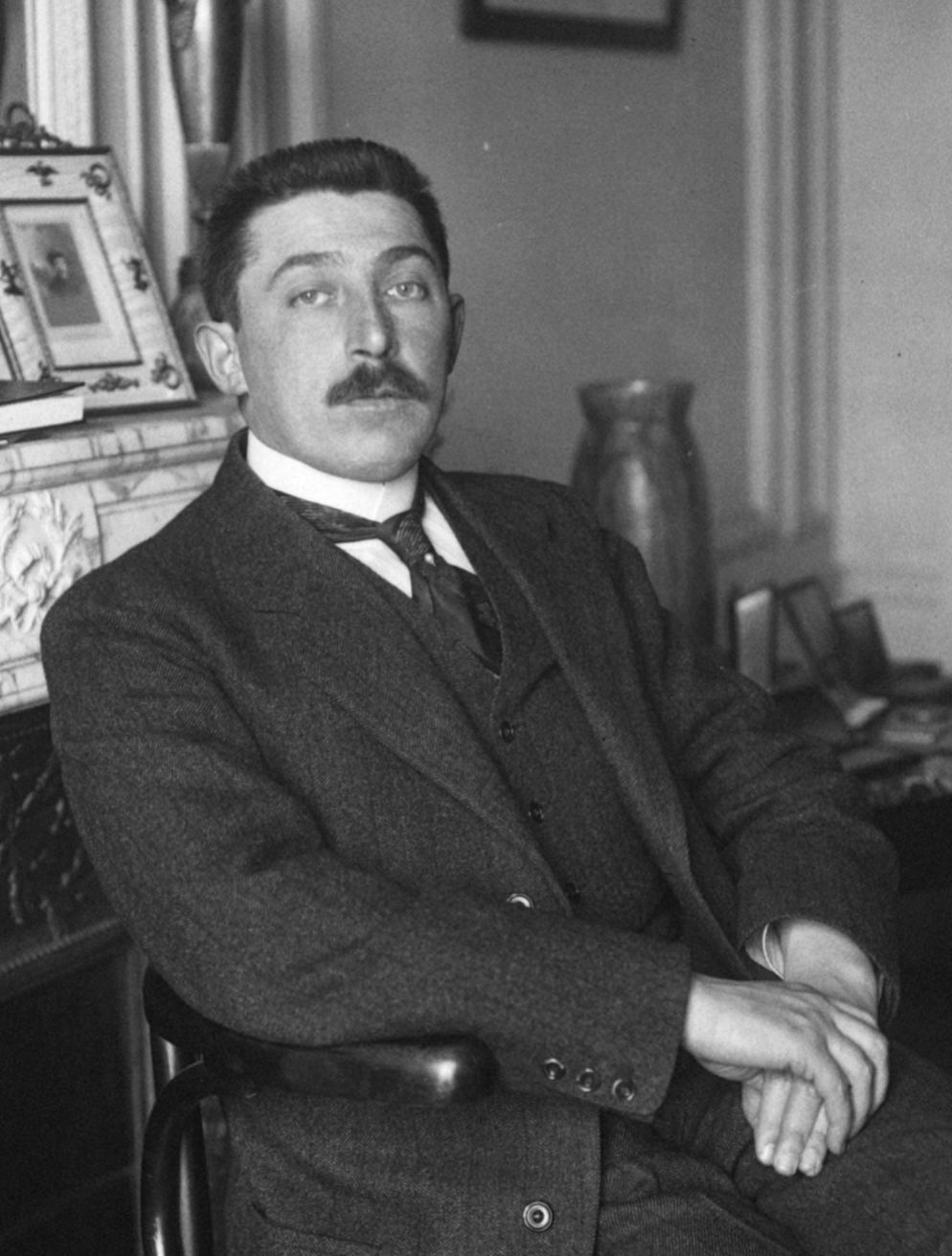
Besnard in 1914

At the outbreak of World War I (1914–18) Besnard joined the army as a second lieutenant. He returned to the government as Undersecretary of State for War in the cabinet of René Viviani on 14 September 1915. He was given responsibility for aviation, replacing the director of aviation, Auguste Hirschauer. A member of the aviation directorate said, "Young, dedicated and affable, he had all the qualities required to succeed in his difficult task, particularly that of reconciling those two warring brothers, the front and the rear." Besnard returned skilled craftsmen from the army to their previous jobs, brought the flying schools under control of the army and created the Service Technique de l'Aéronautique (STAé) to undertake research and development. He established a statistical office to accurately track airplanes and ground vehicles for the first time, and reorganized the technical, construction and repair services.

Besnard supported the plans of lieutenant-colonel Édouard Barès for large-scale production of airplanes using Hispano-Suiza 8 engines. He also decided to hasten development of the promising Caudron R.4. Besnard was in favor of using the multi-purpose Caudron R.4 in place of specialized bombers and pursuit airplanes. He proposed to merge specialized bombing and pursuit squadrons with all-purpose combat squadrons, but this did not happen. He retained his position as secretary of state for aviation in the broad-based cabinet of Aristide Briand formed on 29 October 1915. Besnard supported some level of political independence for the air force.

Besnard did not have authority over the aircraft industry, in which the manufacturers such as Édouard Michelin and Gabriel Voisin were mainly interested in profiting from their existing designs rather than innovating. He made many enemies with his reforms. He found grave defects in some Canton-Uni motors made by the Salmson company, who were supported by senator Charles Humbert, a newspaper proprietor. A violent press campaign was launched against him in which Georges Clemenceau participated. Besnard was dismissed from office and his post abolished in the aftermath of a Zeppelin raid on Paris on 29 January 1916. His resignation was accepted on 8 February 1916.

Besnard returned to the army as a captain. However, a secret committee of the Chamber of Deputies recognized the value of Besnard's efforts in December 1916. He was again appointed Undersecretary of State for War on 28 December 1916 in the cabinet of Aristide Briand under Hubert Lyautey, Minister of War and retained this position in the cabinet of Alexandre Ribot under Paul Painlevé until 7 September 1917.

When Paul Painlevé formed his government in September 1917 Besnard was appointed Minister of Colonies. He held office from 12 September to 16 November 1917, and soon came to support an active program of colonial expansion. Besnard decided to suspend recruiting in Africa until the end of the war, since the experience of the African troops might undermine their confidence in France. The government had decided to prepare a plan for settling post-war colonial issues, and the ministry was concerned that poorly-informed negotiators could use the colonies as bargaining counters in exchange for the return of Alsace-Lorraine. After eleven days in office, on 5 October 1917 Besnard established a commission de documentation "to collect and coordinate all the documents relating to post-war political problems in the colonial sphere." The commission was dominated by Albert Duchêne of the African department, and the resulting report made it clear that the main priority was to enlarge the French empire in Africa. Besnard left the Ministry of Colonies when the Painlevé cabinet fell on 13 November 1917.

== Later career (1918–52) ==
In 1919 Besnard was a member of the Chamber of Deputies committee to review the peace treaties. He was the rapporteur of the bill to approve the section of the Treaty of Versailles dealing with German colonies on 28 June 1919. That year he published a book on economics titled Où va-t-on? (Where are we going?). He did not run for reelection in the general elections on 16 November 1919. Besnard was elected to the Senate on 11 January 1920 for Indre-et-Loire, and was reelected on 6 January 1924, and 10 January 1933. He belonged to the Democratic Left group in the Senate. Besnard became rapporteur of the budgets for Public Education and for War, and a member of the Army Committee.

From 1924 to 1928 Besnard was Ambassador of France to Rome. There he was involved in the early stages of what would become a major scandal concerning the financier Albert Oustric. In 1926 Oustric became involved in Snia Viscosa, an Italian maker of artificial silk controlled by the financier Riccardo Gualino. Oustric wanted to list shares of Snia Viscosa in France. The responsible official in the Ministry of Finance asked the opinion of Besnard in Rome. Besnard wrote that he had no objection. The official then submitted the issue to Raoul Péret, Minister of Finance. Péret replied that Besnard had insisted that the authorization be granted, and the shares were listed.

Prime Minister Camille Chautemps named Besnard Minister of War on 21 February 1930, but the cabinet was forced out of office on 25 February 1930. After the spectacular and fraudulent bankruptcy of Albert Oustric in 1930 a commission of inquiry found that Péret had acted improperly. Besnard had been seriously involved in the Oustric affair, which caused the fall of the government of André Tardieu in December 1930. Besnard was investigated for his role in the affair by the High Court. He was acquitted on technical grounds, but his reputation was tainted. Nevertheless, he was reelected to the Senate in January 1933, and was admitted to the Ligue des droits de l'homme (Human Rights League), which was normally strongly opposed to corruption.

After the start of World War II (1939–45) Besnard visited Italy, which had not yet declared war against France, and had a long interview with the Foreign Minister, Galeazzo Ciano around 1 January 1940. Ciano warned him that the Germans were preparing a massive attack against Belgium and the Netherlands. Besnard visited Rome as high-commissioner of the planned 1942 Exposition, but did not meet the Italian dictator Benito Mussolini. On 10 July 1940 Besnard voted to delegate power to Marshal Philippe Pétain. He left politics after this. He died in Paris on 12 March 1952 at the age of 73 years. He was an officer of the Legion of Honor.

== Publications ==
- Besnard, René (1901). Des garanties légales de l'exécution du legs particulier. Université de Paris. p. 118.
- Besnard, René (1904). Des perquisitions et des saisies en matière criminelle. V. Giard & E. Brière. p. 161.
- Besnard, René; Aymard, Camille (1914). L'Oeuvre française au Maroc. Hachette. p. 253.
- Besnard, René (1917). Note pour le fonctionnement de sections d'études constituées auprès du service d'Alsace-Lorraine. Ministère de la guerre, Service d'Alsace-Lorraine. p. 34.
- Pradier, P. Perreau; Besnard, René (1918). Nos resources coloniales. p. 145.
- Besnard, René (1919). Rapport fait au nom de la Commission chargée d'examiner le projet de loi portant approbation du traité de paix conclu à Versailles le 28 juin 1919: Droit et intérêts allemands hors de l'Allemagne. Colonies allemandes)... imp. Martinet. p. 32.
- Besnard, Réne Henry; Aymard, Camille Edmond (1920). Où va-t-on?: La France de demain. Hachette. p. 255.

== Sources ==
- Amson, Daniel (2000). "La Responsabilité politique et pénale des ministres de 1789 à 1958" (PDF). Pourvoirs (in French) (92). Archived from the original (PDF) on 2015-09-24.
- Andrew, Christopher M.; Kanya-Forstner, Alexander Sydney (1981). The Climax of French Imperial Expansion, 1914-1924. Stanford University Press. ISBN 978-0-8047-1101-2.
- Bernard, Philippe; Dubief, Henri; Forster, Anthony (1988-02-26). The Decline of the Third Republic, 1914-1938. Cambridge University Press. ISBN 978-0-521-35854-5.
- Berstein, Serge; Ruby, Marcel (2004). Un siècle de radicalisme. Presses Univ. Septentrion. ISBN 978-2-85939-814-9.
- Bonin, Hubert (April–June 1996). "Oustric, un financier prédateur ? (1914-1930)". Revue Historique (in French). 295 (2 (598)). Presses Universitaires de France: 429–448. JSTOR 40955974.
- Castex, Jean; Laspalles, Louis; Barès, José (1994). Le général Barès: "créateur et inspirateur de l'aviation". Nouvelles Editions Latines. ISBN 978-2-7233-0485-6.
- Eichengreen, Barry (2014-12-20). Hall of Mirrors: The Great Depression, the Great Recession, and the Uses-and Misuses-of History. Oxford University Press. ISBN 978-0-19-939200-1.
- Harvey, A. D. (1992). Collision of Empires: Britain in Three World Wars, 1793-1945. A&C Black. ISBN 978-1-85285-078-4.
- Irvine, William (2006-12-08). Between Justice And Politics: The Ligue Des Droits De L'Homme, 1898-1945. Stanford University Press. ISBN 978-0-8047-6787-3.
- Jolly, Jean (1977). "BESNARD René". Dictionnaire des Parlementaires français.
- King, Jere Clemens (1951). Generals and Politicians. University of California Press. p. 256. GGKEY:1YN4ZN9NXJN.
- Last, Dick van Galen (2015-02-26). Black Shame: African Soldiers in Europe, 1914-1922. Bloomsbury Publishing. ISBN 978-1-4725-2591-8.
- Lawson, Eric; Lawson, Jane (2007-10-01). The First Air Campaign: August 1914- November 1918. Da Capo Press. ISBN 978-0-306-81668-0.
- Pernot, Georges (1971-01-01). Journal de guerre, 1940-1941. Presses Univ. Franche-Comté. GGKEY:RTRQYCW0R8E.
- Sumner, Ian (2015-04-30). Kings of the Air: French Aces and Airmen of the Great War. Pen and Sword. ISBN 978-1-78346-338-1.
