= Henry Chéron =

French lawyer and politician

Henry Frédéric Chéron
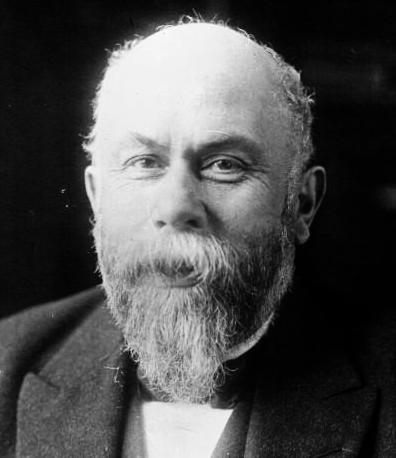
- Chéron in 1921

Minister of Labor and Social Security
- In office 22 March 1913 – 9 December 1913
- Prime Minister: Louis Barthou
- Preceded by: René Besnard
- Succeeded by: Albert Métin

Minister of Agriculture
- In office 15 January 1922 – 29 March 1924
- Prime Minister: Raymond Poincaré
- Preceded by: Edmond Lefebvre du Prey
- Succeeded by: Joseph Capus

Minister of Commerce and Industry
- In office 14 September 1928 – 11 November 1928
- Prime Minister: Raymond Poincaré
- Preceded by: Maurice Bokanowski
- Succeeded by: Georges Bonnefous

Minister of Finance
- In office 11 November 1928 – 21 February 1930
- Prime Minister: Raymond Poincaré; Aristide Briand; André Tardieu
- Preceded by: Raymond Poincaré
- Succeeded by: Charles Dumont

Minister of Justice
- In office 17 November 1930 – 22 January 1931
- Prime Minister: André Tardieu; Théodore Steeg
- Preceded by: Raoul Péret
- Succeeded by: Léon Bérard

Minister of Finance
- In office 18 December 1932 – 31 January 1933
- Prime Minister: Joseph Paul-Boncour
- Preceded by: Louis Germain-Martin
- Succeeded by: Georges Bonnet

Minister of Justice
- In office 9 February 1934 – 14 October 1934
- Prime Minister: Gaston Doumergue
- Preceded by: Eugène Penancier
- Succeeded by: Henry Lémery

Personal details
- Born: 11 May 1867 Lisieux, Calvados, France
- Died: 14 April 1936 (aged 68) Lisieux, Calvados, France
- Occupation: Lawyer, politician

Henry Frédéric Chéron (French pronunciation: [ɑ̃ʁi fʁedeʁik ʃeʁɔ̃]; 11 May 1867 – 14 April 1936) was a French lawyer and politician who became active in local politics in the Calvados department of Normandy while still a young man, and always maintained his roots in Normandy. He was elected to the Chamber of Deputies and then to the Senate, and held various ministerial posts between 1913 and 1934. He generally held moderately conservative views, believed in fiscal responsibility and balanced budgets, and felt strongly that agriculture was the foundation of France's prosperity.

== Early years ==
Henry Frédéric Chéron was born on 11 May 1867 at Lisieux, Calvados. His father, Isidore-Frédéric Chéron (born in 1843), was a sales representative. His mother was Felicie Duval (1844–1912). Henry Chéron worked as a technician in a pharmacy to earn money to attend law school. On 8 July 1889 he married Marie-Louise Fauguet, daughter of a large landowner of Calvados. They had two sons. Henry Chéron obtained a degree in law in 1891.

== Local politician ==
Chéron was mayor of Lisieux, Calvados from 1894 to 1936, and General Councillor for the canton of Lisieux from 1901 to 1936. He was a moderate conservative. He was an affable and approachable leader. He was one of the first mayors in Normandy to apply the restrictions to drinking establishments authorized by the law of 1880. He opened a municipal abattoir in order to reduce the cost of meat to the people of Lisieux. Chéron was president of the general council of Calvados from 1911 to 1936. Chéron ran for election as deputy for Calvados on four occasions in 1893, 1896, 1898 and 1902, but although his views were moderate he was not sufficiently conservative for the electorate.

== Deputy ==
Chéron ran successfully for election as deputy for the 1st district of Caen on 6 May 1906. He was reelected as deputy on 24 April 1910. Chéron was appointed Under-Secretary of State for War on 25 October 1906 in the cabinet of Georges Clemenceau. He was popular for his attempts to improve the living conditions of the troops. In the first cabinet of Aristide Briand, formed on 24 July 1909, he was appointed Under-Secretary of State for the Navy. He undertook an administrative reorganization, and tried to mediate an end to a strike of enlisted seamen.

On 2 November 1910 the cabinet was dissolved and Chéron left the government. He joined the radical left, and presented five bills on social issues. He was chosen to report on many financial projects, and to present the general report on the budget in 1911, 1912 and 1913. On 23 January 1913 he presented and defended a vote of confidence in the Briand government. Chéron was an honorary president of the French consultative committee to the first International Eugenics Conference in London in 1912.

On 22 March 1913 Louis Barthou appointed Chéron Minister of Labor and Social Security (Ministre du Travail et de la Prévoyance sociale). Chéron appointed a commission to prepare a law on regulating savings companies to protect small savers. He also tried to apply the law on workers' pensions. He left office when the Barthou cabinet fell on 9 December 1913.

== Senator ==
Chéron was elected to the Senate on 20 July 1913. He was reelected to the Senate on 9 January 1921 and on 20 October 1929. He remained a Senator until his death in 1936. He was actively interested in social issues, but was primarily involved in financial issues. During World War I (1914–18) he worked hard for the war effort. He submitted many legal texts on ways to ensure that as many men as possible were available to the army. On 23 December 1916 he led the Senate to adopt a motion letting the Briand government place the entire war effort under one organization. He also submitted proposals to reduce the social costs of the war, on topics such as rents, leases and taxation of food. One of his proposals significantly extended the role of trade unions.

After the war there was a widespread feeling that France must produce more children to make up for the wartime losses. A law against propaganda for abortion and contraception was proposed in January 1919. It included an article that required doctors to give information about abortion care providers even if they had obtained the information under professional secrecy. As a lawyer, Chéron considered that principle of confidentiality was "the safeguard of his profession." He hastened to clarify that confidentiality was "enacted not in the interests of a profession, but in that of the public order and individual security". He granted that women made all decisions about family planning, and said that propaganda for abortion and contraception "consists in saying to French women: 'You will no longer have children.'" However, Chéron said Malthusian propaganda was "against the very existence of the country ... this is a question of life or death for France."

Chéron's was preoccupied with restoring the French economy after World War I. He advocated fiscal discipline with reduced public and private spending. He supported economic liberalism, and saw agriculture as the driver of economic growth. In 1921 he was general rapporteur of the Senate's Finance Committee, where he made many suggestions on control of public expenditures, and rapporteur on the commission on state contracts.

== Minister of Agriculture ==
On 15 January 1922 Raymond Poincaré appointed Chéron Minister of Agriculture. Chéron saw agriculture as the foundation for prosperity and a balanced budget, and wanted to make France self-sufficient in food. He supported rural electrification, increased production of fertilizer, cooperative abattoirs and reduced railway tariffs for agricultural products. He was involved in programs for agricultural education, marketing, insurance and social welfare, and laws to prevent fragmentation of farm properties. He restored the freedom to export agricultural products, while restricting imports of dairy products. Chéron was blamed for rising prices, which he in turn blamed on profiteers.

Chéron left office on 26 March 1924, and again became active in the Senate Finance Committee. He continued to promote his economic doctrine of increasing agricultural production while restoring public finances. He proclaimed, "Wheat is gold." He was made president of the Union républicaine group of Senators. He defended the bill to legalize the Caisse d'amortissement (Sinking Fund) to amortize public debt, and projects to increase tax revenues and stabilize the franc. In February 1928 Chéron obtained approval in the Senate and Chamber for a bill making preparation for military service compulsory, with the goal of ensuring that when men were called up for military service they would be found fit.

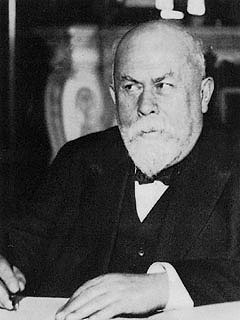
Chéron as Minister of Finance

== Minister of Finance ==
On 14 September 1928 Poincaré appointed Chéron Minister of Commerce and Industry to replace Maurice Bokanowski, who had died, then on 11 November 1928 made him Minister of Finance. Chéron was Minister of Finance in Pointcaré's cabinet from 11 November 1928 to 29 July 1929, in the subsequent cabinet of Briand from 29 July to 3 November 1929 and then in the cabinet of André Tardieu from 3 November 1929 to 21 February 1930. In 1929 Chéron called for an investigation of the Compagnie Foncière. In an effort to boost the economy, particularly agriculture, he continued the policy of fiscal consolidation through maintaining a balanced budget without increasing taxes. He was known for his saying L'épi sauvera le franc (agriculture will save the currency). He tried to provide support where possible for shopkeepers and small farmers. He accepted the need for new appropriations for water works and electrification.

While Chéron was in office the market was troubled by the scandal of Marthe Hanau's Gazette du Franc. He tried to increase confidence in the financial markets and give investors greater protection. He submitted the law of 30 December 1828 that established an insurance fund and protection against agricultural disasters. He wrote the decree of 17 February 1930 on the administrative and financial organization of municipal utilities, and participation of communes in private companies. He defended the agreements in London and Washington on repayment of French debt, and the French positions at the Hague Conference on the Bank for International Settlements. Chéron was criticized for retaining his portfolio under Tardieu and giving support to a policy of relief that he had previously condemned. He asserted that he would maintain financial stability, but on 17 February 1930 lost a vote of confidence and left the cabinet. He was replaced by Charles Dumont.

== Last years ==
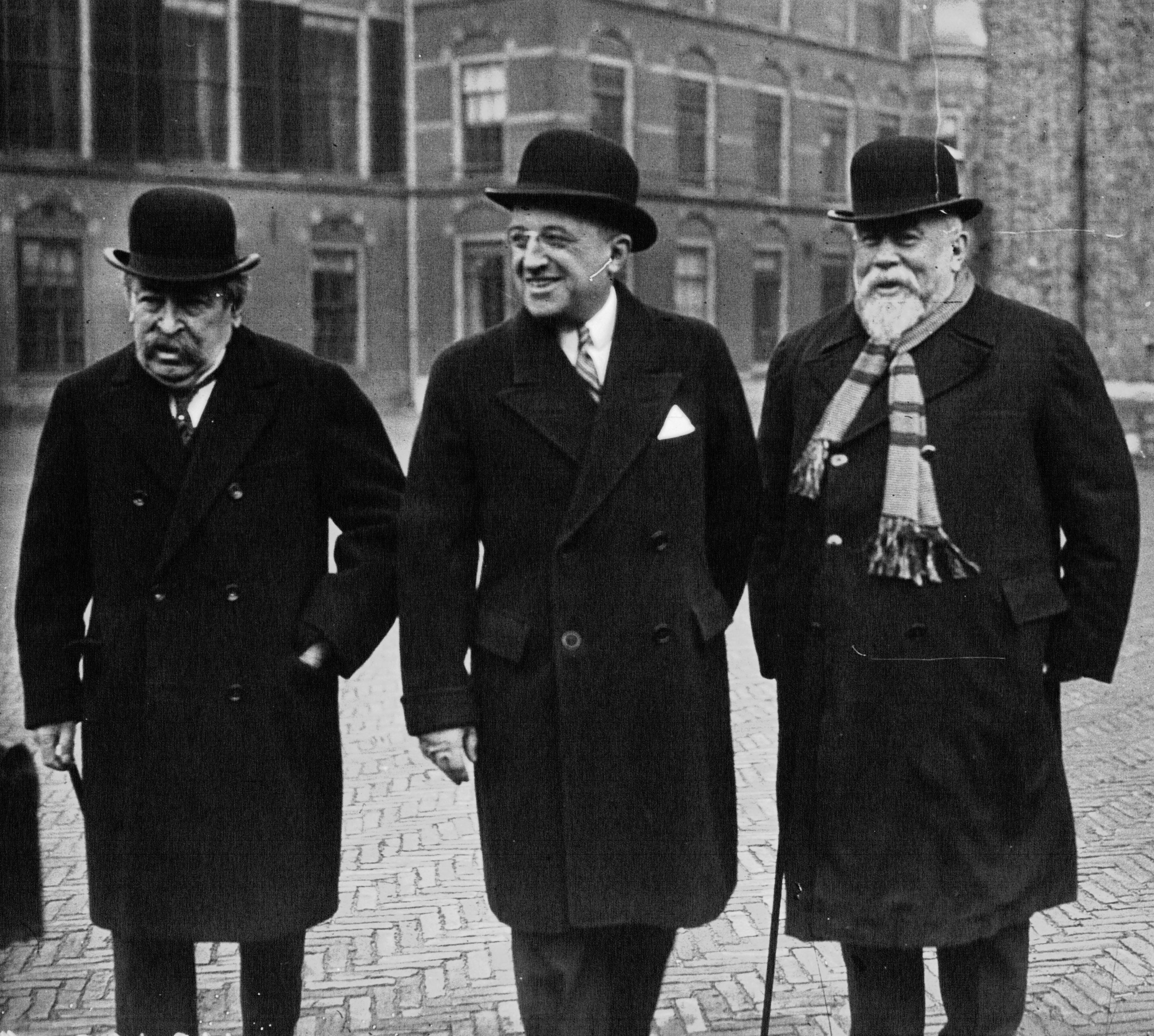
Briand, Tardieu and Chéron at the Hague Conference in 1930

On 17 November 1930 Tardieu appointed Chéron Minister of Justice to replace Raoul Péret, who was involved in the affair of the criminal bankruptcy of the banker Albert Oustric. Chéron obtained approval of a parliamentary commission of inquiry. He affirmed his commitment to clean up certain financial circles and deal with the guilty to the full extent of the law. On 24 December 1930 he sent a circular to all general prosecutors in France, urging them to take the lead in prosecutions, regardless of who was involved, and not to ask for prior approval from the Ministry. Théodore Steeg retained him as Minister of Justice until 22 January 1931, when Steeg's cabinet fell.

Chéron was briefly Minister of Finance in the cabinet of Joseph Paul-Boncour from 18 December 1932 to 21 January 1933. His political allies were disgusted by his decision to join the Radical Boncour government. Chéron set up a committee under Charles Farnier, assistant governor of the Banque de France, to dispel alarmist rumors about the 1933 budget deficit. In a report that was leaked to Le Temps on 19 January 1933 Charnier reported that the causes were an increase in state expenditure of almost 10 billion frances and a drop in tax revenue of almost 6 billion francs. The government could not count on an economic recovery solving the problem, but would have to implement an austerity program. Chéron proposed to restore a balanced budget in part through new taxes and in part through cost reductions, including civil service salaries. He lost his position when he found himself in the minority on 28 January 1933 after an all-night session. He was replaced by Georges Bonnet.

Chéron accepted the position of Minister of Justice in the cabinet formed by Gaston Doumergue after 6 February 1934. In March 1934 Chéron submitted a bill that barred naturalized citizens from certain occupations for a period after they had obtained citizenship. These would include positions in the civil service, semi-public professions such as notaries, and lawyers. Nothing was done about the proposal until June 1934, when Deputy Aulois proposed a similar but more restrictive law in the Chamber. This was approved by the Chamber and then by the Senate without debate, and became law on 19 July 1934. Naturalized citizens now had to wait for ten years before they could practice law in France. The communist journal L'Humanité of 29 September 1934 cited a circular issued by Chéron to public prosecutors in frontier areas warning them to monitor communists, who were "inciting soldiers to disobey their leaders" and were sabotaging mobilization.

Chéron was appointed Justice Minister at a time when the Stavisky scandal had come into the open. He said, "We have arrived at a time when the public consciousness craves closure" and pressed for a faster investigation, although maintaining at times that he respected judicial freedom. While worrying about the effect the revelations would have on the government, he had to deal with constant questions from a 44-member parliamentary commission of inquiry which continued throughout his term of office. In August 1934 Georges Mandel accused Chéron of refraining from prosecuting friends of Stavisky. The commission of inquiry passed a motion asking what Chéron had done about 26 cases they had sent him to have investigated. Le Cri du Jour said Chéron must resign and action must be taken on these cases or Mandel would bring down Doumerge's government. Chéron's loyalty was questioned over the affair of Albert Prince. (Note: Albert Prince, the magistrate who had been leading the investigation into the Stavisky affair, was found dead on 20 February 1934 on the Paris-Dijon railway, with an open and empty briefcase nearby. He had been seen the day before struggling with two men in a motor vehicle. Prince had been scheduled to soon give an initial report of his investigations to Chéron. The case was never solved. Public outrage eventually forced Chéron to resign.) Chéron resigned on 14 October 1934.

Chéron remained in the Senate until his death, but was no longer as active. He died at Lisieux following surgery on 14 April 1936, aged 69.

The anarchist Victor Méric wrote a hostile profile in January 1910 in which he described Chéron as having a round head, thick beard, and small eyes almost glued to the side of a thick nose, giving the impression of an educated calf. A more sympathetic author, writing of Chéron in 1931, described him as a huge, jovial figure, full of energy, a gourmand with an enormous appetite. There is an Avenue Henry Chéron in Caen and a Rue Henry Chéron in Lisieux.

== Publications ==
- Chéron (1904). Rapport présenté au Conseil général dans la session d'août 1904, par M. Chéron, au nom de la Commission chargée d'examiner les modifications à apporter au règlement départemental de l'assistance médicale gratuite (in French). Caen: C. Valin. p. 8.
- Chéron (1906). Rapport... [Budget général de l'exercice 1907 (Ministère de l'intérieur; service pénitentiaire)] [13 juillet 1906] (in French). Paris: Impr. de Motteroz et Martinet. p. 74.
- Chéron (1907). Département du Calvados. Assistance des vieillards, des infirmes et des incurables privés de ressources (loi du 14 juillet 1907). I. Rapport présenté au Conseil général par la Commission spéciale chargée d'étudier le Règlement départemental (délibération du Conseil général du 20 août 1906). (Signé : Chéron.) II. Règlement départemental voté par le Conseil général le 22 août 1906 (in French). Caen: C. Valin. p. 34.
- Chéron (1918). La Loi du 9 mars 1918 sur les loyers, commentaire par Henry Chéron,... Emile Bender,... (in French). Paris: Dalloz. p. 343..
- Chéron (1922). 1er Salon de la machine agricole tenu à Paris au Grand Palais des Champs-Elysées du 28 janvier au 5 février 1922 (in French). Paris: A. Davy et fils aîné. p. 24.

== Sources ==
- "Avenue Henry Chéron Caen". Gralon (in French).
- Banet-Rivet, Raoul (2012). Souvenirs 1893 - 1958. BoD - Books on Demand France. ISBN 978-2-8106-2475-1.
- Fette, Julie (27 March 2012). Exclusions: Practicing Prejudice in French Law and Medicine, 1920-1945. Cornell University Press. p. 119. ISBN 978-0-8014-6446-1.
- "Henri CHERON". CAEF (in French).
- Jolly, Jean (1977). "CHÉRON (HENRY, FRÉDÉRIC)". Dictionnaire des parlementaires français de 1889 à 1940 (in French).
- Jankowski, Paul (2002). Stavisky: A Confidence Man in the Republic of Virtue. Cornell University Press. ISBN 0-8014-3959-0.
- Méric, Victor (23 January 1910). "Henry Chéron". Les Hommes du Jour (in French). Archived from the original on 16 April 2002.
- Mouré, Kenneth (30 April 2002). Managing the Franc Poincaré: Economic Understanding and Political Constraint in French Monetary Policy, 1928-1936. Cambridge University Press. ISBN 978-0-521-52284-7.
- Roberts, Mary Louise (15 February 2009). Civilization without Sexes: Reconstructing Gender in Postwar France, 1917-1927. University of Chicago Press. ISBN 978-0-226-72127-9.
- "Rue Henry Chéron Lisieux". Gralon (in French).
- Schneider, William H. (8 August 2002). Quality and Quantity: The Quest for Biological Regeneration in Twentieth-Century France. Cambridge University Press. ISBN 978-0-521-52461-2.
- Sherwood, John M. (1 January 1970). Georges Mandel and the Third Republic. Stanford University Press. p. 146. ISBN 978-0-8047-0731-2.
- Tumblety, Joan (4 October 2012). Remaking the Male Body: Masculinity and the uses of Physical Culture in Interwar and Vichy France. OUP Oxford. ISBN 978-0-19-163689-9.
- Vivian, Éric (21 October 2009). "La mort inexpliquée du magistrat Albert PRINCE, le 20 février 1934" (in French). Archived from the original on 3 August 2010.
