= Deschanel =

The rare French surname Deschanel is probably for D'Eschanel, regional variant form of eschamel "stepladder", nickname of a trader. It is supposed to be from the region of Lyon, maybe in the Ain département. Notable people with the surname include:

A family of French politicians:

- Émile Deschanel (1819–1904), French author and politician, and his son:
  - Paul Deschanel (1855–1922), 11th President of the French Republic

A family of French American artists:

- Caleb Deschanel (born 1944), American cinematographer, and his daughters:
  - Emily Deschanel (born 1976), actress
  - Zooey Deschanel (born 1980), singer and actress
- Mary Jo Deschanel (née Weir, born 1945), American actress
