= Maurice Bokanowski =

French lawyer and left-wing Republican politician

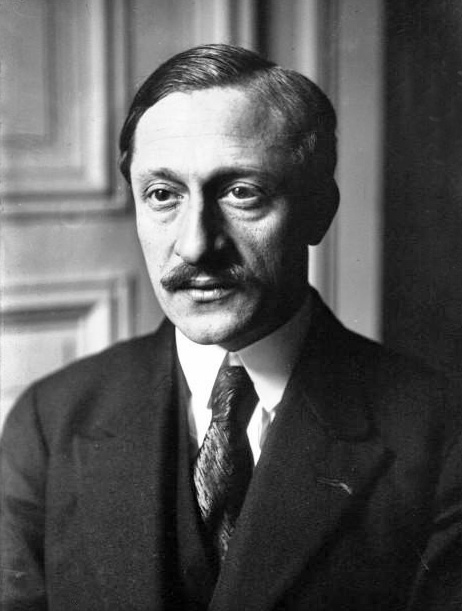
- Bokanowski as a deputy in 1919

Deputy in the French Legislature
- In office 1914–1918

Minister of the Navy
- In office 29 March 1924 – 9 June 1924
- Prime Minister: Raymond Poincaré
- Preceded by: Flaminius Raiberti
- Succeeded by: Désiré Ferry

Minister of Commerce and Industry
- In office 23 July 1926 – 2 September 1928
- Prime Minister: Édouard Herriot; Raymond Poincaré
- Preceded by: Louis Loucheur
- Succeeded by: Henry Chéron

Personal details
- Born: Moïse Bokanowski; 31 August 1879 Le Havre, Seine-Maritime, France
- Died: 2 September 1928 (aged 49) Toul, Meurthe-et-Moselle, France
- Occupation: Lawyer

Maurice Bokanowski (31 August 1879 – 2 September 1928) was a French lawyer and left-wing Republican politician who served briefly as Minister of the Navy in 1924, and was Minister of Commerce and Industry in 1926–28. He rationalized tariffs and began a reorganization of aviation in France.

== Early years ==
Maurice Bokanowski was born Moïse Bokanowski in Le Havre, Seine-Maritime on 31 August 1879. He was the sixth child of seven. His parents were Léon Bokanowski (born 1847), an ice vendor, and Julie Rasskowska (born 1848). They had married in Paris on 21 April 1868. Both his parents were Polish in origin. They wanted to move to America, and had gone to Le Havre to try to find a passage. They could not afford the cost, and soon moved to Toulon, where Moïse's father founded a novelty shop. Léon Bokanowski died in 1891 when Moïse was twelve years old. Bokanowski undertook his military service in Toulon in 1899.

Bokanowski attended the Ecole de commerce in Marseille. He then went to Paris, where he studied Law and at the same time took a course in Chinese at the National School of Modern Oriental Languages. He also studied at the free school of Political Sciences. Moïse adopted the first name "Maurice" around 1903, since a Jewish name would interfere with his planned political career. On 20 July 1903, he was initiated into the Freemason lodge L'Action of the Grand Orient de France. He remained a Freemason throughout the war, but resigned in June 1919.

Bokanowski became an advocate in the Paris court of appeal in 1904. He submitted his thesis at the Faculty of Law of the University of Paris on 19 March 1908, on the subject of Commissions internationales d'enquête. In his thesis he argued for a Societé des Nations whose laws would govern states and ensure universal peace in the same way that individuals submit to the laws of their country. Bokanowski was a member of the General Association of Parisian Students, and a committee member of the Association of former pupils of H.E.C. He married Marguerite Wolff (born 23 April 1886 in Paris) on 14 April 1908. They had three sons, Jean-François, Olivier, and Michel, and one daughter, Anne.

== Politician ==
=== Pre-war ===
Bokanowski competed in the legislative elections of 24 April and 8 May 1910 as a radical socialist in the third district of Saint-Denis. He lost, but ran successfully in the legislative elections of 26 April and 10 May 1914 for the fourth district of Saint-Denis after campaigning for three years military service. In the Chamber of Deputies he joined the Radical Socialist group. He was appointed to the committee of commerce and industry, and to the committee of insurance and social welfare. In the pre-war years he was also a secretary of the Republican league for electoral reform and a member of the executive council of the Peace Through Law Association.

=== World War I ===
Germany declared war on France on 3 August 1914 at the start of World War I (1914–18). As a deputy, Bokanowski was exempt from military service, but joined the army and in October 1914 was a second lieutenant of infantry on the Argonne front. He was assigned to the staff of the 42nd Division. In 1916 he was appointed to the General Staff of the Eastern Army under the command of General Maurice Sarrail, and was decorated with the Legion of Honour. After the sinking of the SS Provence on which he was travelling to his post by a torpedo, he was cited for the order of the army and the navy. In 1917 he was on the staff of the army corps of General Auguste Hirschauer, and participated in the Champagne offensive. He then returned to the Chamber of Deputies.

Bokanowski was appointed to the committees of the army and the budget. He was very active, focusing on economic activities, particularly on laws related to checks and patents, and also on questions of national defense. After the debate about the Bolo Pasha and "Bonnet rouge" affairs, the Chamber of Deputies adopted his resolution of confidence in the government of Paul Painlevé to deliver the full rigors of the law against anyone guilty of passing intelligence to the enemy or engaging in propaganda that would weaken the resistance of the nation. He also questioned "the action the Government intends to take to thwart the diplomatic maneuvers of Germany" and "the use of the economic weapon in the fight against Germany."

=== Post-war ===
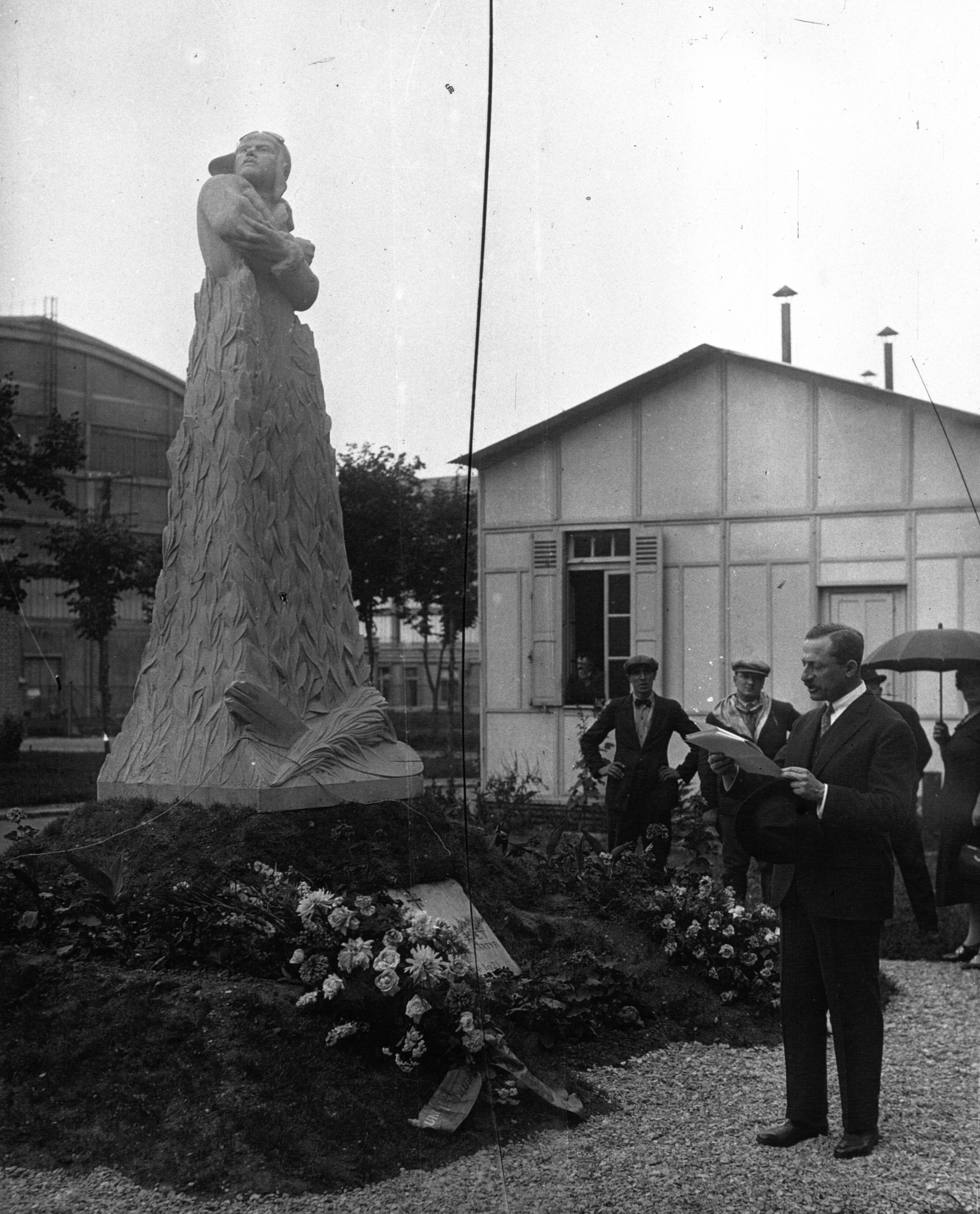
Bokanowski in 1927 inaugurating the memorial to the World War I flying ace Bernard Barny de Romanet

On 16 November 1919 Bokanowski was reelected in the Seine on the platform of the Union républicaine et sociale. He was appointed to the committees of finance and commerce and of industry. He distinguished himself as assistant Rapporteur-General and then as Rapporteur-General. He supported solid fiscal management and a balanced budget that did not depend on German reparations. He was in favor of raising indirect taxes, but also wanted to expand the base of direct taxation and improve its administration.

In 1921 Bokanowski was one of the founding members and a member of the directing committee of the National Association of Advocates. He was a member of the legal council of the Syndicat of Journalists and Writers. He founded a think tank the Union pour le franc. He became President of the Société des artistes décorateurs (1923).

On 29 March 1924 Raymond Poincaré made Bokanowski Minister of the Navy, a post he held until the cabinet resigned on 1 June 1924 after the elections. Bokanowski was reelected in the general elections of 11 May 1924 as a radical Republican. He joined the Left Democratic Republicans in the chamber, and resumed his positions on the committees of finance and commerce and of industry. He questioned the government several times on its financial policy. He was concerned both to balance the budget and to improve social conditions, particularly those of women and the family, During the financial crisis in 1925 he toured the country preaching confidence in the franc.

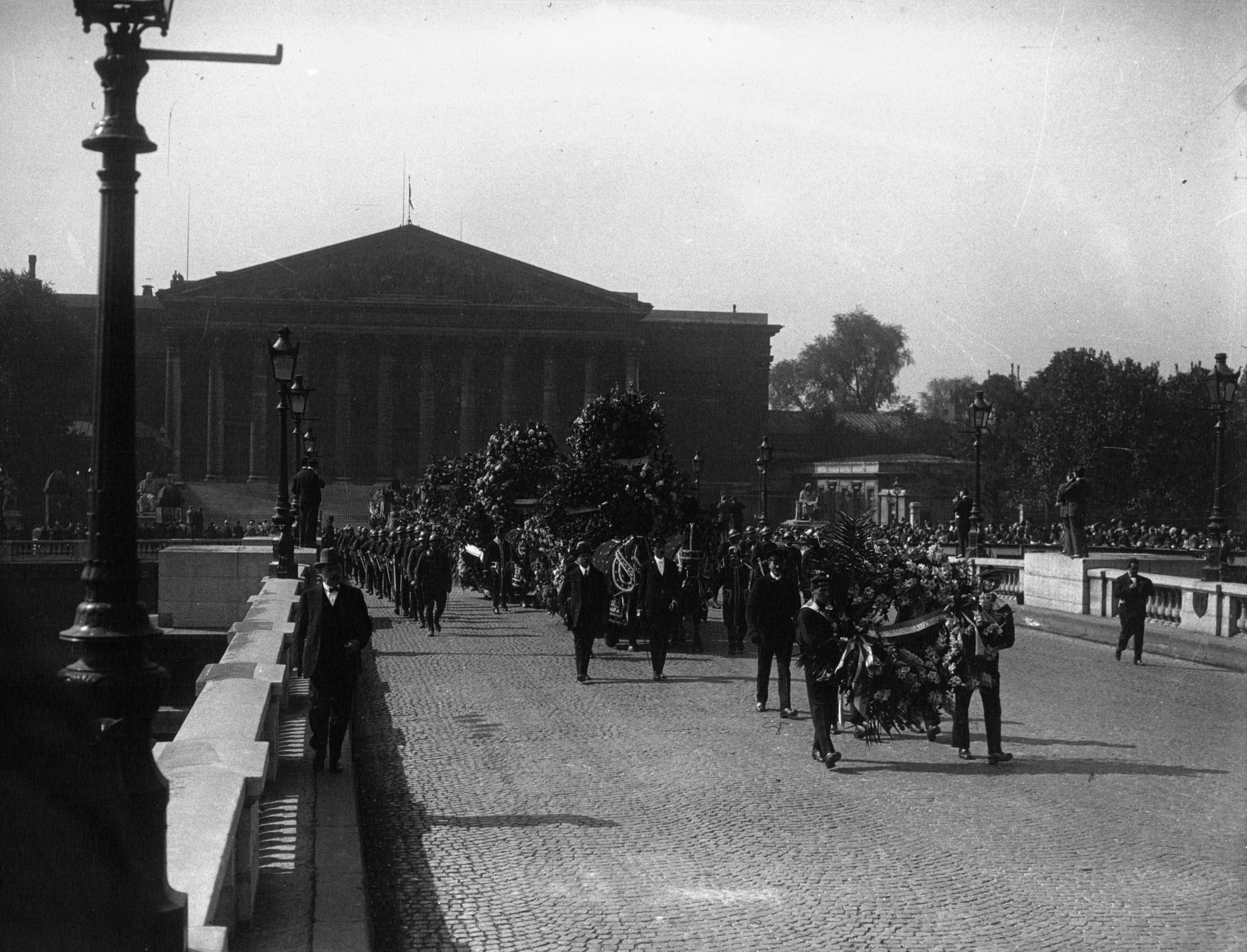
Bokanowski's funeral in 1928

The crisis was resolved when Raymond Poincaré returned to power in 1926. He gave Bokanowski the portfolio of Trade and Industry, and responsibility for Posts and Telegraphs and for Aviation. Bokanowski promoted a policy of balanced trade based on price monitoring and assistance to producers. He prepared a new tariff system to replace the unstable system of agreements and interim tariffs, and concluded the first post-war trade agreement with Germany. He clarified the broadcasting regulations, and proposed a much-needed reorganization of aviation in France. Bokanowski was reelected for the Republican left in the general elections of 22 April 1928 for the fifth district of Saint-Denis, and retained his ministerial position.

Maurice Bokanowski was killed on 2 September 1928 in an air accident when flying from Toul to an aviation meeting in Clermont-Ferrand. His son, Michel Maurice-Bokanowski (1912–2005), was also a leading French politician. His son was authorized to take the name "Maurice-Bokanowski" by a decree of 30 August 1928.

== Publications ==
Maurice Bokanowski's wartime journals describe his experiences as a soldier during World War One, and as a politician and statesman.

- Maurice Bokanowski (1 December 1914 – 11 June 1918), Carnets (in French), Ten notebooks, Assemblée Nationale

Maurice Bokanowski was also the author of the following works:

- Maurice Bokanowski (1908). Les commissions internationales d'enquête. Paris: A. Pedone.
- Maurice Bokanowski (1918). L' Etat héritier ... Paris: L'action nationale.
- Maurice Bokanowski (1918). Uniformisation des législations sur la propriété intellectuelle et industrielle. Rapport présenté au nom du Comité parlementaire français du commerce...à la Conférence parlementaire internationale du commerce à Londres (Juillet 1918). Paris: Com. parlem. franç. du commerce.
- Maurice Bokanowski (1919). Bolchevisme et misère. conférence de Maurice Bokanowski. Paris: Impr. centrale de la Bourse.
- Robert Wolff, Maurice Bokanowski (1921). Note sur la stabilisation du franc français. Paris.
- Robert Wolff, Maurice Bokanowski (1921). A Study in the stabilization of the French franc August 1921. Paris: impr. de Chaix.
- Maurice Bokanowski (1922). La Situation financière. discours prononcé par M. Maurice Bokanowski,... à la... Chambre des députés... 24 octobre 1922. Paris: impr. des Journaux officiels.
- Robert Wolff, Maurice Bokanowski (1922). Réflexions sur le déficit Octobre 1922. Paris: impr. de Chaix.
- Maurice Bokanowski (1925). La Crise-financière conséquence d'erreurs monétaires. Discours prononcé par M. Maurice Bokanowski, Député de la Seine, à la séance de la Chambre des députés du mercredi 18 novembre 1925. Paris: Impr. des Journaux officiels.
- Maurice Bokanowski, Edmond Laskine (1925). Commentaire pratique de la nouvelle loi de finances du 13 juillet 1925 dispositions fiscales. Paris: Libr. des jurisclasseurs.
- Maurice Bokanowski (1925). Le Problème financier restaurer la confiance. Discours prononcé... à la séance de la Chambre des députés du mardi 3 novembre 1925. Paris: Imp. des Journaux officiels.
- Maurice Bokanowski (1926). Discours à la 2è séance de la chambre des députés du samedi 30 Janvier 1926; Pas de salut financier sans la confiance, pas de confiance sans l'Union. Paris: impr. des Journaux Officiels.
- Séance spéciale tenue à l'occasion du cinquantenaire de la fondation du Bureau international des Poids et mesures, le mercredi 5 octobre 1927. Discours de M. Emile Picard,... M. Charles-Edouard Guillaume,... M. Maurice Bokanowski,...]; Institut de France, Académie des Sciences. Paris: Palais de l'Institut. 1927.

== Sources ==
- "Bokanowski, Maurice (1879-1928)". IdRef (Identifiants et Référentiels).
- Gaget, Olivier (27 March 2014). "Moïse Maurice Bokanowski. - Un deputé dans les tranchées". Les Poilus juifs d'un régiment provençal: Le 112e d'infanterie dans la Grande Guerre. Editions Publibook. ISBN 978-2-342-02108-0.
- Jolly, Jean (1960). "Maurice BOKANOWSKI". Dictionnaire des parlementaires français de 1889 à 1940 (in French). Presses universitaires de France. ISBN 2-1100-1998-0.
- Schweitz, Arlette (2001). "BOKANOWSKI Moïse dit Maurice". Les parlementaires de la Seine sous la Troisième République: Etudes. Publications de la Sorbonne. ISBN 978-2-85944-432-7.
