= Charles Humbert =

French politician (1866–1927)

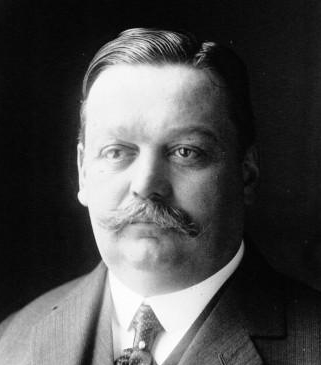
- Charles Humbert in 1913
- Born: May 28, 1866; Loison, Meuse, France
- Died: November 1, 1927 (aged 61); Paris, France
- Occupations: Politician and journalist

Charles Humbert (28 May 1866, Loison, Meuse – 1 November 1927) was a French army captain, tax collector, senator and newspaper proprietor.

== Biography ==
Humbert's mother was a domestic servant Marie Clémentine Duchet, and he was first given her surname, Duchet; but his name was changed when his mother married Casimir Humbert in 1868. His father died a year later.

Humbert was a self-made man. His first job was in a café, but he enlisted himself in the army and became a captain. He attracted the attention of General André who made him his aide-de-camp, and in 1900, when André became Minister for War, he received a post under him. He played an important part in the series of inquiries instigated by General André into the religious and political views of officers. After two years he resigned owing to the controversy caused by his opposition to Freemasonry in the army, and became a tax collector. He entered journalism, becoming secretary to "Le Matin". In 1906 he was elected deputy for the Meuse Département, then two years later a senator of the Third Republic, becoming vice-president of the senate army commission. Before World War I he wrote much on military subjects, and made speeches criticising the inadequacy of the defences of the French Army, and the insufficiency of officers and munitions. When the war began in 1914 he became director of "Le Journal". His slogan was "Des canons, des munitions!" He was awarded the Légion d'honneur.

=== Bolo Pasha Trial ===
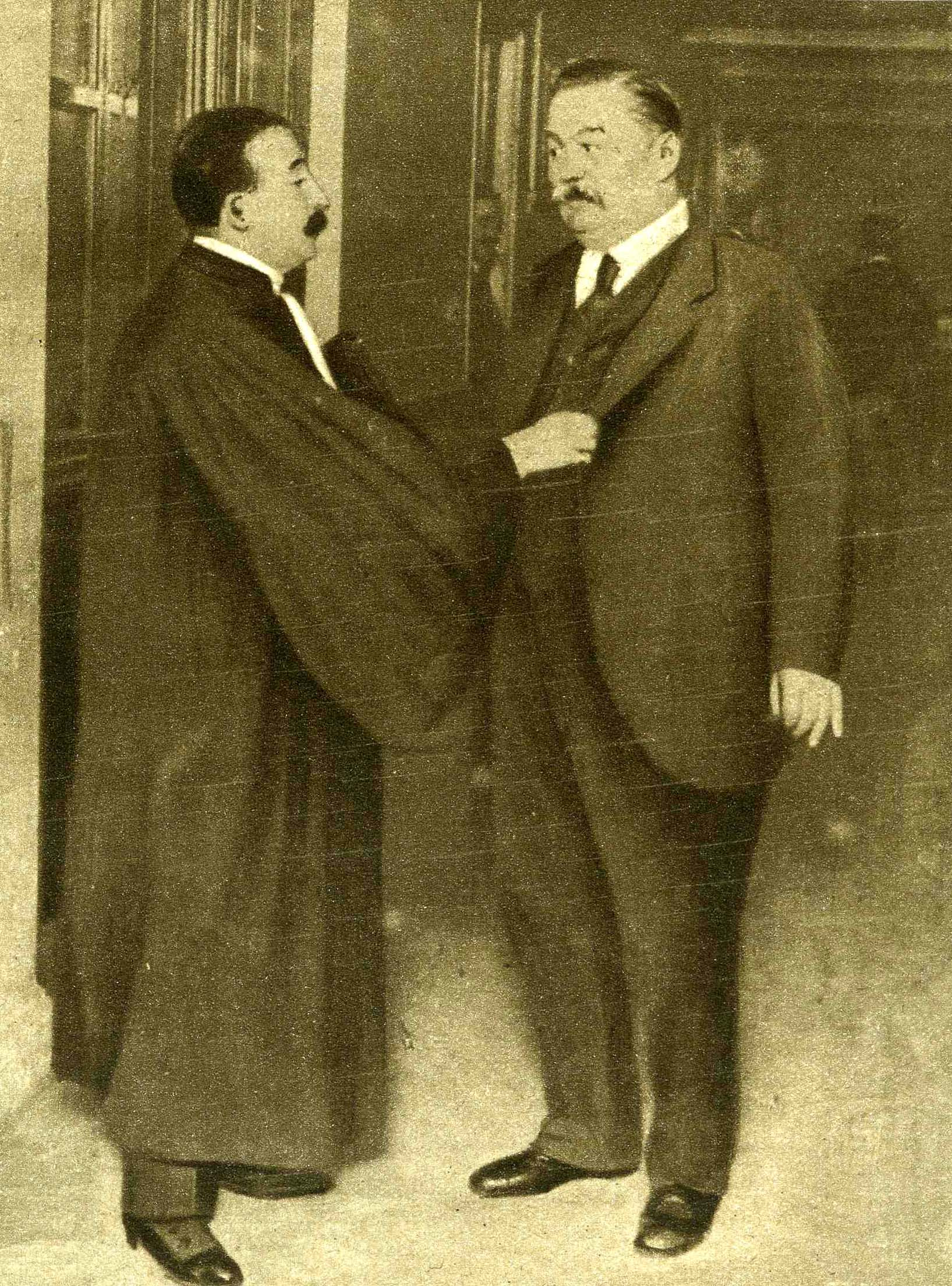
Senator Charles Humbert (right) and his lawyer M^{e} Moro-Giafferi during trial

In the spring of 1918 Humbert was involved in a controversy involving money supplied to "Le Journal" and proposals by Bolo Pasha who had been executed in the war as a German agent. In a much-publicised case, Humbert was brought before a Court-martial but was acquitted.

=== Family ===
Humbert was a sub-lieutenant in the 119th Infantry garrisoned in Dieppe when he married an Englishwoman, Mabel Wells Annie Rooke, daughter of William Rooke and Fanny Drew, and granddaughter of Joseph Drew. They had one son, Charles William Humbert, and one daughter, Agnès Humbert, born in Dieppe in 1894. Humbert and his wife divorced in 1908, and he then married Marie Levylier (née Nathan, 1872–1920). He died at his home in Paris on 1 November 1927, and is buried in Batignolles Cemetery.

== Writings ==
- Sommes-nous défendus? ("Are we defended?") (1907)
- La flotte fantôme: ni bateaux, ni canons, ni obus ("The phantom fleet: no ships, no guns, no shells") (1909)
- L'œuvre française aux colonies, Paris, Larousse (1913, reprinted 2013) ISBN 978-2012899964

== Bibliography ==
All books written in French

- Jean El Gammal, François Roth, Jean-Claude Delbriel, Dictionnaire des parlementaires lorrains de la Troisième République, Éd. Serpenoise, Metz, 2006, 422 p. ISBN 2-87692-620-2
- Jean André Faucher et Noël Jacquemart, Le Quatrième pouvoir, la presse française de 1830 à 1960, L'Écho de la presse et de la publicité, Saint-Germain l'Auxerrois, 1969, p. 69-70
- Lucien Graux, Les fausses nouvelles de la grande guerre, t. 1, L'Édition française illustrée, 1919
- Marie Roux, Le défaitisme et les manoeuvres proallemandes 1914-1917, Nouvelle librairie nationale, 1918, 128 p.
- Léon Schirmann, Les manipulations judiciaires de la Grande Guerre : comment on fabrique des coupables, Éditions Italiques, Triel-sur-Seine, 2006, 292 p. ISBN 2-910536-65-3
- Jacques Chabannes, Les Scandales de la Troisième, de Panama à Stavisky, Perrin, 1972, 347 p.
