= Gérard Théry =

French engineer (1933–2021)

- Born: 25 February 1933; Sallaumines, France
- Died: 18 July 2021 (aged 88); Paris, France
- Occupation: Engineer

Gérard Théry (25 February 1933 – 18 July 2021) was a French engineer and computer scientist. He was Directeur générale des Télécommunications from 1974 to 1981 and President of the Cité des Sciences et de l'Industrie from 1996 to 1998. He was a founding member of the Télétel program and Minitel. He once stated that the internet was "ill-suited to the provision of commercial services", which was proven to be incorrect. He was also responsible for the French government's program against the Year 2000 problem from 1998 to 2000.

== Biography ==
Théry graduated from the École Polytechnique in 1952 and the Télécom Paris in 1957. In 1955, he began working for the Ministry of Postes, Télégraphes et Téléphones, serving as an aide to Minister Jacques Marette from 1966 to 1967. He started his career working on submarine cables, participating in numerous cable-laying campaigns by AT&T between Perpignan and Oran. He also helped lay the first electric submarine cable in the English Channel. He joined the Centre national d'études des télécommunications in 1962 and helped Bell Labs develop the first echo suppressors for a communications satellite.

On 16 October 1974, Théry was appointed Directeur générale des Télécommunications, becoming responsible for the French telephone development program, Delta LP. He also helped France replace its system of crossbar switches with the telephone exchange. In 1976, he and his team launched one of the first packet switching data networks, Transpac, which enjoyed great success upon its opening on 14 December 1978. That year, Télétel and Minitel were launched, both of which remained until 2012, when they were finally closed by France Télécom. In 1979, the Telecom 1 satellite was launched. Théry was ousted from his position on 17 August 1981 due to the fact that he was considered to be too close to President Valéry Giscard d'Estaing.

In 1984, Théry joined the Société Générale, where he was appointed a member of the executive committee. He was chosen by TF1 and TDF Group to be an amicable expert on relieving contention between the two companies. In 1989, he was appointed to the executive committee of Renault, where he also became head of the IT department. In 1994, he was commissioned by the French government for the famous report "Autoroutes de l'Information", in which he made his infamous quote against the future of the internet. The prediction error is often mocked in social networks and taken as a dictionary-definition example of prediction errors and their causes. He served as President of the Cité des Sciences et de l'Industrie, serving until 1998.

In 1998, Théry created the film Gérard Théry et Associés, specializing in telecommunications and information technology consulting. At the same time he also collaborated with Dassault Group on the development of an electric car. On 20 February 1998, the French government appointed him to lead the mission against the Year 2000 problem.

Gérard Théry died in Paris on 18 July 2021 at the age of 88.

== Distinctions ==
- Officer of the Legion of Honour (1986)
- Commander of the Ordre national du Mérite (1993)
