= Henry Simon (politician) =

French politician

Louis Henry Simon
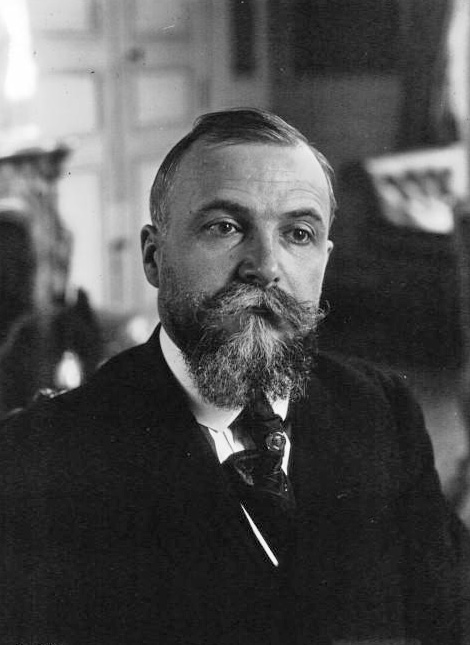
- Simon in 1917

Minister of the Colonies
- In office 16 November 1917 – 18 January 1920
- Prime Minister: Georges Clemenceau
- Preceded by: René Besnard
- Succeeded by: Albert Sarraut

Personal details
- Born: 20 May 1874 Labruguière, Tarn, France
- Died: 2 December 1926 (aged 52) Paris, France
- Occupation: Industrialist

Louis Henry Simon (20 May 1874 – 2 December 1926) was a French industrialist, a radical socialist, who was a deputy from 1910 to 1926, and Minister of the Colonies from 1917 to 1920.

== Early years ==
Louis Henry Simon was born on 20 May 1874 in Labruguière, Tarn. He was an industrialist and radical socialist. He was elected deputy for the 1st district of Castres, Tarn on 8 May 1910 in the second round. He joined the committees on economies and on Foreign Affairs, Protectorates & Colonies. He was narrowly reelected in the 1914 elections, and joined the committees on Foreign Affairs, Protectorates & Colonies, on Budget and on Education & Fine Arts. At the start of World War I (1914–18) Simon was called up for military service as a sergeant in the 127th Territorial Infantry Regiment. On 9 February 1915 he was promoted to lieutenant and assigned to the 39th Infantry Regiment.

== Minister of Colonies ==
Simon was appointed Minister of the Colonies in the second cabinet of Georges Clemenceau, and held office from 16 November 1917 to 18 January 1920. His two main thrusts were to develop the colonial economies and to maintain banks in the colonies with the right of issue. At the start of March 1919 Simon met Lord Milner of Britain to discuss dividing up the German colonies. He made a request for all of Togo, but settled on just getting Lomé and the railways. (Note: The remainder of German Togo became British Togoland, later merged with the Gold Coast colony to become Ghana.) He was less willing to cede territory from Cameroon, although he was willing to let the British have all of German Borno. On the question of land redistribution in the Middle East, Simon delegated responsibility to members of a commission. At the Versailles Peace Conference Simon opposed the new colonies that France had acquired from Germany being administered as mandates.

== Later career ==
In the elections of 1919 Simon was elected for the Parti républicain radical et radical socialiste at the head of the list for the Union démocratique républicaine. He joined to committees on Foreign Affairs and on Customs. During this period he became president of the General Council. He was reelected in 1924. He died unexpectedly in Paris on 2 December 1926.

== Sources ==
- Jolly, Jean (1960–77). "Simon, Henry". Dictionnaire des parlementaires français de 1889 à 1940 (in French). ISBN 2-1100-1998-0.
- Joseph, Richard (1974). "The Royal Pretender: Prince Douala Manga Bell in Paris, 1919-1922 (Un prétendant royal: le prince Douala Manga Bell à Paris, 1919-1922)". Cahiers d'Études Africaines. 14, Cahier 54 (54). EHESS: 339–358. doi:10.3406/cea.1974.2648. JSTOR 4391310.
- Thomas, Martin (2005). The French Empire Between the Wars: Imperialism, Politics and Society. Manchester University Press. ISBN 978-0-7190-6518-7.
- Yearwood, Peter J. (1993). ""In a Casual Way with a Blue Pencil": British Policy and the Partition of Kamerun, 1914-1919". Canadian Journal of African Studies. 27 (2). Taylor & Francis, Ltd. on behalf of the Canadian Association of African Studies: 218–244. doi:10.2307/486060. JSTOR 486060.
