= Bolo Pasha =

French traitor (1867–1918)

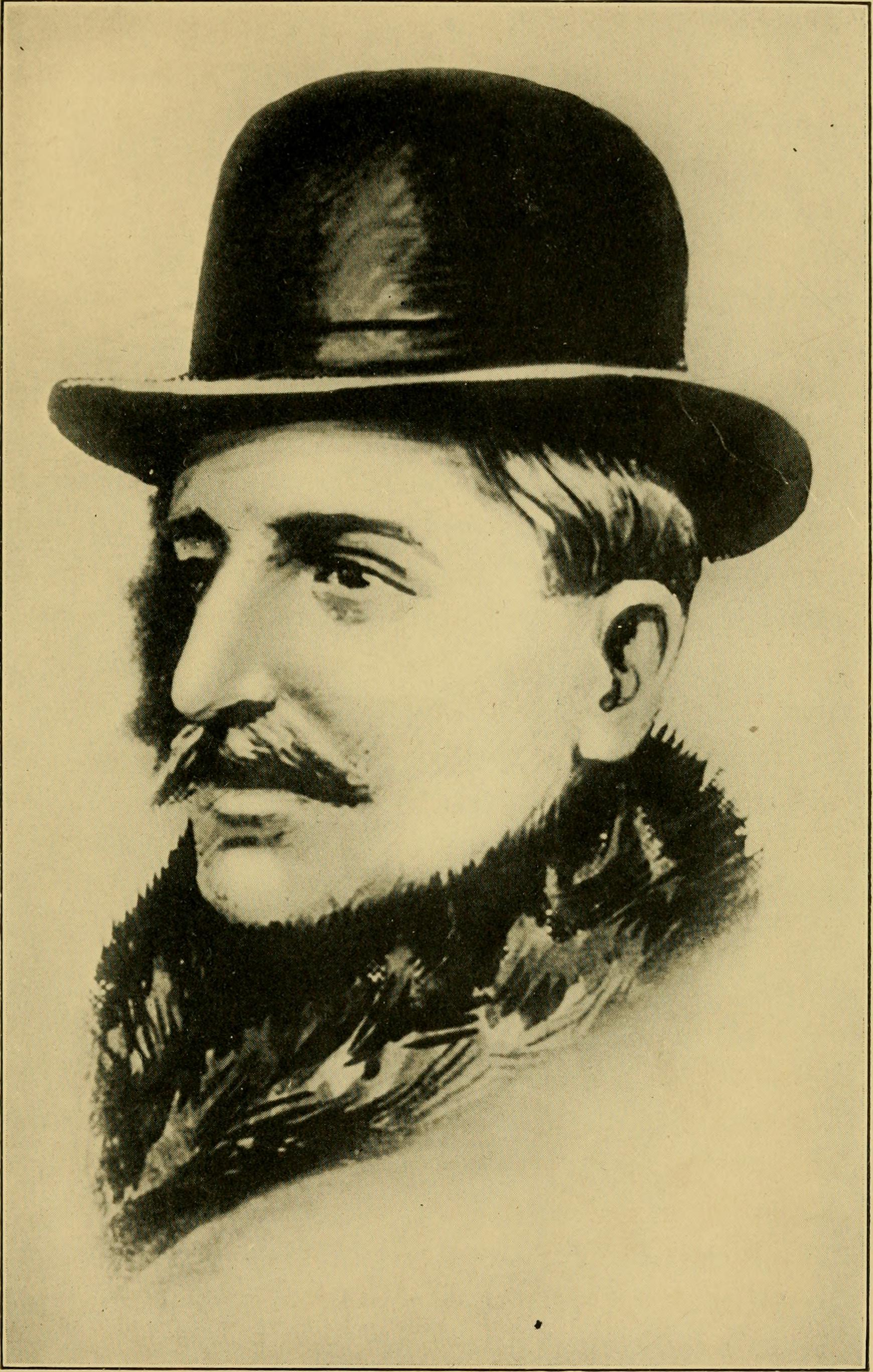
Portrait of Bolo Pasche as depicted in Celebrated spies and famous mysteries of the great war (1919) by George Barton

Bolo Pasha, originally named Paul Bolo, (September 24, 1867 – April 17, 1918) was a Frenchman who was a Levantine financer, traitor, and a German agent. The New York Times wrote that he "circumnavigated the globe, engaged in various curious occupations, participated in many shady schemes." The French secret police and Scotland Yard failed to collect enough evidence to convict him of treason, but he was eventually convicted with the help of evidence collected by the New York Attorney General. He was executed by firing squad on April 17, 1918.

== Early life ==
Paul Bolo was born in Marseille, the younger brother of "an eloquent French prelate". He changed occupations frequently. His first place of employment was a barber's shop where he worked as an assistant. After a few months, he became the owner of a small soap shop. His soap business eventually failed and so he decided to sell lobsters. The lobster sales were large, but expenses were greater than the income and the venture failed. He then left Marseille and became involved with a silk manufacturing company in Lyon. He later managed a photographic shop, but this business also was short-lived.

Bolo's next sojourn was in Paris where he quickly became "a man about town". He was easy-going and intelligent and became a frequent guest in the "convivial circles" of Paris. He married a woman who was older and much richer than he was; she died and left her fortune to him, and he went to Egypt.

== Travel to Egypt and beyond ==
Bolo was an adventurer, and Egypt was considered to be "the Mecca of adventurers" at that time. A multicultural country appealed to this inquisitive Frenchman.

Almost as soon as Bolo arrived in Egypt he sought a meeting with the ruler, Abbas Hilmi, the last Khedive of Egypt and Sudan. Hilmi, who spoke fluent French, was as eager to meet with Europeans visiting Cairo as they were eager to meet with him. Bolo and Hilmi liked each other from the first meeting. They met frequently, and at one of those meetings, Bolo was presented with the title of Pasha. Paul Bolo thus became Bolo Pasha.

Bolo accompanied Hilmi on various outings: to a petrified forest and on boat trips along the Nile, with richly decorated boats. Bolo and Hilmi were seen together, visiting the statue of the Sphinx, the pyramids and the Mosque of Muhammad Ali, which is situated in the Citadel of Cairo. Gradually Bolo became an intimate friend of Hilmi, and as such he was present at some unusual court ceremonies, some of which he planned himself. One was a reception for a Consul-General from one of the European countries.

This was a carefree time in Bolo's life, but Hilmi had foreseen trouble. Hilmi thought he was about to be deposed, and he knew his country's history: a deposed Khedive would not be admired. Hilmi decided to use his friend Bolo to help him save as much as possible of his fortune. Newspaper articles of the time preserve this history:

In November, 1914, in an effort to prevent the permanent sequestration of the ex-Khedive's property in Egypt, Bolo sent an Italian friend to Constantinople, where Abbas then was, with two letters. One was to the effect that Abbas owed Bolo $10,000,000, and the other was a promise by Bolo to refund the money. Bolo then arranged a meeting with Sadik Pasha, counselor to Abbas Hilmi, at Rome for February 1, 1915, and he thereupon proposed to Abbas' representative a plan for the establishment of a bank in Switzerland, which was in reality to be used for the dissemination of German propaganda. Bolo and Sadik Pasha went to Vienna to meet Abbas Hilmi, who refused to consider the scheme. Bolo thereupon made an alternative proposal to the effect that he purchase an interest in some of the leading newspapers of France, at the same time guaranteeing the publication of a number of articles favorable to the German cause.

Abbas Hilmi is said to have favored the last proposition, and after a conference with Count Monts, the former German Ambassador to Rome, dispatched Sadik Pasha to Berlin to propose the project to Foreign Minister von Jagow. Von Jagow is said to have agreed and offered to provide 10,000,000 marks to be paid in ten monthly instalments. A brief time after that Abbas Hilmi, accompanied by Chefik Pasha, arrived at the Hotel Savoy, Zurich, where Bolo and Commandatore Cavallini already were installed. It is noteworthy that at the same time Bolo and his party were at the Hotel Savoy, Herr Erzberger, leader of the German party, was at the Hotel du Saint Gothard, and that Bolo introduced him to many of his friends. The next day at a conference at the Savoy, Bolo was said to have accepted Von Jagow's proposal of 10,000,000 marks monthly, to be paid through the ex-Khedive.

The story has it that on March 21, 1915, the former Egyptian ruler received the first instalment through the Dresden Bank and sent it to an agent in Italy to be paid to Bolo. The French spy refused to accept the money in that way and arrangements were thereupon made to have the money deposited in a Geneva bank, where Bolo represented it to be a part of the personal fortune of Abbas Hilmi.

Bolo found himself suspected because of his frequent trips between Paris and Geneva. During March 1915, Bolo met with Hilmi in Switzerland. Apparently Bolo was given $2,500,000 to be used to pay the French media in order to influence the public to accept peace with Germany.

== Travel to United States ==
On February 22, 1916, Bolo arrived in New York City. He spent almost a month there, leaving on March 17, 1916. During the time he spent in New York, Bolo tried to avoid being seen in the company of German agents, but he traveled to Washington, DC, for a secret meeting with Count Johann Heinrich von Bernstorff, the German ambassador in Washington to the United States.

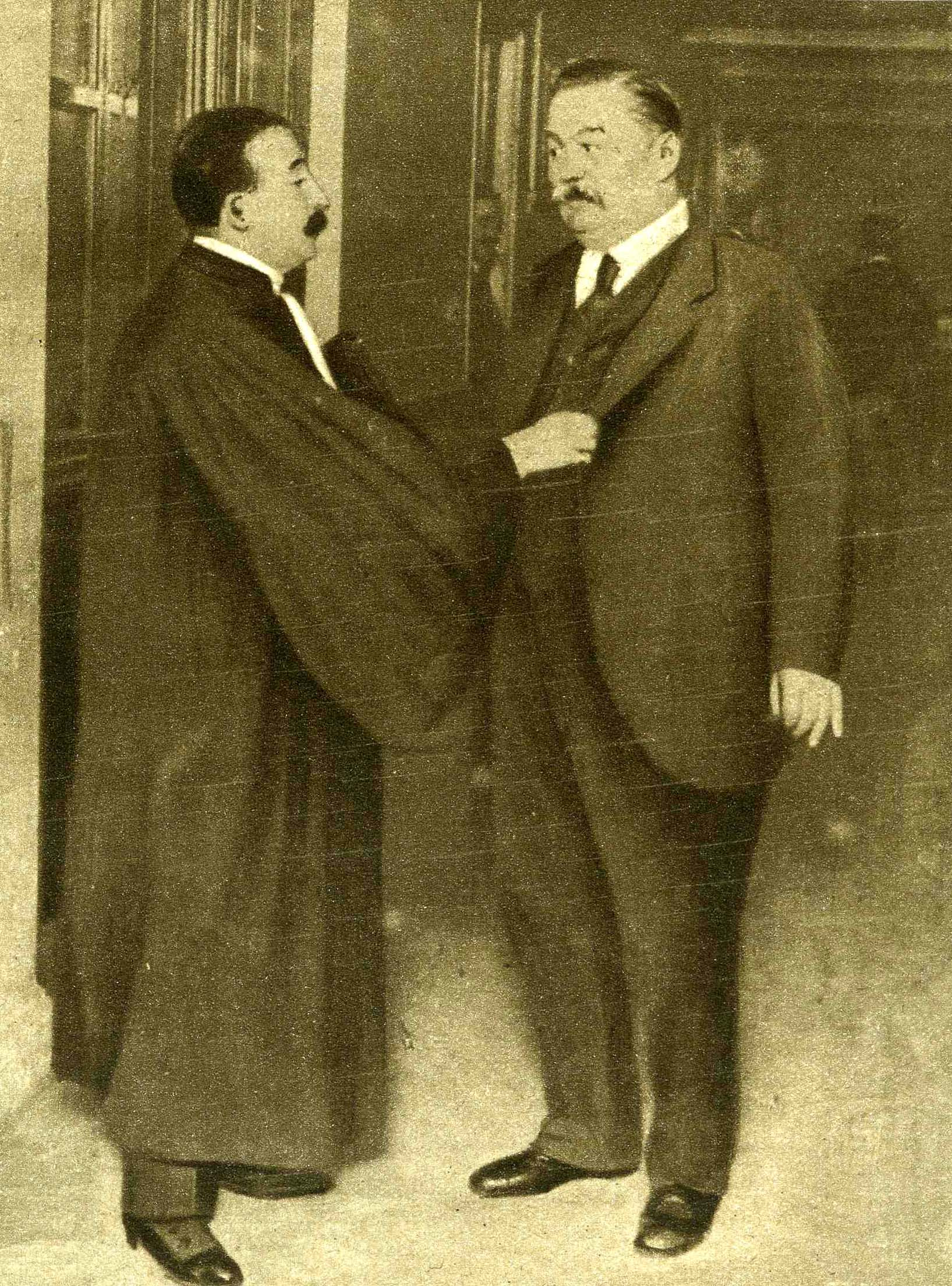
Senator Charles Humbert (right) and his lawyer M^{e} Moro-Giafferi during Bolo's trial.

Von Bernstorff masterminded an operation to organize German sabotage in the U.S. He was assisted by the Military Attaché Captain Franz von Papen, who purchased an established New York import/export firm, G. Amsinck & Co., to act as an intermediary for the financing of German espionage and sabotage in the US and launder the financial transactions. In 1915 von Bernstorff and Bolo had devised a scheme to destabilise the French war effort by corrupting the French press in order to force an early armistice with Germany. The Paris newspaper Le Journal, owned by Senator Charles Humbert, was to be one of the papers to carry misleading 'fake news'.

The banking firm Muller, Schall and Company acted for the pair and used G. Amsinck & Co. as a front to facilitate the transfer of $1,700,000 to fund the subterfuge. Amsinck and Co. had also arranged payments to the men who attempted to sabotage the Welland Canal in 1916. Von Papen was expelled from the US in December 1915 after various unexplained sabotage incidents and explosions. G. Amsinck & Co.'s involvement was finally exposed when the US declared war on Germany on 6 April 1917 and the US severed diplomatic relations. This led to raids by the FBI on various business premises including Deutsche Bank, and the Bolo connection was discovered. Amsinck was mostly purged of its German connections and staff, and re-organised as G. Amsinck & Co., Inc.

When the French government appealed to the governor of New York asking for help in collecting evidence against Bolo, Merton E. Lewis, the Attorney General of New York State, was assigned to the case. He collected some "sensational" evidence:

The evidence, which included photographic reproductions of many telltale checks, letters, and telegrams, revealed the fact that Count Bernstorff, then German Ambassador at Washington, had eagerly fallen in with Bolo's proposition to betray France by corrupting the press in favor of a premature peace and had advanced him the enormous sum of $1,683,500 to finance the plot. The State Department and Ambassador Jusserand examined the evidence and attested its genuineness.

One of the most important pieces of evidence was the letter Bolo wrote to the New York City branch of the Royal Bank of Canada on March 14, 1916:

Gentlemen: You will receive from Messrs. Amsinck & Co. deposits for the credit of my account with you, which deposits will reach the aggregate amount of about $1,700,000, which I wish you to utilize in the following manner:

First—Immediately on receipt of the first amount on account of this sum pay to Messrs. J. P. Morgan & Co., New York City, the sum of $170,068.03, to be placed to the credit of the account with them of Senator Charles Humbert, Paris.

Second—Establish on your books a credit of $5,000, good until the 31st of May, In favor of Jules Bois, Biltmore Hotel, this amount to be utilized by him at the debit of my account according to his needs, and the unused balance to be returned to me.

Third—Transfer to the credit of my wife, Mme. Bolo, with agency T of Comptoir National d'Escompte de Paris a sum of about $524,000, to be debited to my account as such transfers are made by you at best rate and by small amounts.

Fourth—You will hold, subject to my instructions, when all payments are complete, a balance of not less than $1,000,000.

Yours truly, BOLO PASHA

== Arrest and trial ==
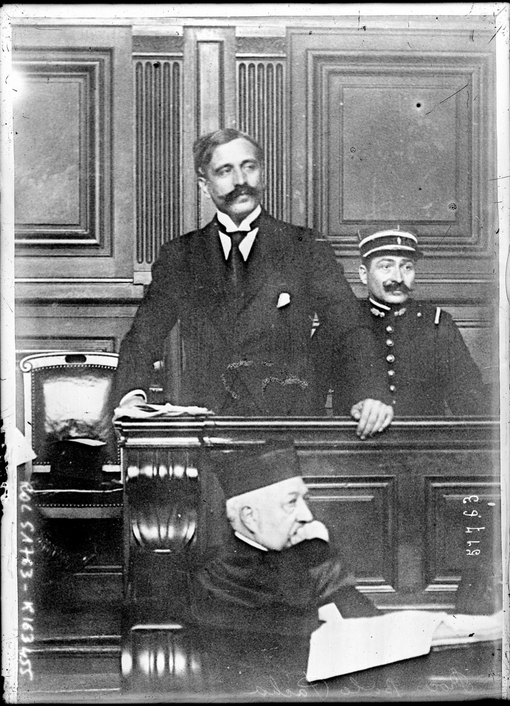
Bolo photographed at his trial

Bolo was arrested in Paris on September 29, 1917, and held in Fresnes Prison. He was tried at court-martial (France was under a military government during the war) and was charged with treason. Bolo exclaimed:

I am no traitor. I have asked to be judged, and I am willing to die, but not as a traitor!

When asked why he never kept records of his money transfers, Bolo responded: "I am the master of money, not its slave!"

Abbas Hilmi was summoned as a witness, but he failed to arrive in Paris. However, Bolo's second wife was a strong witness on his behalf, as was his brother. Senator Charles Humbert, whom Bolo had mentioned in his letter to the Royal Bank of Canada on March 14, 1916, was summoned as a witness. The senator testified that "he never suspected for a moment that there was any hidden motive in the deal for the bonds of the newspaper."

In his last appeal to the court, Albert Salles, Bolo's attorney, said:

Do not condemn Bolo Pasha to satisfy public opinion. Do not condemn him to satisfy public passion. Please do not permit yourselves to be the cause of a miscarriage of justice that will be bitterly regretted in after years.

Salles' speech was to no avail. The court convicted Bolo and sentenced him to death. The conviction was based on circumstantial evidence, and the decision was made after only 15 minutes of deliberation.

Bolo Pasha was executed by firing squad at the Fort Neuf de Vincennes on the morning of April 17, 1918.

After the execution, Georges Clemenceau, the Prime Minister of France, addressed the American people:

This Bolo Pasha, who had had his way with everybody and in almost every situation, had met a strong man at last! Bolo Pasha was one of those gentlemen who began life by betraying women; he ended it by betraying nations. There is a great difference between betraying women and betraying nations! Women forgive and forget, but nations never, never! And so at the conclusion of their little interview Mr. Clemenceau escorted Bolo Pasha to the Forest of Vincennes, and placing him with his back to a wall, compelled him to face the business end of twelve French rifles. Bolo Pasha will never betray another nation. I want to tell you Americans that that is the only way to treat a traitor!

== In fiction ==
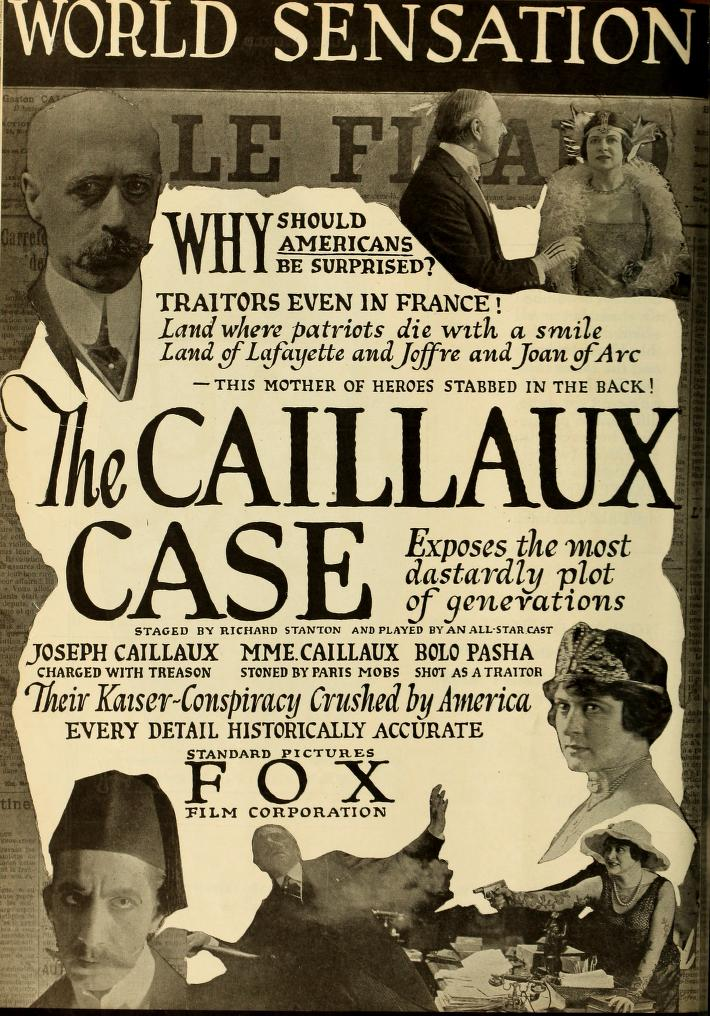
1918 ad for The Caillaux Case in Motion Picture World

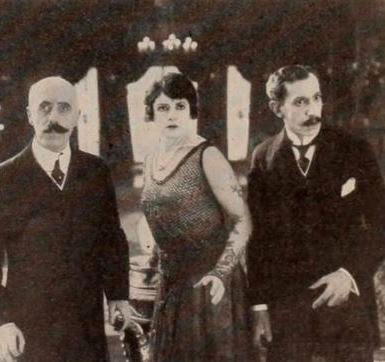
Majeroni (right) in The Caillaux Case (1918)

A fictionalized version of Bolo Pasha appeared in the 1918 American silent film The Caillaux Case directed by Richard Stanton and released by Fox Film just a month after Bolo's execution. He was played by the Australian actor George Majeroni.

== See also ==
- Hotel Cecil, London, nicknamed "House of Bolo"
