= Jacques Marette =

French politician

Jacques Henri Marette

Minister of Posts and Telecommunications
- In office 15 April 1962 – 1 April 1967
- Preceded by: Michel Maurice-Bokanowski
- Succeeded by: Yves Guéna

Personal details
- Born: 21 September 1922 Paris, France
- Died: 25 April 1984 (aged 61) Paris, France
- Occupation: Politician

Jacques Henri Marette (21 September 1922 – 25 April 1984) was a French politician who was Minister of Posts and Telecommunications for five years in the 1960s.

== Early years ==
Jacques Henri Marette was born to a wealthy family in the 16th arrondissement of Paris on 21 September 1922. His older sister Françoise (1908–1988), who became Françoise Dolto by marriage, was a noted French pediatrician and psychoanalyst. Jacques Marette studied at Le Cours Hattemer, a private school, then was admitted to the Faculty of Law of Paris, and also attended the Free School of Political Sciences. During World War II (1939–45) he joined the "Thermopyles" French Resistance network while still a student. In 1944 he was appointed to the steering committee of the Mouvement de libération nationale (MLN) and was the MLN assistant secretary-general in the Paris region. After the war Marette became a journalist at France-Soir and Combat. For a period he represented Radiodiffusion-Télévision Française (RTF) in Germany.

== Political career ==
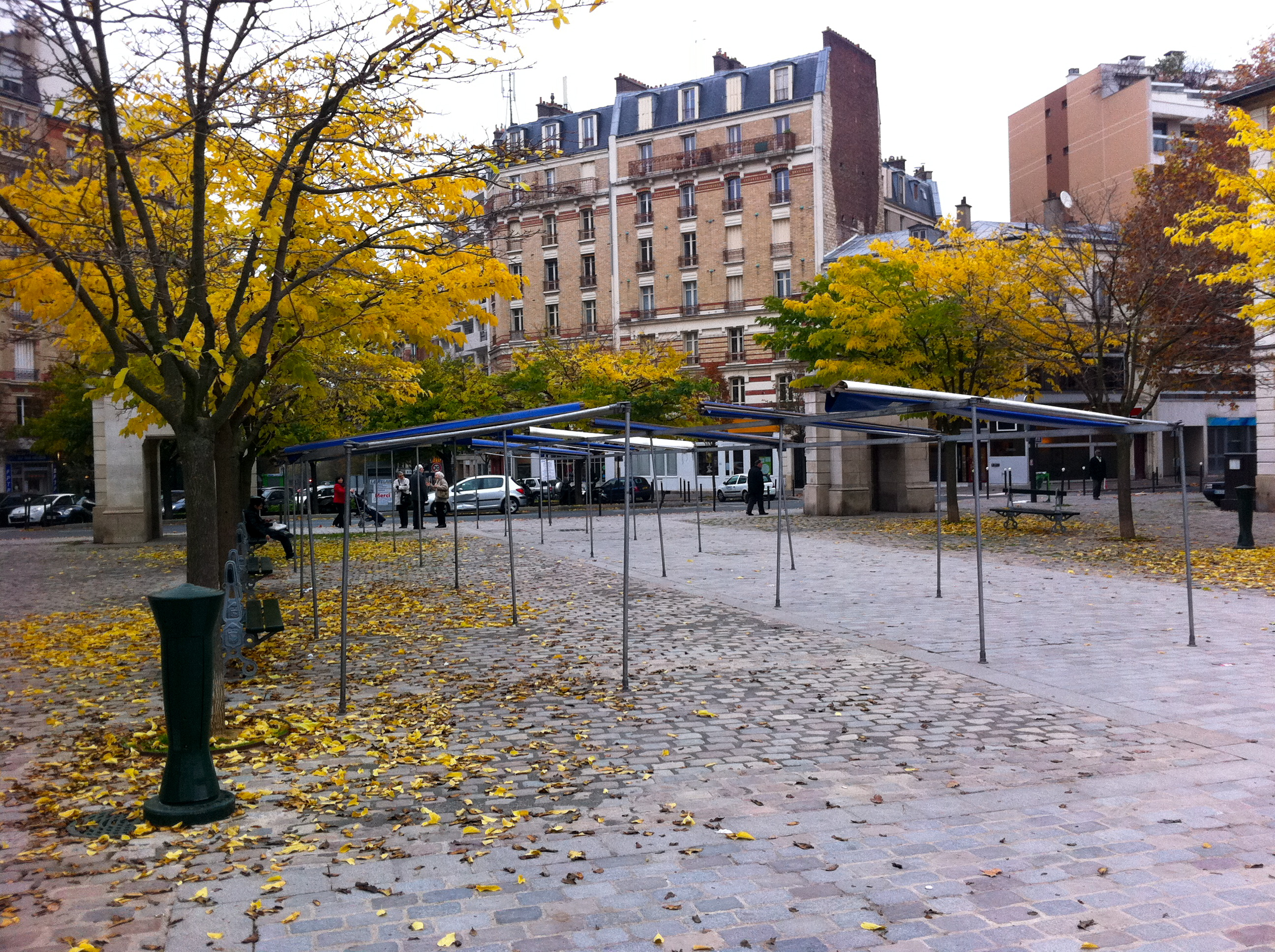
Place Jacques-Marette in the 15th arrondissement of Paris

In the Spring of 1947 Marette joined the Rassemblement du peuple français (RPF) when it was founded by General Charles de Gaulle. He became chief of staff to Jacques Baumel, former secretary general of the MLN and now responsible for professional and social action in the Gaullist movement. Until 1949 Marette directed the Rassemblement ouvrier (Worker's Rally), the RPF newspaper for workers. He then took responsibility for all RPF publications. He also worked for the RPF in the Toulouse region, and was a member of the RPF national council. Marette was among the many employees that the RPF was forced to dismiss in 1952 due to lack of funding. He worked as a business manager for various industrial companies until 1958.

When General de Gaulle returned to power, Marette obtained a position from June 1958 to January 1959 as technical adviser to Édouard Ramonet, Minister of Industry and Commerce. He joined the Union pour la Nouvelle République (UNR) when it was founded in the fall of 1958, and was deputy secretary general of the UNR from October 1958 to March 1961, responsible for relations with parliament and the press. Marette and Jacques Baumel assisted the UNR secretary general Roger Frey in choosing the UNR candidates for the legislative elections of 23 November 1958. Most candidates were selected for their loyalty to de Gaulle. Marette was political director of the Courrier de la Nouvelle République from 1959.

Marette was elected municipal counselor for the 9th sector of Paris in March 1959, and in April 1959 took a seat in the Senate as substitute for Edmond Michelet, who had been appointed Minister of Justice. He left the Senate in the spring of 1962. When Georges Pompidou formed his government Marette replaced Michel Maurice-Bokanowski as Minister of Posts and Telecommunications. Marette ran successfully for election to the Senate for the 17th district of the Seine in November 1962, but resigned his seat to Bernard Rocher so he could remain in the government. Marette was Minister of Posts and Telecommunications from 15 April 1962 to 1 April 1967.

On 10 July 1962 a NASA rocket put the Telstar communications satellite into low Earth orbit. The satellite was not stationary relative to the Earth's surface, but orbited every 2 hours and 37 minutes. This reduced the length of time when satellite programs could be seen in both Europe and the US to fifteen minutes. Marette took the opportunity of the first test to make an unscheduled broadcast. This was followed by a recorded variety program starring Yves Montand. Marette had broken an agreement with the BBC to limit the first broadcast to a test pattern and sound, and the result was a major dispute between the broadcasters. On 24 November 1965 Marette made the first dialed telephone call from France to Britain, where he talked to Tony Benn, his counterpart.

Marette left the Ministry on 1 April 1967. He was Deputy for Paris from 1967 to 1984. Jacques Marette died in Paris on 25 April 1984.

== Sources ==
- Benn, Tony (2012-10-31). Out Of The Wilderness: Diaries 1963-67. Random House. ISBN 978-1-4464-9372-4.
- Berstein, Serge (1993-04-01). The Republic of de Gaulle 1958-1969. Cambridge University Press. ISBN 978-0-521-25239-3.
- Hall, Guy; Hivernel, Francoise; Morgan, Sian (2009-11-04). Theory and Practice in Child Psychoanalysis: An Introduction to the Work of Francoise Dolto. Karnac Books. ISBN 978-1-78049-344-2.
- Højbjerg, Lennard; Søndergaard, Henrik (2006). European Film and Media Culture. Museum Tusculanum Press. ISBN 978-87-635-0427-0.
- "Jacques MARETTE". Assemblée nationale.
