= Émile Deschanel =

French author and politician (1819–1904)

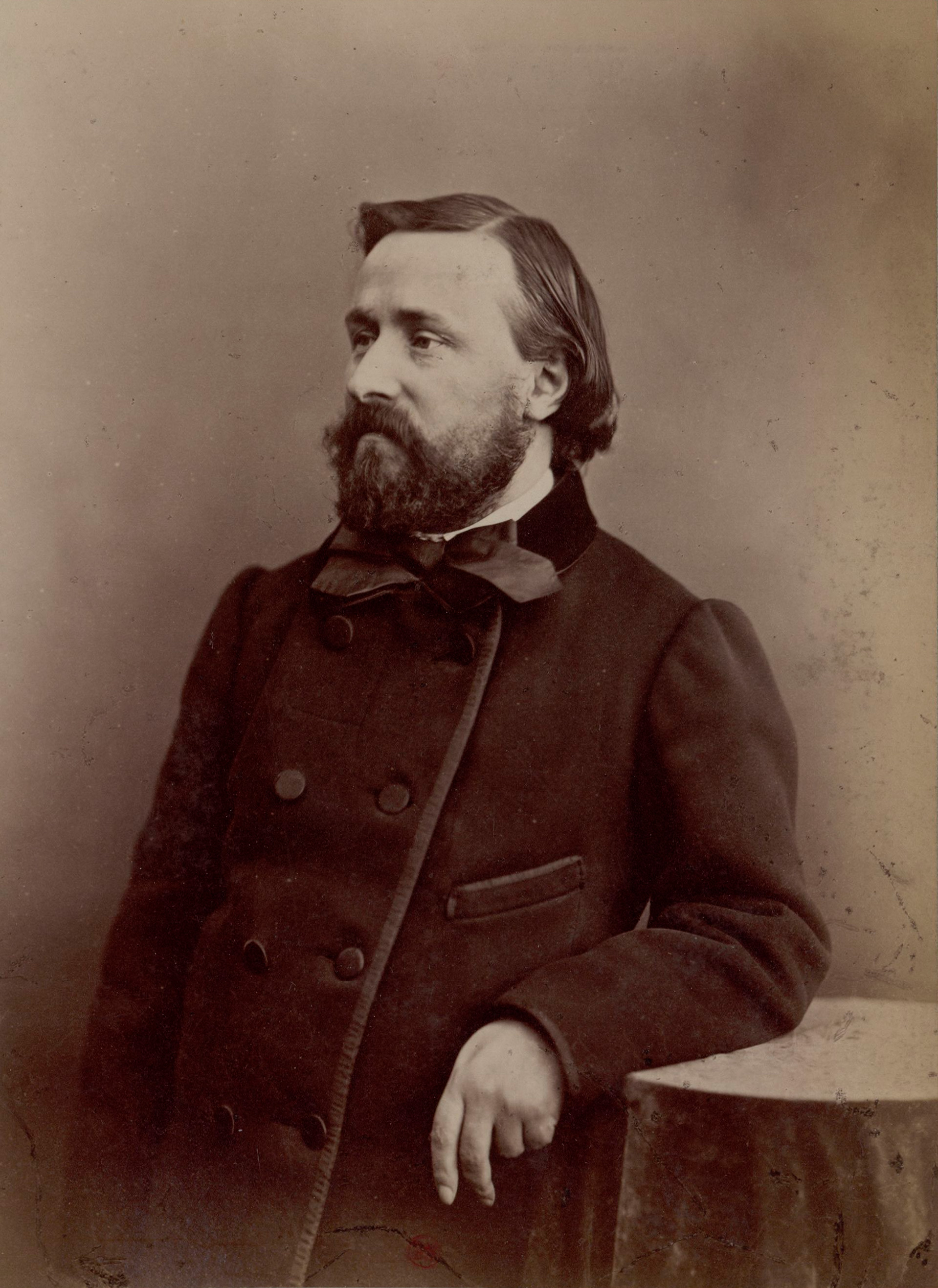
- Photo by Nadar
- Born: 19 November 1819; Paris, France
- Died: 26 January 1904 (aged 84); Paris, France
- Occupations: Author and politician
- Children: Paul Deschanel

Signature
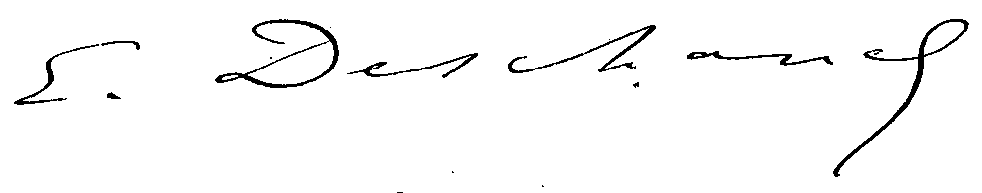

Émile Auguste Étienne Martin Deschanel (French: [emil deʃanɛl]; 19 November 1819 – 26 January 1904) was a French author and politician, the father of Paul Deschanel, the 11th President of the French Republic.

He graduated from École normale supérieure. His works include: Études sur Aristophane (1867), Le Romantisme des classiques (1882), and the earlier, controversial Catholicisme et socialisme (1850) - as a result of which, Napoleon III forced him into exile between 1851 and 1859. He later became a professor at the Collège de France. He was a member of the French Parliament from 1876 until 1881 and, in 1881, became a senator for life.

A street bearing his name is located in the 7th arrondissement of Paris bordering the Champ de Mars.
