= Albert Oustric =

French entrepreneur and banker

- Born: 2 September 1887; Carcassonne, Aude, France
- Died: 16 April 1971 (aged 83); Toulouse, France
- Occupations: Entrepreneur, banker
- Known for: Bank failure scandal

Albert Oustric (2 September 1887 – 16 April 1971) was a French entrepreneur and banker. He was the son of a cafe proprietor, and held various jobs before managing to raise capital for a hydroelectric power generation company. He founded a small bank in 1919 and specialized in turning around enterprises that were in financial difficulty through debt consolidation and the sale of shares at inflated prices. He invested in a wide range of industries from mining to leather goods and retail banking. His group was bankrupted by the economic crisis that started in 1929, and many small depositors were ruined. Oustric was found guilty of fraud and embezzlement and spent several years in prison. A commission of inquiry found that several politicians had protected Oustric, including the Minister of Justice. The Senate tried and acquitted them.

== Early years ==
Albert Oustric was born on 2 September 1887 in Carcassonne, Aude. His father ran a cafe in Carcassonne, then became manager of a wine and spirits store in Toulouse. Albert Oustric became clerk to an advocate, then a sales representative of the Cusenier distilled beverage firm in the Aude.

When his father died in 1910 he succeeded him as manager of the Toulouse shop, and continued as a Cusenier representative. During World War I he was mobilized as an accountant in a shell-making factory. He was released from the factory to exploit a legacy of his father, the rights to a waterfall in the Gripp valley of the Hautes-Pyrénées, by building a hydropower plant.

He raised the funds needed to float the Force & lumière des Pyrénées company for this purpose. He also floated the Electro-Métal company to produce ferro-silicon in Haute-Garonne.

== Banker and businessman ==
=== Early growth ===
In June 1919 Oustric founded Oustric & Cie, a small bank with a capital of one million francs, increased to five million in July 1921 and to fifteen million in 1921 after being transformed into a limited company. In 1921 he married Madeleine de Rigny. The bank had a small amount of capital from the hydroelectric company and the start of a consumer business. It became involved in arbitrage operations with coal and gold mines. Oustric's bank would issue stocks of questionable companies and use false publicity to increase their value before selling them off. Oustric sold shares in an artificial silk company, la Borswich française, in 1923. In 1926 Oustric invested in a silver mine in Bolivia, the Huanchaca. He used announcements of false discoveries to make the share prices rise by ten times their original value, then let them fall, then pushed them up again. With advance knowledge of price movements, he could sell high and buy low, while other investors always lost. He profited from the protectionist isolation of the French stock exchange, cut off from international finance and from other exchanges.

=== Snia Viscosa ===
In 1926 Oustrick became involved in Snia Viscosa, an Italian maker of artificial silk. The company was controlled by the Italian financier Riccardo Gualino, who was assisted by Benito Mussolini and the Bank of Italy, and had become the second-largest rayon manufacturer in the world. On 26 March 1926 Gaston Vidal, a former deputy and secretary of state and now a director of the Oustric bank, asked on behalf of the bank for authorization to list 500,000 shares of Snia Viscosa in France. This was against the current policy of the Ministry of Finance, which did not allow listing of foreign companies in the French stockmarket. However, the responsible official asked the opinion of René Besnard, the French ambassador in Rome. Vidal went to Rome and met the ambassador, who wrote that he had no objection to introducing shares of Snia Viscosa on the French stock exchange.

The Ministry official then submitted the issue to Raoul Péret, Minister of Finance, saying he saw no reason to authorize the requested share float. Péret replied that the ambassador had insisted that the authorization be granted. Péret asked the opinion of the Ministry of Commerce, which was against it. He pressed the ministry, which remained cautious and wanted assurances that there would be an agreement between the French and Italian textile industries. Oustric said he would be willing to help obtain an agreement, and on that basis Péret gave the authorization. After leaving office, Péret became legal counsel to the Oustric bank six months after the Snia Viscose shares were listed.

=== Industrial empire ===
Oustric moved from arbitrage to ownership of various risky enterprises which he turned around through debt consolidation and partial sale of shares. During the 1920s he helped salvage the textile maker Kahn, Lang & Manuel, the spinner Valentin Bloch, the paper maker Papeteries de Gascogne and other enterprises. He became involved in companies ranging from oil production to leather goods. In 1929 his holding company acquired Maréchal, a firm in Lyon that made reinforced fabrics. He then acquired Sarlino (Société rémoise de linoléums) in Reims, and Athos, a sewing machine company. Through a structure of holding companies the bank in 1929 controlled an empire of enterprises with optimistically priced shares. One of these was the Banque Adam, a long-established bank in the Pas-de-Calais. The operation was respectable, supported by other banks, and known for its success in salvaging troubled enterprises.

== Bankruptcy ==
Group structure in October 1930

When Gualino quarreled with Mussolini, the value of the Snia Viscosa shares fell. The general decline of stock prices in 1929 also undermined Oustric's business. He used funds from the Banque Adam to buy shares in his other companies so as to keep their prices from falling. The attorney general became aware of this and asked for an indictment. In October 1930 Raoul Péret, who was now Minister of Justice, delayed the indictment for twelve days while the bank's shares were plunging in value. They were finally de-listed on 31 October 1930. On 2 November the minister told the attorney general and state prosecutor that an inopportune indictment might trigger a serious financial crisis. On 4 November 1930 the attorney general withdrew his request for immediate indictment. The Oustric group failed with debts of 125 million on 5 November 1930. Banque Adam, a Calais-based consumer bank majority owned by Oustric, was among the subsidiaries that failed.

Oustric was arrested and taken to La Santé Prison. The default caused the ruin of many small savers. The Peugeot company lost all its capital, and came close to failing. The news of the default broke at a time when the scandal of Marthe Hanau's failed bank in which many small investors lost their savings was still current. The newspapers claimed that Oustric had drained cash from the Banque Adam taking the money of depositors.

== Political inquiry ==
On 21 November 1930 the Chamber of Deputies appointed a commission of inquiry to determine if there had been any improper political involvement. The commission of inquiry found that Péret had been involved as counsel of the Oustric bank and of the Paris Foncier and Holfra companies that it controlled. He had received large fees but had provided no legal services. The commission found that the minister had been paid for "political services" and that he had abused his power to prevent his client being charged.

One of the leading members of the commission was Georges Mandel. The inquiry showed that the Bank of France had been involved in Oustric's speculations, indicating extreme naivety of the central bank staff. The commission drew criticism for publishing names, and L'Ere Nouvelle said that it was muck-raking.

Péret resigned, as did Henri Falcoz and Eugène Lautier, two undersecretaries of state who had also been paid by Outric. The government of André Tardieu was defeated and resigned in December 1930.

On 25 March 1931, the Chamber of Deputies voted to impeach Péret before the High Court. The Senate sat as High Court on 20 July 1931, with Albert Lebrun as president and Joseph Caillaux among the judges. The Attorney General pressed for severe penalties, but other witnesses said they did not think Péret had acted in favor of Oustric. On 23 July 1931, he was acquitted. The court simply found that the methods he had used should be morally condemned. The final report of the commission was completed in March 1932 but remained unpublished for fear of the effect on public opinion on the eve of a general election.

== Last years ==
In January 1932 Oustric was found guilty of fraud, embezzlement and engaging in financial irregularities. Eventually Oustric spent 38 months in prison and was fined 31,000 francs in damages. He was released on medical grounds and took a job as an employee of his former bank, which had reopened, at 3,000 francs a month. He was rehabilitated on 15 May 1945. Albert Oustric died on 16 April 1971 in Toulouse aged 83.

== Sources ==
- Amson, Daniel (2000). "La Responsabilité politique et pénale des ministres de 1789 à 1958" (PDF). Pourvoirs (in French) (92). Archived from the original (PDF) on 2015-09-24.
- Bonin, Hubert (April–June 1996). "Oustric, un financier prédateur ? (1914-1930)". Revue Historique (in French). 295 (2 (598)). Presses Universitaires de France: 429–448. JSTOR 40955974.
- Cazals, Rémy; Fabre, Daniel; Blanc, Dominique (1990). "OUSTRIC (Albert)". Les Audois: dictionnaire biographique. Association des amis des archives de l'Aude. ISBN 9782906442078.
- Desjardins, Bernard (2003). Le Crédit lyonnais, 1863-1986: études historiques. Librairie Droz. ISBN 978-2-600-00807-5.
- Eichengreen, Barry (2014-12-20). Hall of Mirrors: The Great Depression, the Great Recession, and the Uses-and Misuses-of History. Oxford University Press. ISBN 978-0-19-939200-1.
- Jankowski, Paul (2002). Stavisky: A Confidence Man in the Republic of Virtue. Cornell University Press. ISBN 0-8014-3959-0.
- Jenkins, Brian; Millington, Chris (2015-03-24). France and Fascism: February 1934 and the Dynamics of Political Crisis. Taylor & Francis. ISBN 978-1-317-50724-6.
- "Le Sénat, Haute Cour de Justice sous la IIIe République : l'affaire Péret (1931)". Senate of France.
- Martin, Benjamin F. (2006). France in 1938. LSU Press. ISBN 978-0-8071-3195-4.
- Sherwood, John M. (1970-01-01). Georges Mandel and the Third Republic. Stanford University Press. ISBN 978-0-8047-0731-2.
- Théobald, Gérard (2014-04-29). La Liberté est ou n'est pas... Editions Publibook. ISBN 978-2-342-02233-9.
- Valance, Georges (2007-07-21). "Le temps des scandales Hanau, Oustric et Stavisky". Les Echos (in French).
