= Lucien Graux =

French doctor (1878-1944)

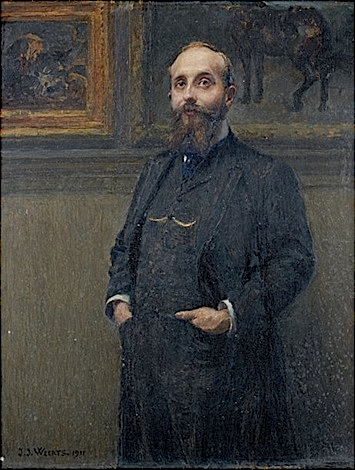
- Born: 4 April 1878
- Died: 10 October 1944 (aged 66)
- Awards: Commander of the Legion of Honour

Lucien Désiré Prosper Graux known as Lucien Graux (1878-1944) was a French doctor, entrepreneur, art collector, bibliophile, writer, publisher and resistance fighter. He launched the Arys perfume house (1916-1950).

== Early life ==
Lucien Désiré Prosper Graux was born on 4 April 1878 in Paris, son of the doctor Gaston Graux (1848-1925), president of the water company of Contrexéville and an art collector. As a medical student he joined the Freemasons on 12 April 1899, and in 1905, he defended his thesis, entitled Application of cryoscopy to the study of mineral waters.

== Scientific career ==
Graux specialized in public hygiene, urology, and pharmacology applied to care. He served as editor of La Gazette Médicale de Paris (1906-1914). In December 1907, he filed a patent for a drug combating uric acid, called Urodonal, which he promoted through the Etablissements Chatelain (Paris), distributor of pharmaceutical products such as Globéol and Jubol.

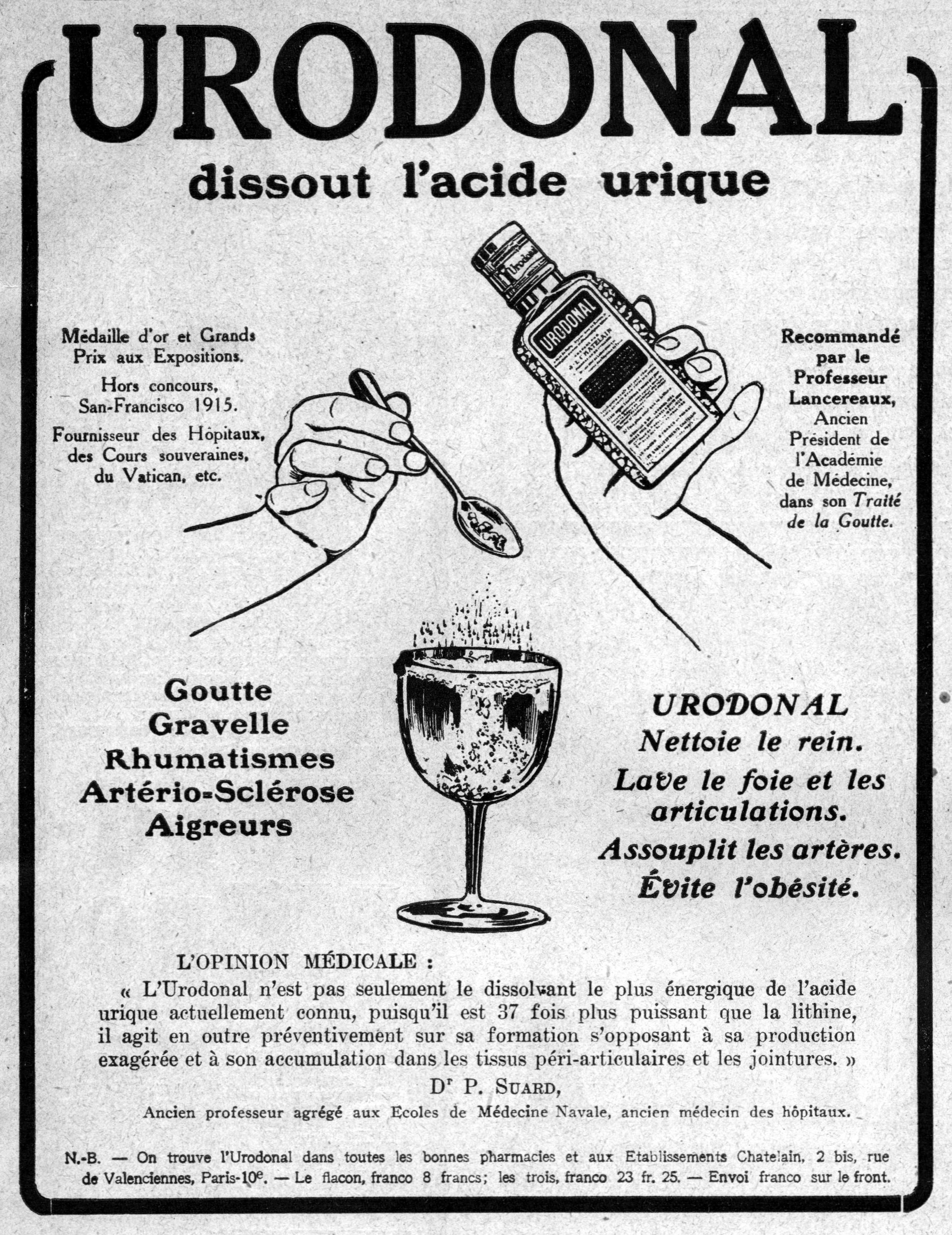
Publicity for l'Urodonal in L'Illustration (February 1918).

In 1915, Graux joined the army, serving in World War I as a medical assistant to the infantry regiment commanded by General de Maud'huy. In 1916, he founded the “Société anonyme des parfums d'Arys” in Paris, and had it listed on the stock market in 1918. For twenty years, it experienced international growth and employed around a hundred people in Courbevoie. It participated in the French perfume pavilion during the 1925 International Exhibition and opened a prestigious boutique at 3 rue de la Paix. During the years 1920 to 1930, Lucien Graux was in charge of diplomatic missions and was adviser to various ministries including that of Foreign Trade. He was named Knight of the Legion of Honor.

== Collector ==
A bibliophile and passionate collector, he assembled in his home at 33 avenue Kleber, one of the largest and finest private collections of manuscripts and books of his time. He offered the State the "Testament of Louis XIV", an invaluable handwritten document that he possessed. He also created a small publishing house called "The Friends of the Doctor" which published numerous booklets, printed in less than a hundred copies, sometimes illustrated with original engravings: Graux thus printed some of his essays devoted to manuscripts and autographs of historical personalities he collected. Graux was the author of more than fifty essays, which he published between 1906 and 1939, as well as a dozen novels of a fantastic nature, tinged with occultism.

== German occupation of France, resistance, death at Dachau ==
In June 1940, he joined the French Resistance, but was arrested at his home by the Gestapo in June 1944. He was deported to the Dachau camp, where he was murdered on 10 October 1944. Arys perfumes then launched Témoignage, a compound juice in homage to Lucien Graux, before disappearing.

Graux' library was dispersed at Drouot by his widow, under the hammer of auctioneer Maurice Rheims, in a series of nine sales from 1953 to 1957. A few important pieces were pre-empted by the National Library that year.

His name appears in the crypt of the Pantheon.

== Selected works ==
=== Occultism et spiritism ===
- La Dame de cristal, Paris, L'Édition française illustrée, 1919; réédition Fayard, 1928.
- Réincarné !, Paris, L'Édition française illustrée, 1920.
- Moryce Biegouny, le médium errant. Hanté !, roman de l'au-delà..., Paris, Georges Crès, 1921.
- Initié !, roman de l'au-delà, Paris, Georges Crès, 1922.
- Saturnin le Saturnien, roman, Paris, Georges Crès, 1924.
- Moïra, roman, Paris, Georges Crès, 1925.
- Le Docteur illuminé, biographie romancée de Raymond Lulle, Paris, Arthème Fayard et Cie, 1927.
- L'Automne d'Adonis, roman, Paris, Arthème Fayard et Cie, 1927.
- Le Fantôme de Kinahan, avec des lithographies d'Amédée de La Patellière, Paris, Ducros et Colas / Pour les Amis du Docteur Lucien-Graux, [1930].
- Sous le signe d'Horus, Paris, Le Rouge et le Noir, 1931.

=== Illustrated stories ===
- Les Fausses nouvelles de la grande guerre, Paris, L'Édition française illustrée, 1918-1920, prix Dodo de l’Académie française en 1920.
- Les Yeux du mort, lettre-préface du général de Maud'huy, illustré par André Galland, Paris, L'Édition française illustrée, 1919.
- La Colombe meurtrie, avec gravures sur bois originales par Paul-Émile Colin, Paris, 1927.
- Le Saint Homme de Huestra, avec des gravures sur bois originales de Hermann-Paul, Paris, Manuel Bruker, 1928.
- Le Maréchal de Beurnonville, biographie avec hors-textes, Paris, Librairie Ancienne Honoré Champion, 1929.

== Bibliography ==
- Henri Colas, La bibliothèque du docteur Lucien Graux (avec 18 reproductions), in Le Bibliophile No. V, 1933, p. 229-245
- J. Bourguignon, Henri Mondor, Jean Porcher (avant-propos d'André Maurois), Hommage au docteur Lucien Graux, six eaux-fortes par Marcel Roche et André Clot, une lithographie par Robert Wehrlin, 210 exemplaires numérotés, Manuel Bruker, Paris, 1947.
- Association des écrivains combattants (collectif), Anthologie des écrivains mort à la guerre 1939-1945, Paris, Albin Michel, 1960, pp. 315–316.
- « Graux, Lucien », In: Jean-Baptiste Baronian (1978), Panorama de la littérature fantastique de langue française, Paris, La Renaissance du livre, 2000; réédition La Table ronde, 2007.
