= Loison =

- Commune
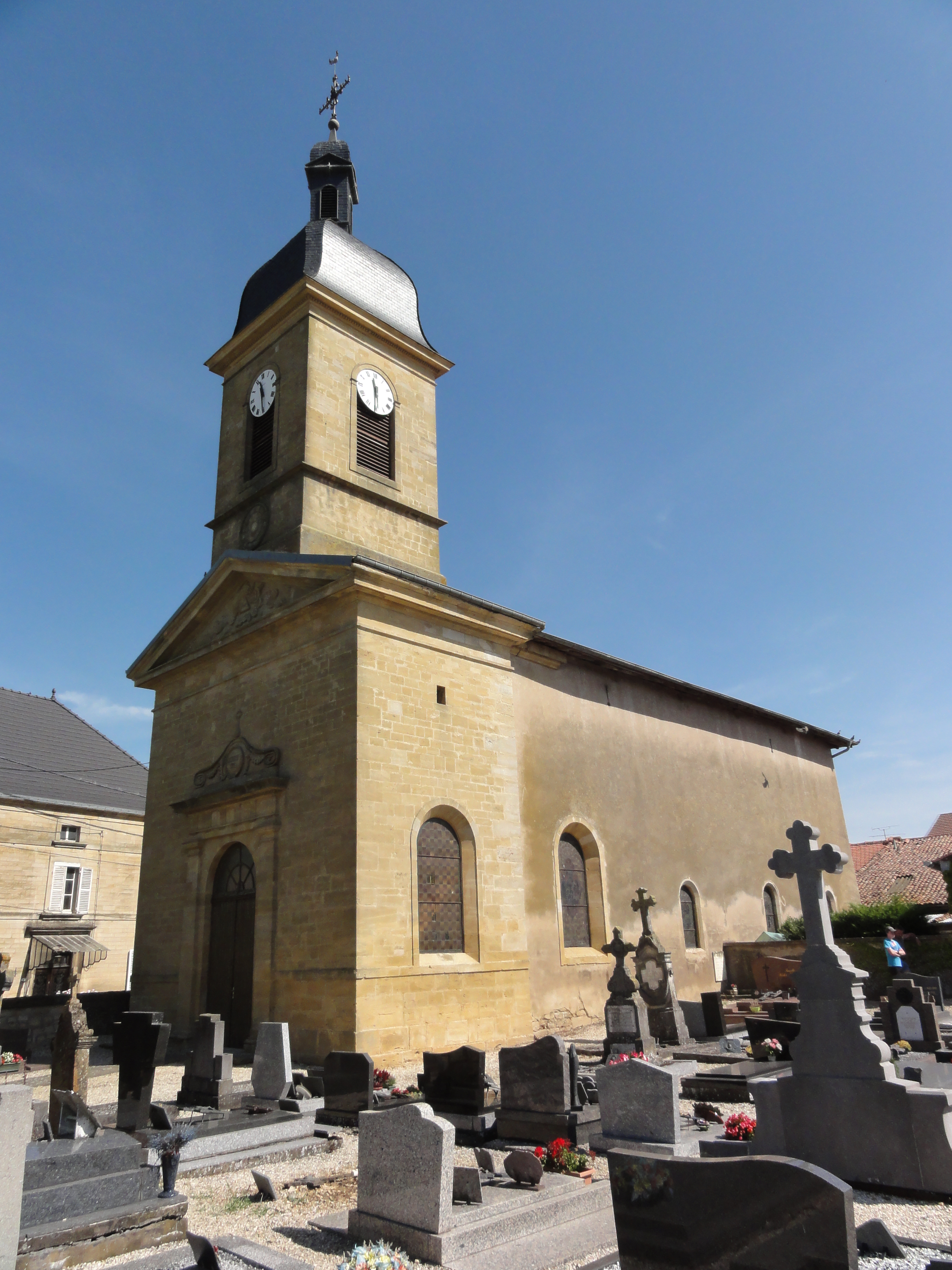
- The church in Loison
- Location of Loison
- Location within France Location within Grand Est
- Coordinates: 49°18′41″N 5°36′49″E
- Country: France
- Region: Grand Est
- Department: Meuse
- Arrondissement: Verdun
- Canton: Bouligny
- Intercommunality: CC Damvillers Spincourt

Government
  - Mayor (2020–2026): Michel Jozan
- Area^{1}: 14.17 km^{2} (5.47 sq mi)
- Elevation: 225 m (738 ft)
- Population (2023): 116
  - Density: 8.19/km^{2} (21.2/sq mi)
- Time zone: UTC+01:00 (CET)
  - Summer (DST): UTC+02:00 (CEST)
- INSEE/Postal code: 55299 /55230
- ^{1} French Land Register data, which excludes lakes, ponds, glaciers > 1 km^{2} (0.386 sq mi or 247 acres) and river estuaries.

Loison (French pronunciation: [lwazɔ̃]) is a commune in the Meuse department in Grand Est in north-eastern France.

== See also ==
- Communes of the Meuse department
