= Le Journal =

French newspaper

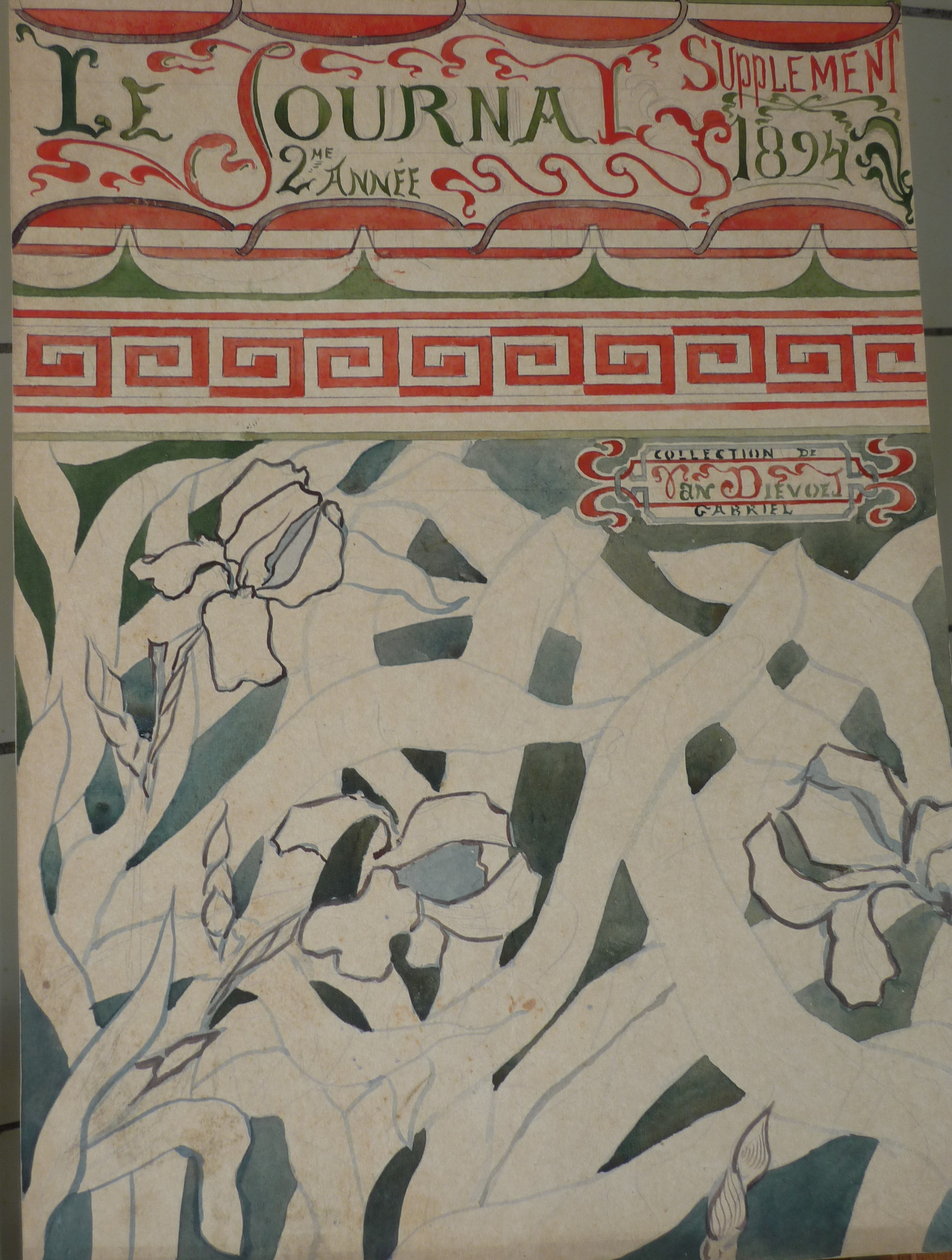
Supplement to the newspaper, 1894, image by Gabriel Van Dievoet

Le Journal (The Journal) was a Paris daily newspaper published from 1892 to 1944 in a small, four-page format.

== Background ==
It was founded and edited by Fernand Arthur Pierre Xau until 1899. It was bought and managed by the family of Henri Letellier in 1899 and became "the most Parisian, the most literary, and the most boulevardier of the newspapers of Paris" (Simon Arbellot, see Curnonsky).

During World War I, Le Journal was at the center of an intrigue involving Paul Bolo, the essence of which was that the German government was alleged to be attempting to gain influence in France and promote pacifist propaganda by buying French newspapers.

It is understood that during part of its existence it was located at 100 Rue Richelieu Paris. Source – Contemporary Medallion ( undated ).

During the Spanish Civil War, the newspaper supported the Nationalist side, including printing articles denying Nationalist responsibility for the Bombing of Guernica. At the time the newspaper was the second largest morning newspaper in Paris, with a circulation of 400,000.

After the fall of Paris on 14 June 1940, it fell back to Limoges, then Marseille, then Limoges again, and finally Lyon.

It had various supplements: Le Journal pour tous, 1891–1906; La Mode du Journal, 1896–1898; La Vraie mode, 1898–1913; Le Journal (Édition du littoral), 1907–1911.
