= Paul Deschanel =

President of France in 1920

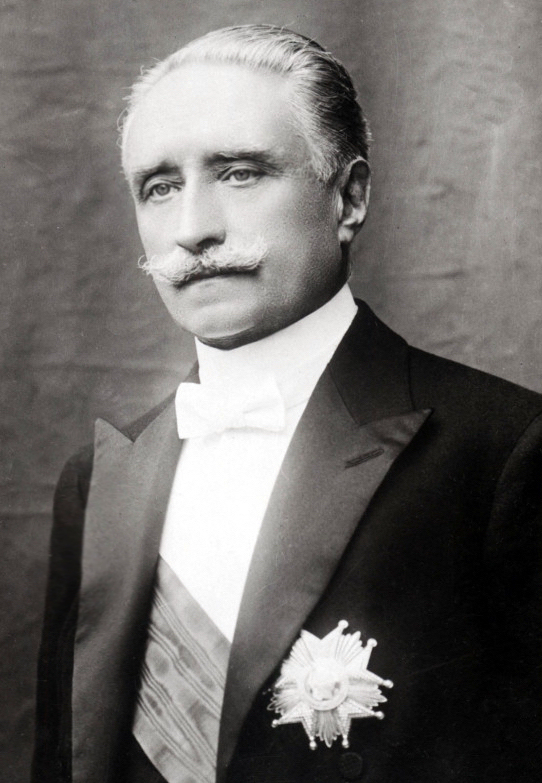
- Deschanel in 1920

President of France
- In office 18 February 1920 – 21 September 1920
- Prime Minister: Alexandre Millerand
- Preceded by: Raymond Poincaré
- Succeeded by: Alexandre Millerand

Member of the Senate
- In office 10 January 1921 – 28 April 1922
- Constituency: Eure-et-Loir

President of the Chamber of Deputies
- In office 23 May 1912 – 10 February 1920
- Preceded by: Henri Brisson
- Succeeded by: Raoul Péret
- In office 9 June 1898 – 31 May 1902
- Preceded by: Henri Brisson
- Succeeded by: Léon Bourgeois

Member of the Chamber of Deputies
- In office 10 November 1885 – 18 February 1920
- Constituency: Eure-et-Loir

Personal details
- Born: 13 February 1855 Schaerbeek, Belgium
- Died: 28 April 1922 (aged 67) Paris, France
- Party: Democratic Republican Alliance
- Education: University of Paris

Paul Eugène Louis Deschanel (French: [pɔl deʃanɛl]; 13 February 1855 – 28 April 1922) was a French politician who served as President of France from 18 February to 21 September 1920. Seven months into his presidency, he was ousted due to mental illness and was succeeded by his prime minister, Alexandre Millerand.

== Early life and career ==
Paul Deschanel, the son of Émile Deschanel (1819–1904), professor at the Collège de France and senator, was born in Brussels, where his father was living in exile (1851–1859), owing to his opposition to Napoleon III. He is one of only two French Presidents (the other is Valéry Giscard d'Estaing) who were born outside France (Deschanel in Belgium; Giscard in Koblenz, Germany).

=== Education ===
Paul Deschanel was schooled at the Collège Sainte-Barbe-des-Champs in Fontenay-aux-Roses, then at the Lycée Louis-le-Grand and the Lycée Condorcet in Paris. The family left Paris for several months in 1870–1871, due to the Siege of Paris. Deschanel completed his military service in the infantry in Paris in 1873, then studied at the École Libre des Sciences Politiques and the Faculty of Law of Paris, graduating with a baccalaureate in law in 1874 and a licentiate in law in 1875.

=== Early career in politics ===
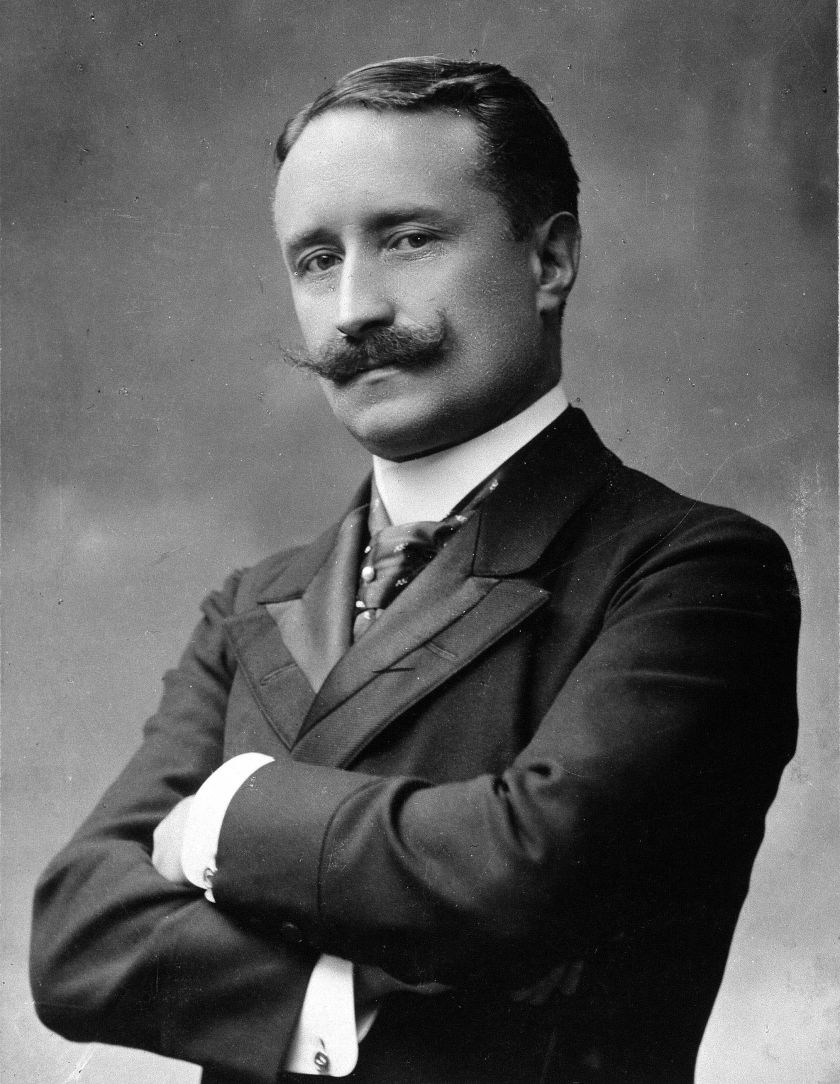
Paul Deschanel, c. 1900

He began his career as secretary to Deshayes de Marcère (1876) and then to Jules Simon (1876–1877). In October 1885, he was elected deputy for Eure-et-Loir. From the first, he was an important figure in the Chamber of Deputies, being one of the most notable orators of the Progressist Republican group. In January 1896, he was elected vice-president of the Chamber, and henceforth devoted himself to the struggle against the Left, not only in parliament, but also in public meetings throughout France.

His addresses at Marseille on 26 October 1896, at Carmaux on 27 December 1896, and at Roubaix on 10 April 1897 served as a formal declaration of the Progressist party‘s political and social aims.

In June 1898, he was elected president of the Chamber, and was re-elected in 1901, but rejected in 1902. Nevertheless, he came forward brilliantly in 1904 and 1905 as a supporter of the law on the separation of church and state. He also gained a position on the Committee of Foreign Affairs, and was president of the committee when the Franco-German treaty of 1911 came before Parliament.

== World War One ==
He was re-elected deputy in 1910, and on 23 May 1912 was chosen to be the president of the Chamber. In this role he played a great part during World War I as the national orator; he delivered orations more frequently than he made speeches. He served until he was elected President of France on 17 January 1920 by an overwhelming majority, having beaten Georges Clemenceau in the preliminary party ballot.

== Presidency and decline ==
Deschanel sought to exercise more for presidential authority than had been de rigueur during the Third Republic; while he was active during his first six months in office, he was later unable to implement his policies due to a decline in his mental health.

As president, his eccentric behaviour caused some consternation; on one occasion, after a delegation of schoolgirls had presented him with a bouquet, he tossed the flowers back at them. On another occasion a few days later, he gave an interview to the British ambassador wearing nothing but his decorations. It all culminated when, late on the night of 24 May 1920, he fell out of a large window of the presidential train near Montargis after taking some sleeping pills and was found wandering in his nightshirt by a platelayer, who took him to the nearest level-crossing keeper's cottage. His resignation was offered on 21 September 1920, and he was placed in a sanatorium at Rueil-Malmaison for three months. After his release he was elected to the senate in January 1921, serving until his death from pneumonia one year later.

Until the death penalty was abolished in 1981, he was the only French head of state during whose term in office no persons in France were executed. Deschanel himself was a longtime opponent of the death penalty.

== Works ==
Paul Deschanel was elected a member of the Académie française in 1899, his books being:

- La Question du Tonkin, Berger-Levrault (1883)
- La Politique française en Océanie : à propos du canal de Panama, Berger-Levrault (1884)
- Les Intérêts français dans l’océan Pacifique, Berger-Levrault (1888)
- Orateurs et Hommes d'État : Frédéric II et M. de Bismarck, Fox et Pitt, Lord Grey, Talleyrand, Berryer, M. Gladstone, Calmann-Lévy (1888)
- Figures littéraires : Renan, Paul Bourget, Sainte-Beuve, Edgar Quinet, Paul Dubois, Mignet, Diderot, Rabelais, Calmann-Lévy (1888)
- Figures de femmes : Madame du Deffand, Madame d'Épinay, Madame Necker, Madame de Beaumont, Madame Récamier, etc., Calmann-Lévy (1889)
- Questions actuelles : discours prononcés à la Chambre des députés, Hetzel (1890)
- La Décentralisation, Berger-Levrault (1895)
- La Question sociale, Calmann-Lévy (1898)
- La République nouvelle, Calmann-Lévy (1898)
- Quatre ans de présidence (1898–1902), Calmann-Lévy (1902)
- Politique intérieure et étrangère : la séparation, les retraites, la délation, l'anti-patriotisme, l'entente franco-anglaise, les affaires du Maroc, Calmann-Lévy (1906)
- À l’Institut, Calmann-Lévy (1907)
- L'Organisation de la démocratie, Fasquelle (1910)
- Hors des frontières, Fasquelle (1910)
- Paroles françaises, Fasquelle (1911)
- Les Commandements de la patrie, Bloud & Gay (1917)
- La France victorieuse : paroles de guerre, Fasquelle (1919)
- Gambetta, Hachette (1919)

Political offices
Preceded by Henri Brisson	President of the Chamber of Deputies; 1898–1902	Succeeded by Léon Bourgeois
Preceded by Henri Brisson	President of the Chamber of Deputies; 1912–1920	Succeeded by Raoul Péret
Preceded by Raymond Poincaré	President of France; 1920	Succeeded by Alexandre Millerand
Regnal titles
Preceded by Raymond Poincaré	Co-Prince of Andorra; 1920; Served alongside: Justí Guitart i Vilardebó	Succeeded by Alexandre Millerand
