= Raoul Péret =

French lawyer and politician

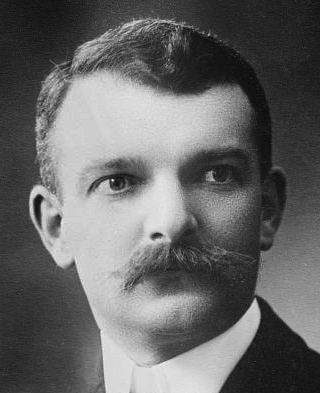
Péret in 1915

Raoul Adolphe Péret (French pronunciation: [ʁaul adɔlf peʁɛ]; 29 November 1870 – 22 July 1942) was a French lawyer and politician.

== Biography ==
Raoul Péret was born in Châtellerault (Vienne), son of a magistrate. He followed his father into the law, becoming an advocate at the Court of Cassation in Paris. In 1893 he served as an aide to Justice Minister Eugène Guérin. He became a Doctor of Laws in 1895 and served as procurator of Auxerre.

He was involved in local politics from 1896, and in 1902 he was elected to the Chamber of Deputies, representing Vienne. He became a leading member of the Chamber's Justice committee, and was reelected in 1907 and 1910. He first served in government in Gaston Doumergue's first administration (1913–1914) as secretary of state to Interior Minister René Renoult. In the reshuffle following the resignation of Joseph Caillaux, Péret became Minister of Commerce, Industry, Posts and Telegraphs from 17 March 1914 to 9 June 1914.

On the outbreak of the First World War, Péret was recalled to the French army. He served in administrative posts, but remained active in the Chamber of Deputies. In 1917 he served as Justice Minister in Paul Painlevé's short-lived first government. On its fall, he returned to the Chamber where he took over the presidency of the important budget committee.

In 1920 he replaced Paul Deschanel as President of the Chamber of Deputies when the latter resigned due to ill-health. In 1921 he was asked to form a government by President Alexandre Millerand to replace that of Georges Leygues, but his negotiations were unsuccessful and Aristide Briand formed the new government. In 1924 he was replaced as President of the Chamber by Painlevé.

Péret returned to ministerial office in 1926, as Minister of Finance in Briand's eighth government. He wished to undertake major financial reforms to meet the growing economic crisis in France, but was unable to find support from his colleagues. His resignation provoked the collapse of Briand's government.

In 1927 Péret was elected to the French Senate. In 1930 he returned to government once more as Minister of Justice on André Tardieu's second government. A financial scandal in late 1930 concerning his actions as Minister of Finance in 1926 under Briand, and his connections with the entrepreneur Albert Oustric, led to his resignation, and that of Tardieu's government. Péret was charged, but acquitted in 1931. Although he continued to serve in the Senate for some years afterwards, the scandal effectively ended his political career.

He died at Saint-Mandé in 1942.
