= Charles Reibel =

French lawyer and politician

Minister of the Liberated Regions
- In office 15 January 1922 – 29 March 1924
- Prime Minister: Raymond Poincaré
- Preceded by: Louis Loucheur
- Succeeded by: Louis Marin (politician)

Personal details
- Born: 29 December 1882 Vesoul, Haute-Saône, France
- Died: 26 June 1966 (aged 83) Paris, France
- Occupation: Lawyer

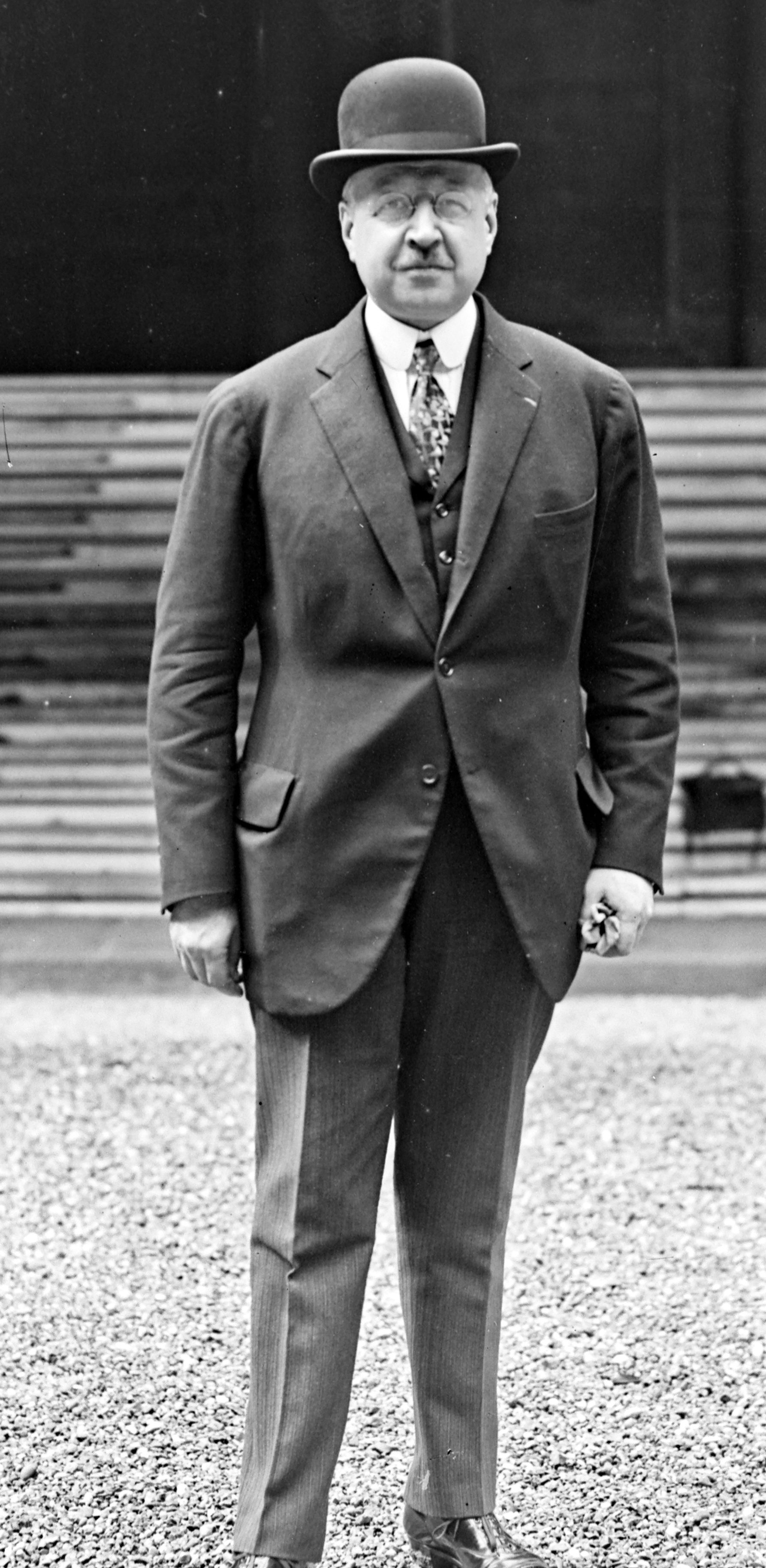
Charles Reibel in 1924

Charles Reibel (29 December 1882 – 26 June 1966) was a French lawyer and politician who was a deputy from 1919 to 1935 and senator from 1936 to 1944. He was Minister of the Liberated Regions from 1922 to 1924, responsible for efforts to restore the area of northern France that had been devastated by the trench warfare of World War I (1914–18). He was against appeasement of Germany before the start of World War II (1939–45) and in favor of stronger defenses and greater armament. However, after the collapse of resistance when Germany invaded France in 1940 he became convinced of the necessity for an armistice to prevent France from again being devastated, and supported the formation of the Vichy government under Marshal Philippe Pétain.

== Early years ==
Charles Reibel was born on 29 December 1882 in Vesoul, Haute-Saône. His father was an intern in the Strasbourg hospital, grandson of a notary in Rhinau, Bas-Rhin. His mother's family was from Lorraine. He attended the lycée in Nancy for his secondary education, then studied at the faculty of law in Nancy, gaining a doctorate in law. He entered the Paris bar as secretary of the conference. He was an attaché to Raymond Poincaré until Poincaré was elected President of France. He ran unsuccessfully for election to the legislature in 1914.

During World War I (1914–18) Reibel was not required to serve but volunteered. He was awarded the Croix de Guerre, the cross of knight of the Legion of Honour and the rank of sous-intendant of the 41st Infantry Division. On 10 July 1915 he was attached to the office of Joseph Thierry, Under Secretary of State for War.

== National politics ==
On 16 November 1919 Reibel was elected deputy for Seine-et-Oise on the list of the National Democratic Union. On 20 January 1920 he was appointed Under-Secretary of State to the President of the Council, holding office in the cabinets of Alexandre Millerand and Georges Leygues until 16 January 1921. Reibel was reported to be in favor of a proposal by the Musée social supporting "the principle of complete equality [of men and women] for all functions, in ministries and central administrations and all departmental and communal administrations, at all levels of the hierarchy."

Reibel was appointed Minister of the Liberated Regions in the Poincaré cabinet from 15 January 1922 to 29 March 1924. He succeeded Louis Loucheur and inherited a mass of outstanding claims and administrative problems that Loucheur had been unable to resolve. The former war zone covered one fourteenth part of France's territory, but before the war had accounted for one fifth of tax revenues. Senator Paul Doumer described it six months after the Armistice as, "a desert, a zone of death, assassination and devastation ... There are corpses of horses, corpses of trees covering the corpses of men." The geographer Albert Demangeon called it "a zone of death, 500 km long and 10–25 km broad, following the battle front in which good land has been transformed into a desert, a wild steppe, where the very fields have erupted ... farm buildings need to be restored, agricultural equipment renewed and the fertility of the soil made anew wherever the 'cyclone' has passed."

By the time Reibel took office the emergency phase was over, but he confirmed that he was committed to "restoring normal life in the towns and villages that fell victim to the invasion." He stated, however, that he would "count firmly upon private initiative", and would restrain direct employment by the state. He said the government would encourage "in every way in its power the individual and collective efforts of the brave people of northern France, notably in the form of reconstruction cooperatives." In the spring of 1922 Reibel toured the "desert-like region" around Soupir to inspect efforts to restore land of the former "red zone" to cultivation, and based on what he saw pledged to support measures to continue to shrink the red zone and return its land to cultivation. At the beginning of 1924 Reibel stated that 55,000 hectares (140,000 acres) of farmland had been so badly disturbed that it would be many years before it could be brought back under cultivation. He said the state would expropriate this land, compensate the owners, and where possible plant it with trees. He said cultivation would probably be "forbidden for tens of years and perhaps even for centuries."

Poincaré toyed with the idea of encouraging Rhineland independence during his ministry, but abandoned the idea. Millerand wanted a bilateral treaty between France and Germany that would cover the Ruhr coal, Lorraine iron ore and security for France on the Rhine. Marshal Foch agreed, and told Reibel, "This is a decisive day. It depends on M. Poincaré whether war becomes impossible between France and Germany. Mark my words. The whole of France's victory is in M. Poincaré's hands. If we do not talk with Germany immediately it is an irretrievably lost opportunity." However, Poincaré refused, thinking that France was still in a strong position, and saying the English would object to discussions with Germany.

Reibel was reelected on 11 May 1924, 29 April 1928 and 8 May 1932, but was not asked to join any of the governments in this period. He developed some resentment against Poincaré for this reason. In 1935 French intelligence considered that the Germans would have offensive capabilities by the next year. During a debate in the chamber Reibel said it would by "wise policy" to advance "the necessary sums to Belgium" so she could complete her defenses. He said that in their present incomplete state the Belgian fortifications were "really non-fortifications" and called on the Minister of War, Louis Maurin, to support financial aid to Belgium. Maurin declined to answer. Reibel ran for election to the Senate in 1935, and was elected in the second round on 23 October 1935 on the National Union list. After the Munich Agreement was signed in September 1938 Pierre-Étienne Flandin sent a telegram of congratulations to Adolf Hitler. Within an hour Paul Reynaud resigned from the Alliance Démocratique. Reibel resigned from the vice-presidency of the party, and violently attacked Flandin at the party congress.

== World War II ==
During World War II (1939–45) Reibel was appointed to the Senate army commission. During the Riom Trial Reibel stated that Jacomet, secretary-general of the defense ministry, had prevented the Senate army commission from sending a mission to the front until December 1939. The army commanders at the time were complaining about parliamentary commissioners disrupting the work of the commands and staffs. In February 1940 the deputy Fernand Robbe claimed in a secret session that France had only 800 modern planes with which to oppose 5,000 German planes. He blamed the situation on red tape, bureaucracy and lack of foresight by the government. That month Reibel wrote to Édouard Daladier to express his "anguish" about the state of munitions production.

By June 1940 Reibel was among a group that had become convinced that an armistice was essential, others being Jean Montigny, Michel Brille, Adrien Marquet and Georges Scapini. He said, "I was waiting [in Bordeaux] for government ministers when they came out of sessions and I tried to convince them one by one of the necessity of the armistice. With French resistance collapsing, General Charles de Gaulle went to London on 15 June 1940 to discuss transport for the French government to North Africa or Britain. On 16 June 1940 Winston Churchill agreed to support a declaration of union between France and Britain.

Paul Reynaud's council did not accept the proposal. Reibel said that if France continued in the war because of this meaningless union with Britain, which would soon be invaded, the whole of France would be laid waste by the Germans. On 10 July 1940 Reibel voted in favor of granting Marshal Philippe Pétain full powers. In his 1940 apology Pourquoi et comment fut décidée la demande d'armistice (Why and how it was decided to ask for an armistice) Reibel said that General Weygand did not think the Anglo-Americans would be superior to the Germans in air power for several years, especially given that the Germans would be able to draw on French production. He wrote,

It was always civilian governments that, faced with the impossibility of continuing a war, imposed a cessation of hostilities on the generals; this time, it was the military leaders who recognized the impossibility of continuing the fight and who, in vain, urged the government to appeal for an armistice. And what military leaders? The victors of the other war: Marshal Pétain, General Weygand, the lieutenant and intimate colleague of Foch.

In March 1942 Pétain secretly submitted a ministerial list to the German security officials in Paris. Reibel was to be Minister of the Interior. After negotiations in which the Americans were involved the government of Pierre Laval was formed on 26 April 1942, but without Reibel. Pétain remained head of state, but was no longer prime minister.

== Last years ==
After the Liberation of France the jury of honor confirmed Reibel's ineligibility for public office due to his vote on 10 July 1940. He died in Paris on 26 June 1966 at the age of 83.

== Publications ==
- Reibel, Charles (1905), Université de Nancy. Faculté de droit. Du Nom commercial, artistique et littéraire en droit français (thesis, Université de Nancy. Faculté de droit) (in French), Paris: Librairie générale de droit et de jurisprudence, p. 308
- Reibel, Charles (1924), La Reconstitution des régions libérées (in French), Paris: impr. M. Cornu, p. 16
- Reibel, Charles (1932), preface, De Bismarck à Stresemann. Comment l'Allemagne fait l'opinion publique, by Florent-Matter, Jean de Granvilliers (ed.), Temps présent (in French), Paris: J. Téqui; éditions Jules Tallandier, p. 222
- Reibel, Charles (1934), preface, Problèmes d'hier et d'aujourd'hui, by Antoine Scheikevitch (in French), Paris: Alliance démocratique, p. 255
- Foch, Ferdinand; Lyautey, Hubert; Reibel, Charles (1938), Pourquoi nous avons été à deux doigts de la guerre (in French), Paris: A. Fayard, p. 63
- Reibel, Charles (1940), Pourquoi et comment fut décidée la demande d'armistice (in French), Vanves: Impr. Kapp, p. 32
- Reibel, Charles (1941), Les Responsables, ma déposition devant la Cour suprême de justice... [10° édition.] (in French), Paris: Éditions Baudinière, p. 64
- Reibel, Charles (1946), La Vérité sur les origines du débarquement allié en Afrique du nord (in French), p. 22

== Sources ==
- Alexander, Martin S. (2003-11-13), The Republic in Danger: General Maurice Gamelin and the Politics of French Defence, 1933–1940, Cambridge University Press, ISBN 978-0-521-52429-2
- Baratta, Joseph Preston (2004), The Politics of World Federation: United Nations, UN reform, atomic control, Greenwood Publishing Group, ISBN 978-0-275-98067-2
- Boyce, Robert (2005-06-20), French Foreign and Defence Policy, 1918–1940: The Decline and Fall of a Great Power, Routledge, ISBN 978-1-134-74827-3
- Carls, Stephen Douglas (2000), Louis Loucheur, 1872–1931: ingénieur, homme d'état, modernisateur de la France, Presses Univ. Septentrion, ISBN 978-2-85939-607-7
- Clark, Linda L. (2000-12-21), The Rise of Professional Women in France: Gender and Public Administration since 1830, Cambridge University Press, ISBN 978-1-139-42686-2
- Clout, Hugh D. (1996-01-01), After the Ruins: Restoring the Countryside of Northern France After the Great War, University of Exeter Press, ISBN 978-0-85989-491-3
- Collectif (2005). "Reibel (Charles)". Dictionnaire des parlementaires français de 1940 à 1958 (in French). Paris: La Documentation française.
- Duroselle, Jean-Baptiste (2013-10-18), France and the Nazi Threat: The Collapse of French Diplomacy 1932–1939, Enigma Books, ISBN 978-1-936274-81-9
- Gates, Eleanor M. (1981-01-01), End of the Affair: The Collapse of the Anglo-French Alliance, 1939–40, University of California Press, ISBN 978-0-520-04292-6
- Imlay, Talbot C. (2003), Facing the Second World War: Strategy, Politics, and Economics in Britain and France, 1938–1940, Oxford University Press, ISBN 978-0-19-926122-2
- Jolly, Jean (1960–1977). "Riebel (Charles)". Dictionnaire des parlementaires français; notices biographiques sur les ministres, députés et sénateurs français de 1889 à 1940 (in French). Paris: Presses universitaires de France. ISBN 2-1100-1998-0.
- Paxton, Robert O. (2015-02-18), Vichy France, Knopf Doubleday Publishing Group, ISBN 978-0-8041-5410-9
- Wieviorka, Olivier (2009), Orphans of the Republic: The Nation's Legislators in Vichy France, Harvard University Press, ISBN 978-0-674-03261-3
