= Minister of the Liberated Regions (France) =

The Minister of Liberated Regions (French: Ministre des Régions libérées) was a cabinet position in France after World War I (1914–18) responsible for the reintegration of the regions of Alsace and Lorraine that had been incorporated in Germany after the Franco-Prussian War of 1870.

== History ==
On 17 November 1917, Georges Clemenceau created the Ministry of Blockade, which was also responsible for the liberated regions. The first minister was Charler-Célestin Jonnart, replaced on 23 November 1917 by Albert François Lebrun. Lebrun took responsibility for the liberated regions, while M. Delavaud took responsibility for the blockade. Émile Ogier, a career civil servant, was minister from January 1920 until Louis Loucheur took over. Louis Marin (politician) was Minister from 29 March 1924 to 14 June 1924 in the third cabinet of Raymond Poincaré and the ephemeral cabinet of Frédéric François-Marsal.

== Ministers ==
From	To	Cabinet	Officeholder
16 November 1917	23 November 1917	Georges Clemenceau (2)	Charles Jonnart (Liberated Regions and Blockade)
23 November 1917	6 November 1919	Georges Clemenceau (2)	Albert François Lebrun
6 November 1919	20 January 1920	Georges Clemenceau (2)	André Tardieu
20 January 1920	24 September 1920	Alexandre Millerand	Émile Ogier
24 September 1920	16 January 1921	Georges Leygues	Émile Ogier
16 January 1921	15 January 1922	Aristide Briand (7)	Louis Loucheur
15 January 1922	29 March 1924	Raymond Poincaré (2)	Charles Reibel
29 March 1924	9 June 1924	Raymond Poincaré (3)	Louis Marin
8 June 1924	15 June 1924	Frédéric François-Marsal	Louis Marin
14 June 1924	17 April 1925	Édouard Herriot (1)	Victor Dalbiez

== Sources ==
- Carls, Stephen Douglas (2000), Louis Loucheur, 1872-1931: ingénieur, homme d'état, modernisateur de la France, Presses Univ. Septentrion, ISBN 978-2-85939-607-7
- Farrar, M.M. (2012-12-06), Conflict and Compromise: The Strategy, Politics and Diplomacy of the French Blockade, 1914–1918, Springer Science & Business Media, ISBN 978-94-010-1992-7
- Jolly, Jean (1960–1977). "Marin (Louis)". Dictionnaire des parlementaires français; notices biographiques sur les ministres, députés et sénateurs français de 1889 à 1940 (in French). Paris: Presses universitaires de France. ISBN 2-1100-1998-0.
