= André Tardieu =

Prime Minister of France (1876-1945)

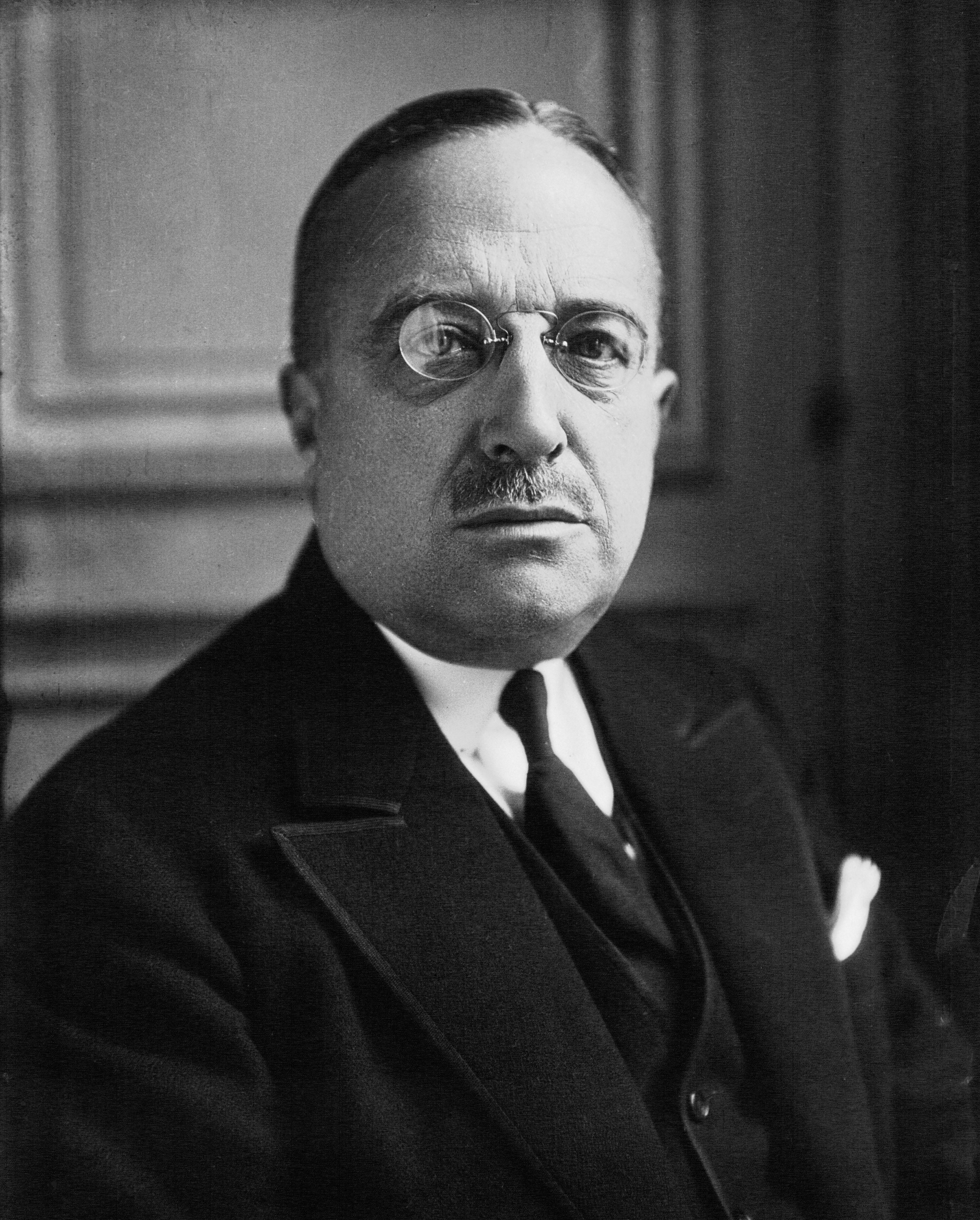
- Tardieu in 1928

Prime Minister of France
- In office 20 February 1932 – 3 June 1932
- President: Joseph Doumer; Albert LeBrun
- Preceded by: Pierre Laval
- Succeeded by: Édouard Herriot
- In office 2 March 1930 – 13 December 1930
- President: Gaston Doumergue
- Preceded by: Camille Chautemps
- Succeeded by: Théodore Steeg
- In office 2 November 1929 – 21 February 1930
- President: Gaston Doumergue
- Preceded by: Aristide Briand
- Succeeded by: Camille Chautemps

Acting President of France
- In office 7 May 1932 – 10 May 1932
- Prime Minister: Himself
- Preceded by: Joseph Doumer
- Succeeded by: Albert LeBrun

Personal details
- Born: André Pierre Gabriel Amédée Tardieu; 22 September 1876 Paris, France
- Died: 15 September 1945 (aged 68) Menton, France
- Party: Democratic Alliance (1914–1932); Republican Centre (1932–1936)

André Pierre Gabriel Amédée Tardieu (French: [ɑ̃dʁe taʁdjø]; 22 September 1876 – 15 September 1945) was three times Prime Minister of France (3 November 1929 – 17 February 1930; 2 March – 4 December 1930; 20 February – 10 May 1932) and a dominant figure of French political life in 1929–1932. He was a moderate conservative with a strong intellectual reputation, but became a weak prime minister at the start of the worldwide Great Depression.

== Biography ==
Tardieu's paternal grandmother was the composer and pianist Charlotte Tardieu. Andre Tardieu was a graduate of the elite Lycée Condorcet. He was accepted by the even more prestigious École Normale Supérieure, but instead entered the diplomatic service. Later, he left the service and became famous as foreign affairs editor of the newspaper Le Temps. He founded the conservative newspaper L'Echo National in association with Georges Mandel.

In 1914, Tardieu was elected to the Chamber of Deputies from the département of Seine-et-Oise, as a candidate of the center-right Democratic Republican Alliance (Alliance Démocratique – AD). He retained this seat till 1924. From 1926 to 1936, he represented the département of Territoire de Belfort.

When World War I broke out, Tardieu enlisted in the army and served before he was wounded and invalided home in 1916. He then returned to politics. He served as Georges Clemenceau's lieutenant in 1919 during the Paris Peace Conference and as Commissioner for Franco-American War Cooperation. On 8 November 1919, he became Minister of Liberated Regions, administering Alsace and Lorraine, and served until Clemenceau's defeat in 1920.

In 1926, Tardieu returned to government as Minister of Transportation under Raymond Poincaré. In 1928, he moved to Minister of the Interior, continuing under Poincaré's successor Aristide Briand.

In November 1929, Tardieu himself succeeded Briand as Président du Conseil (Prime Minister) and remained Interior Minister. Though generally considered a conservative, he introduced a program of welfare measures, including public works, social insurance, and free secondary schooling, and he encouraged modern techniques in industry. On 11 March 1932, legislation was passed that established universal family allowances for all wage earners in business and industry with at least two children.

He hoped to replace the old ideological standoff between the right and left to a more relevant division based on the modern economy. He argued that "a more dynamic capitalism would dry up the Marxism of the working classes." The goal of his leadership was prosperity. When the Great Depression began in 1929, his goal was to evade a depression in France, which worked for several years. According to Monique Clague, "An obstinate deflationist throughout the thirties Tardieu would clearly not have given France a new deal." In the election of 1932 "he acknowledged the responsibility of the modern state for curing unemployment, but, devoted to the Poincaré franc, he would have sacrificed employment to the maintenance of the gold standard."

Tardieu was displaced from both offices for ten days in February–March 1930 by Radical Camille Chautemps, but he returned until December. He was then Minister of Agriculture in 1931, Minister of War in 1932, and again Prime Minister (this time, also Minister of Foreign Affairs), from 20 February to 3 June 1932, until his coalition was defeated in the May elections.

As Prime Minister, Tardieu served for three (7–10 May 1932) days as the Acting President of the French Republic, between the assassination of Paul Doumer and the election of Albert Lebrun.

He was briefly a Minister of State without portfolio in 1934.

His later political activity was largely concerned with containing and responding to German expansion.

In his two-volume book La Révolution à refaire, Tardieu criticized the French parliamentary system.

== Bibliography ==
Some of his books include:

- La France et les alliances (1908)
- La Paix (1921; published in English as The Truth About the Treaty)
- Devant l'obstacle (1927); published in English as France and America)
- La Révolution à refaire, 2 volumes (1936–37)

== Tardieu's First Ministry, 3 November 1929 – 21 February 1930 ==
- André Tardieu – President of the Council and Minister of Interior
- Aristide Briand – Minister of Foreign Affairs
- André Maginot – Minister of War
- Henri Chéron – Minister of Finance
- Louis Loucheur – Minister of Labour, Hygiene, Welfare Work, and Social Security Provisions
- Lucien Hubert – Minister of Justice
- Georges Leygues – Minister of Marine
- Louis Rollin – Minister of Merchant Marine
- Laurent Eynac – Minister of Air
- Pierre Marraud – Minister of Public Instruction and Fine Arts
- Claudius Gallet – Minister of Pensions
- Jean Hennessy – Minister of Agriculture
- François Piétri – Minister of Colonies
- Georges Pernot – Minister of Public Works
- Louis Germain-Martin – Minister of Posts, Telegraphs, and Telephones
- Pierre Étienne Flandin – Minister of Commerce and Industry

== Tardieu's Second Government, 2 March – 13 December 1930 ==
- André Tardieu – President of the Council and Minister of the Interior
- Aristide Briand – Minister of Foreign Affairs
- André Maginot – Minister of War
- Paul Reynaud – Minister of Finance
- Louis Germain-Martin – Minister of Budget
- Pierre Laval – Minister of Labour and Social Security Provisions
- Raoul Péret – Minister of Justice
- Jacques-Louis Dumesnil – Minister of Marine
- Louis Rollin – Minister of Merchant Marine
- Laurent Eynac – Minister of Air
- Pierre Marraud – Minister of Public Instruction and Fine Arts
- Auguste Champetier de Ribes – Minister of Pensions
- Fernand David – Minister of Agriculture
- François Piétri – Minister of Colonies
- Georges Pernot – Minister of Public Works
- Désiré Ferry – Minister of Public Health
- André Mallarmé – Minister of Posts, Telegraphs, and Telephones
- Pierre Étienne Flandin – Minister of Commerce and Industry

Changes

- 17 November 1930 – Henri Chéron succeeded Péret as Minister of Justice.

== Tardieu's Third Ministry, 20 February – 3 June 1932 ==
- André Tardieu – President of the Council and Minister of Foreign Affairs
- Paul Reynaud – Vice President of the Council and Minister of Justice
- François Piétri – Minister of National Defense
- Albert Mahieu – Minister of the Interior
- Pierre Étienne Flandin – Minister of Finance
- Pierre Laval – Minister of Labour and Social Security Provisions
- Charles Guernier – Minister of Public Works and Merchant Marine
- Mario Roustan – Minister of Public Instruction and Fine Arts
- Auguste Champetier de Ribes – Minister of Pensions and Liberated Regions
- Claude Chauveau – Minister of Agriculture
- Louis de Chappedelaine – Minister of Colonies
- Camille Blaisot – Minister of Public Health
- Louis Rollin – Minister of Commerce, Industry, Posts, Telegraphs, and Telephones

== See also ==
- Interwar France

== Primary sources ==
- Tardieu, André. France and the Alliances: The Struggle for the Balance of Power (Macmillan, 1908) online
- The Truth About The Treaty, written 1921, to defend the French negotiators from claims that they had been too lenient on the Germans.

Political offices
Preceded by Albert Lebrun	Minister of Liberated Regions; 1919–1920	Succeeded by Émile Ogier
Preceded by Orly André-Hesse	Minister of Transportation; 1926–1928	Succeeded by Pierre Forgeot
Preceded by Albert Sarraut	Minister of the Interior; 1928–1930	Succeeded by Camille Chautemps
Preceded by Aristide Briand	Prime Minister of France; 1929–1930	Succeeded by Camille Chautemps
Preceded by Camille Chautemps	Prime Minister of France; 1930	Succeeded by Théodore Steeg
Preceded by Camille Chautemps	Minister of the Interior; 1930	Succeeded by Georges Leygues
Preceded by Victor Boret	Minister of Agriculture; 1931–1932	Succeeded by Achille Fould
Preceded by André Maginot	Minister of War; 1932	Succeeded by François Piétri
Preceded by Pierre Laval	Prime Minister of France; 1932	Succeeded by Édouard Herriot
Preceded by Pierre Laval	Minister of Foreign Affairs; 1932	Succeeded by Édouard Herriot
New office	Minister of State; 1934	Succeeded by Louis Marin
