= List of prime ministers of France who were born in Paris =

This is the list of the former prime ministers of France who were born in Paris.

- Laurent Fabius,
- Jacques Chaban-Delmas,
- Michel Debré,
- Félix Gaillard,
- Pierre Mendès-France,
- René Mayer,
- Léon Blum,
- Pierre Étienne Flandin,
- Camille Chautemps,
- André Tardieu,
- Paul Painlevé,
- Frédéric François-Marsal,
- Alexandre Millerand,
- Léon Bourgeois,
- Jean Casimir-Perier,
- Albert de Broglie,
- Ernest Courtot de Cissey,
- Charles Cousin-Montauban, Comte de Palikao,
- Louis Eugène Cavaignac,
- Louis-Mathieu Molé,
- Victor de Broglie,
- Armand-Emmanuel du Plessis, Duc de Richelieu,
- Charles Maurice de Talleyrand
