= Désiré Ferry =

French politician (1886–1940)

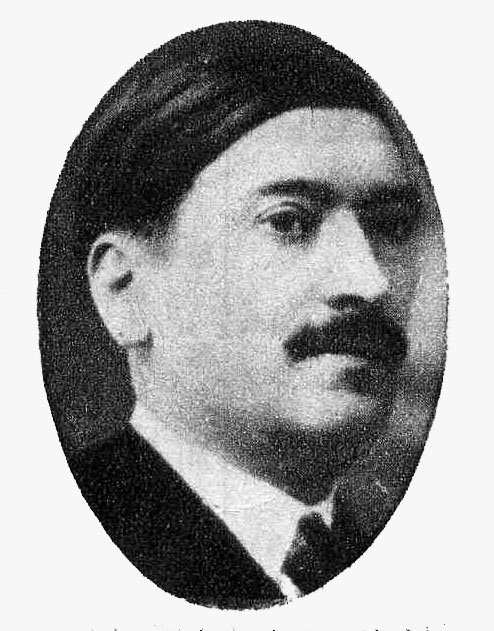
Désiré Ferry

Désiré Ferry (26 October 1886 – 11 January 1940) was a French politician of the Third Republic.

Ferry was born in Metz. He studied law at the University of Nancy and worked as a writer and publisher. During the First World War he served with the French Army. He was three times wounded, promoted to captain, received the Croix de Guerre, and was made a member of Légion d'honneur. This led to his being elected as prime minister of marines.

After the war, Ferry was appointed by Georges Clemenceau to work on the reintegration of the provinces of Alsace-Lorraine which had been recovered from the German Empire. In the 1919 elections, he stood as the junior candidate for the Chamber of Deputies on a list headed by future president Albert Lebrun. The list was elected in its entirety in the overwhelming victory for the Bloc national. Ferry was reelected continuously until 1936, when he lost his seat. He was generally associated with the Fédération républicaine, from 1932 to 1936 with the Republican Centre.

Ferry served as a very successful Minister of Marine in the short-lived government of Frédéric François-Marsal. In 1930, he served as Minister of Health in the second government of André Tardieu. In this job, he did what he could to ameliorate the unhealthy conditions in which French soldiers lived in.

On the outbreak of the Second World War, Ferry was recalled to service as the commandant of the 128th Fortress Infantry Regiment. After having served and commanded fittingly, he died from pulmonary congestion in the freezing temperatures on the Maginot line on 11 January 1940 aged 54.

He had with him two sons during the Second World War. His eldest, Nicolas Ferry, was killed in action at the age of 21. After this, Nicolas's sister, Antoinette Ferry, became Sister Nicolas and went to live in a convent in memory of her brother. In 1941 Désiré Ferry's younger son, Gilles Ferry, was captured at a battle near Brest. He then escaped less than a month later by pretending to be a Nazi soldier. He had to work as a German soldier for over seven days before he was able to get away and go back to France, the only man in the family left. Once the war was over, he became a writer and philosopher.

Preceded by Maurice Bokanowski	Minister of Marine; 1924	Succeeded by Jacques-Louis Dumesnil
Preceded by Louis Loucheur (Marius Roustan)	Minister of Health; 1930	Succeeded by Henri Queuille
