= Émile Ogier =

French politician (1862-1932)

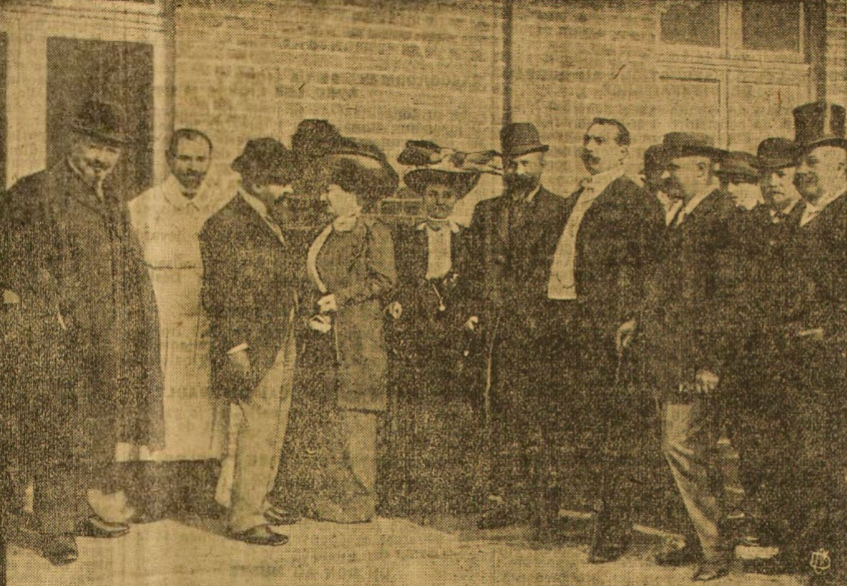
- Ogier (far left) on a visit to Wasquehal

Minister of Liberated Regions
- In office 20 January 1920 – 16 January 1921
- Preceded by: André Tardieu
- Succeeded by: Louis Loucheur

Secretary General of the Ministry of the Interior
- In office 5 July 1911 – 8 October 1925
- President: Armand Fallières
- Preceded by: Henry Huard
- Succeeded by: Jean Chiappe

Prefect of the Meuse
- In office 1 August 1919 – 22 January 1920
- President: Raymond Poincaré
- Preceded by: Maurice Piette
- Succeeded by: Pierre Emery

Personal details
- Born: 6 January 1862 Paris, Second French Empire
- Died: 30 April 1932 (aged 70) Paris, French Third Republic

Émile Ogier (6 January 1862 – 30 April 1932) was a French politician. He primarily served in the governments of Alexandre Millerand and Georges Leygues of the Third Republic.

== Career ==
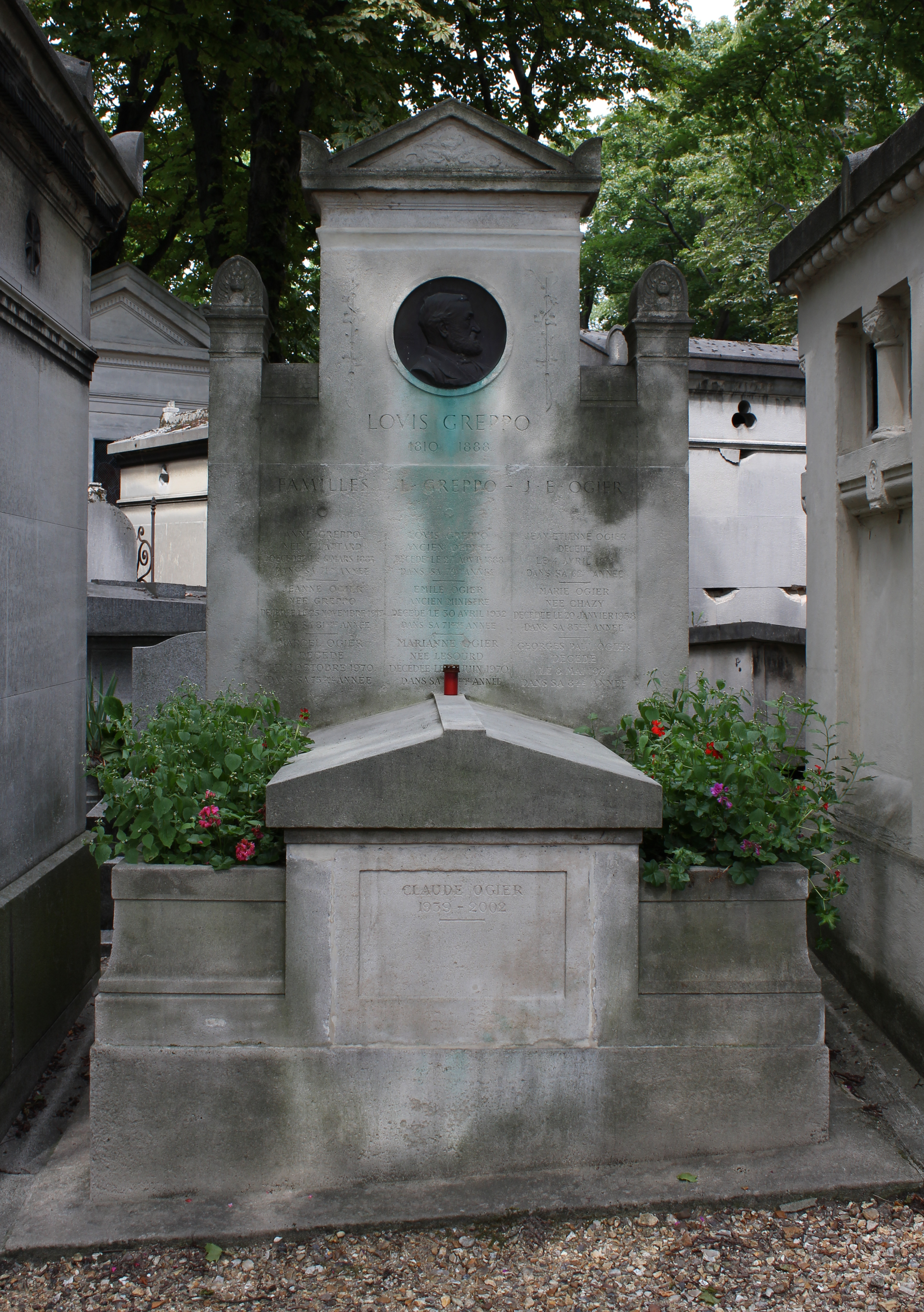
His tomb at Père Lachaise Cemetery.

Ogier's first senior administrative position was as the Inspector of Administrative Services and the Prison Administration from 1901 to 1911. After this, he was the Secretary General of the Ministry of the Interior, being appointed on 5 July 1911. He was later succeeded by Jean Chiappe in this position on 8 October 1925. Ogier was also an advocate for the creation of more hospitals, which he warned about during the end of World War One to the inter-regional hospital unions, which were the predecessor to the Hospital Federation of France.

He would then serve as the Prefect of the Meuse from 1 August 1919 to 22 January 1920. Immediately following his tenure as a prefect, he became Minister of Liberated Regions on 20 January 1920. He was succeeded in this position on 16 January 1921. He was awarded the Legion of Honour with the class of Grand Officer on 26 January 1929. He would die on 30 April 1932.
