= Paul Doumer =

President of France from 1931 to 1932

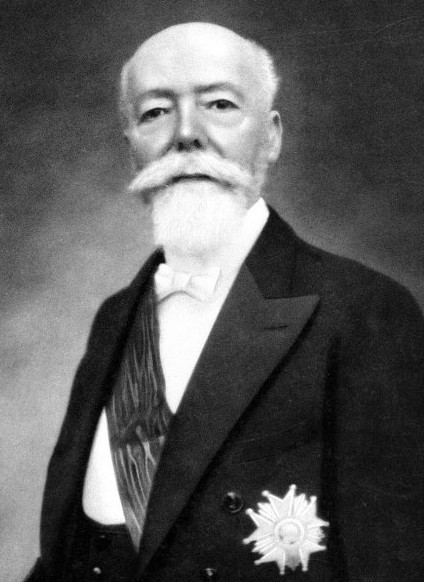
- Doumer in 1931

President of France
- In office 13 June 1931 – 7 May 1932
- Prime Minister: Pierre Laval; André Tardieu
- Preceded by: Gaston Doumergue
- Succeeded by: Albert Lebrun (Note: André Tardieu served as acting president from Doumer's assassination until Lebrun took office)

President of the Senate of Senate
- In office 14 January 1927 – 9 June 1931
- Preceded by: Justin de Selves
- Succeeded by: Albert Lebrun

Minister of Finance of France
- In office 16 December 1925 – 9 March 1926
- President: Gaston Doumergue
- Prime Minister: Aristide Briand
- Preceded by: Louis Loucheur
- Succeeded by: Raoul Péret
- In office 16 January 1921 – 15 January 1922
- President: Alexandre Millerand
- Prime Minister: Aristide Briand
- Preceded by: Frédéric François-Marsal
- Succeeded by: Charles de Lasteyrie
- In office 1 November 1895 – 29 April 1896
- President: Félix Faure
- Prime Minister: Léon Bourgeois
- Preceded by: Alexandre Ribot
- Succeeded by: Georges Cochery

President of the Chamber of Deputies
- In office 10 January 1905 – 31 May 1906
- Preceded by: Henri Brisson
- Succeeded by: Henri Brisson

Governor-General of French Indochina
- In office 13 February 1897 – 14 March 1902
- President: Félix Faure; Émile Loubet
- Prime Minister: Jules Méline; Henri Brisson; Charles Dupuy; Pierre Waldeck-Rousseau
- Minister of the Colonies: André Lebon; Gabriel Hanotaux; Georges Trouillot; Florent Guillain; Albert Decrais
- Preceded by: Armand Rousseau
- Succeeded by: Paul Beau

Personal details
- Born: 22 March 1857 Aurillac, France
- Died: 7 May 1932 (aged 75) Paris, France
- Cause of death: Assassination by gunshot
- Party: Independent
- Education: University of Paris; Conservatoire national des arts et métiers

Joseph Athanase Doumer, commonly known as Paul Doumer (French: [pɔl dumɛːʀ]; 22 March 1857 – 7 May 1932), was a French politician who served as the President of France from June 1931 until his assassination. He is described as "the Father of French Indochina" and was seen as one of the most active and effective governors general of Indochina.

== Early life ==
Joseph Athanase Doumer was born in Aurillac, in the Cantal département of France, on 22 March 1857, into a family of modest means. An alumnus of the Conservatoire national des arts et métiers, he became a professor of mathematics at Mende in 1877.

In 1878, Doumer married Blanche Richel, whom he had met at college. They had eight children, four of whom were killed in the First World War (including the French air ace René Doumer).

== Career ==
From 1879 until 1883 Doumer was professor at Remiremont, before leaving on health grounds. He then became chief editor of Courrier de l'Aisne, a French regional newspaper. Initiated into Freemasonry in 1879, at "L'Union Fraternelle" lodge, he became Grand Secretary of Grand Orient de France in 1892.

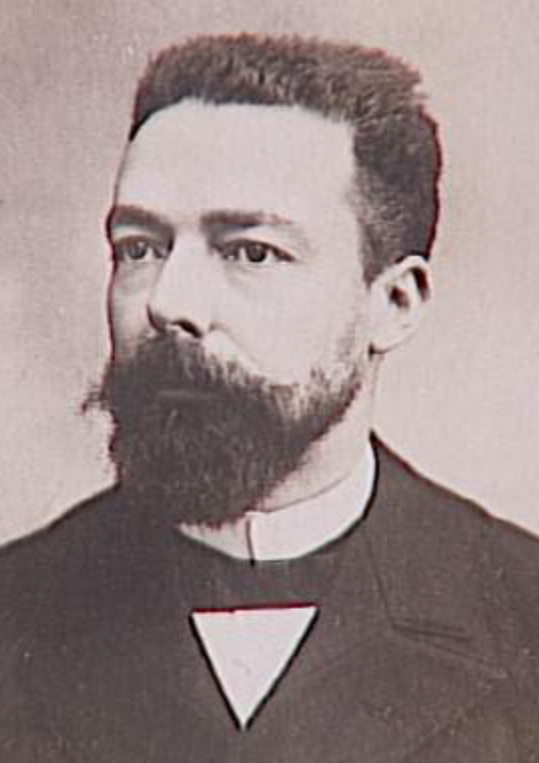
Paul Doumer in a photograph by André-Adolphe-Eugène Disdéri

He made his debut in politics in 1885 as chef de cabinet to Charles Floquet, who was president of the Chamber of Deputies, a post equivalent to the speaker of the House of Commons. In 1888, Doumer was elected Radical deputy for the department of Aisne. Defeated in the general elections of September 1889, he was elected again in 1890 by the arrondissement of Auxerre. He was briefly Minister of Finance of France (1895–1896) in which tried without success to introduce an income tax.

Doumer was Governor-General of French Indochina from 1897 to 1902. Upon his arrival, the colonies were losing millions of francs annually. Determined to put them on a paying basis, he levied taxes on opium, wine and the salt trade. The Vietnamese, Cambodians, and Laotians who could not or would not pay the taxes lost their houses and land, and often became day laborers. He established Indochina as a market for French products and a source of profitable investment by French businessmen. He set about improving Indochina, especially Hanoi, the capital, with modern infrastructure befitting property of France. Tree-lined avenues and a large number of French colonial buildings were constructed in Hanoi during his governance. The Long Bien Bridge and the Grand Palais in Hanoi were among large-scale projects built during his term; the bridge was originally named after him. The palace was destroyed by airstrikes toward the end of the Second World War. The bridge survived, and became a well-known landmark and target for the US Air Force during the Vietnam War.

With a view to annexing southern Yunnan to French Indochina, Doumer successfully lobbied the French government to approve construction of the Indochina-Yunnan railway in 1898.

After returning to France, Doumer was elected by Laon to the Chamber of Deputies as a Radical. He refused to support the ministry of Émile Combes and formed a Radical dissident group, which grew in strength and eventually caused the fall of the ministry. He then served as President of the Chamber from 1902 to 1905. He founded the Institut français de Saint-Pétersbourg in 1911.

Doumer became Minister of Finance again in 1925, when Louis Loucheur resigned. He then served as President of the French Senate from 1927 until the 1931 presidential election. He was elected President of the French Republic on 13 May 1931, defeating the better-known Aristide Briand, and replacing Gaston Doumergue.

== Assassination ==
On 6 May 1932, Paul Doumer was in Paris at the opening of a book fair at the Hôtel Salomon de Rothschild and talking to the author Claude Farrère. Suddenly, several shots were fired by Paul Gorguloff, a Russian émigré. Two of the shots hit Doumer at the base of the skull and in the right armpit, and he fell to the ground. Farrère wrestled with the assassin before the police arrived. Doumer was rushed to the hospital in Paris, where he died at 04:37 on 7 May. He was the second French president to be assassinated but the first to be shot.

While in custody, Gorguloff wrote a confession letter on 9 May 1932, stating that the assassination was a form of protest against the difficulties faced by self-exiled White Russians in Europe and the United States and against France's positive relationship with other Western nations and the Soviet Union.

Gorguloff was indicted for murder and executed by the guillotine four months later.

=== Aftermath ===
André Maurois was an eyewitness to the assassination and had come to the book fair to autograph copies of his book. He later described the scene in his autobiography, Call No Man Happy. As Maurois noted, because the President was assassinated at a meeting of writers, it was decided that writers, Maurois among them, should stand guard over the body while he lay in state at the Élysée.

== Writings ==
As an author he is known by his L'Indo-Chine française (1904), and Le Livre de mes fils (1906).

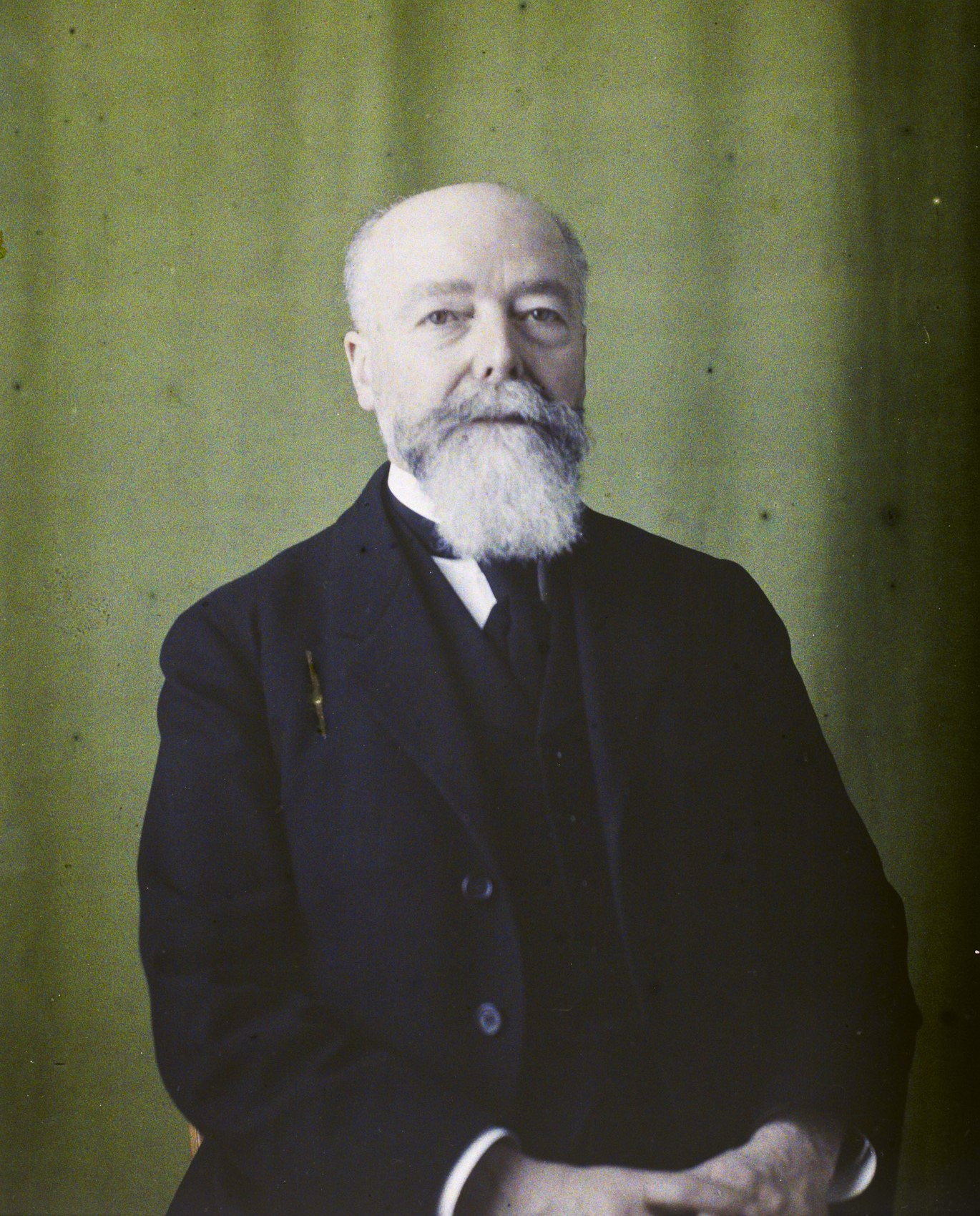
Autochrome portrait by Georges Chevalier, 1921

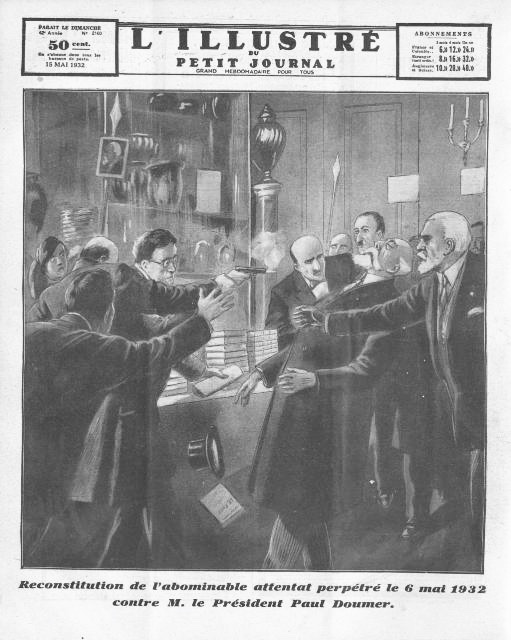
Assassination of Paul Doumer (Le Petit Journal, 15 May 1932)

== See also ==
- List of finance ministers of France
- Politics of France
- Friends of the Natural History Museum Paris, of which he was one of the founders and the second president, in office from 1922 to 1931.
- List of heads of state and government who were assassinated or executed

== Notes ==
Government offices
Preceded by Armand Rousseau	Governor-General of French Indochina; 1897–1902	Succeeded by Paul Beau
Political offices
Preceded by Alexandre Ribot	Minister of Finance; 1895–1896	Succeeded by Georges Cochery
Preceded by Henri Brisson	President of the Chamber of Deputies; 1905–1906	Succeeded by Henri Brisson
Preceded by Frédéric François-Marsal	Minister of Finance; 1921–1922	Succeeded by Charles de Lasteyrie
Preceded by Louis Loucheur	Minister of Finance; 1925–1926	Succeeded by Raoul Péret
Preceded by Justin de Selves	President of the Senate; 1927–1931	Succeeded by Albert Lebrun
Preceded by Gaston Doumergue	President of France; 1931–1932	Succeeded by Albert Lebrun
Regnal titles
Preceded by Gaston Doumergue	Co-Prince of Andorra; 1931–1932; Served alongside: Justí Guitart i Vilardebó	Succeeded by Albert Lebrun
