= Centre républicain =

Centre républicain could refer to:

- Centre républicain (1932)
- Centre républicain (1956)
- Centre Républicain d'Action Rurale et Sociale
- Républicains du centre
