= Louis Marin (politician) =

French politician (1871–1960)

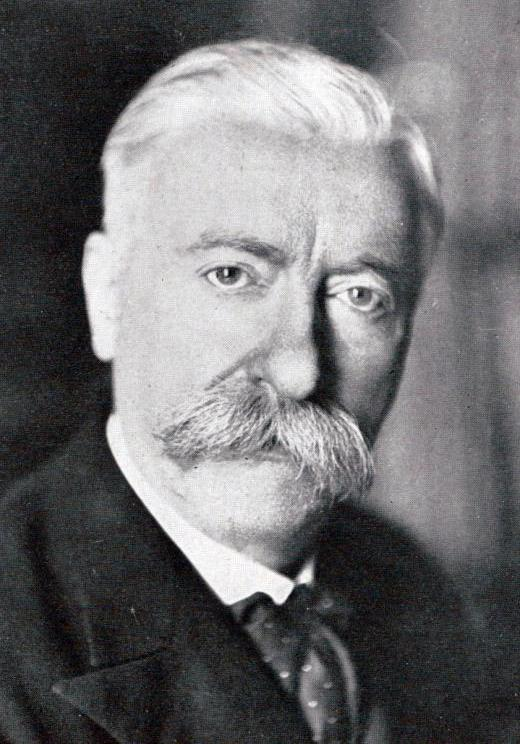

Minister for the Liberated Regions
- In office 29 March 1924 – 14 June 1924
- Prime Minister: Raymond Poincaré
- Preceded by: Charles Reibel
- Succeeded by: Victor Dalbiez

Minister of Pensions
- In office 23 July 1926 – 11 November 1928
- Prime Minister: Raymond Poincaré
- Preceded by: Georges Bonnet
- Succeeded by: Louis Antériou

Minister of Health and Physical Education
- In office 9 February 1934 – 8 November 1934
- Prime Minister: Gaston Doumergue
- Preceded by: Émile Lisbonne
- Succeeded by: Henri Queuille

Minister of State
- In office 8 November 1934 – 24 January 1936

Minister of State
- In office 10 May 1940 – 16 June 1940

Personal details
- Born: 7 February 1871 Faulx, Meurthe, France
- Died: 23 May 1960 (aged 89) Paris, France

Louis Marin (7 February 1871 – 23 May 1960) was a French politician who was Minister for the Liberated Regions in 1924, Minister of Pensions (Veteran Affairs) in 1926–1928 and Minister of Health in 1934.

== Life ==
=== Early years ===
Louis Marin was born on 7 February 1871 in Faulx, Meurthe, a small village in the part of Lorraine that remained French after the settlement of the Franco-Prussian War of 1870. His father was a notary. His mother died during his birth. He attended the Malgrange College, near Nancy, then studied in the Faculty of Law of Nancy before moving to Paris, where he settled in the Latin Quarter. Marin was an avid reader and also had a love of travel. He visited Germany in 1891 and Romania and Serbia the next year, then Algeria. In 1893 he joined the Society of Ethnography that Claude Bernard had founded. He became a permanent member in 1900 and president of the society in 1920.

In 1899 Marin visited Greece, Poland, Russia, Scandinavia, Armenia, Turkestan, Central Asia and Western China. In 1901, he traveled in Siberia, Manchuria, Korea and northern China. Marin was present when the Summer Palace in Beijing was looted and burned. In 1902, he visited Spain and Portugal, and in 1903 visited Asia Minor. In all his travels Marin wanted to apply the concepts of Pierre Guillaume Frédéric le Play and the Ecole d'économie sociale in studying societies. He became involved in the School of Anthropology that Paul Broca had established in 1876, and from 1923 was director of this school.

=== Early political career ===
In 1903 Marin was one of the founding members of the Republican Federation (Fédération républicaine), the largest conservative party during the French Third Republic. He was a lifelong member of this organization, which became the Entente démocratique in 1914 and the Union républicaine démocratique in 1924. In 1924 he was elected president of the group, and in 1925 president of the party. In October 1905 he ran successfully for election as a deputy for the first district of Nancy in a by-election. He was reelected in the same constituency in each election up to World War II. In 1910 he was elected to represent the canton of Nomény in the general council of Meurthe-et-Moselle. He was president of the general council for eighteen years. Marin was extremely active in parliament, involved in many committees and initiating many bills or resolutions. Although his party was right-wing, his political stance was generally moderate and liberal. In 1914 Marin volunteered for the 24th battalion of chasseurs, but returned to sit in the legislature.

=== Inter-War period ===
Marin was Minister for the Liberated Regions from 29 March 1924 to 14 June 1924 in the third cabinet of Raymond Poincaré and the short-lived cabinet of Frédéric François-Marsal. In 1925 he founded the weekly paper La Nation, and regularly wrote the paper's editorial. He was Minister of Pensions from 23 July 1926 to 11 November 1928 in the Poincaré cabinet. In 1931, he chaired the commission of inquiry into the Oustric Affair. He was Minister of Health and Physical Education from 9 February 1934 to 8 November 1934 in the cabinet of Gaston Doumergue. He was Minister of State from 8 November 1934 to 24 January 1936.

=== World War II ===
Marin was again Minister of State from 10 May 1940 to 16 June 1940 - the crucial period beginning with the German invasion of the Low Countries and ending with defeat in the Battle of France. Marin refused to take part in the vote on 10 July 1940 that gave full powers to Marshal Philippe Pétain. Despite being aged 70, he became loosely involved with the French Resistance as a symbol of the Catholic Right Republicans, and was involved in various non-communist groups. He became a titular captain of the Forces françaises de l'intérieur ("French Forces of the Interior", FFI). He reached London on 10 April 1944 after the Gestapo issued a warrant for his arrest. Marin was a member of France's Provisional Consultative Assembly in 1944–45. General Charles de Gaulle offered him a position in the provisional government, but he declined. He received various awards for his activities during the Allied occupation of France.

=== Later career ===
Marin participated in the trial of Philippe Pétain in July–August 1945. He resumed his research and teaching activities, and relaunched La Nation, as a morning paper in which he published long editorials. Marin was elected to the first Constituent Assembly on 21 October 1945, and to the second Constituent Assembly on 2 June 1946. He opposed both draft constitutions. After the second constitution was chosen by the Assembly and ratified by plebiscite, he was elected to the first legislature of the French Fourth Republic in November 1946. He was defeated in the general elections of 17 June 1951, and failed to be elected to the Council of the Republic on 18 May 1952. That year he resigned his presidency of the general council of Meurthe-et-Moselle. He remained active in the academic world and continued to publish works on political or ethnographical subjects. Louis Marin died on 23 May 1960 in Paris at the age of 89.

== Science and academy ==
Marin traveled in Europe and Asia from the age of 19 to the age of 34. He was active in numerous scholarly societies and institutions:

- Collège libre des sciences sociales ("Free College of Social Sciences"); instructor in ethnography from 1895 to 1935
- Société Ethnographique de France ("Ethnographic Society of France")
- École d'anthropologie ("School of Anthropology"); chair from 1923
- Société de géographie commerciale ("Commercial Geography Society"); chair from 1925 to 1960
- Société française de pédagogie ("French Pedagogical Society")
- Société des Amis du Muséum national d'histoire naturelle et du Jardin des plantes ("Friends of the Natural History Museum Paris")
- Institut international d'anthropologie ("International Institute of Anthropology"); President
- Société de statistique de Paris ("Paris Society of Statistics"); President, 1930
- Institut de France; joined 1945

== Mandates ==
Elected	Term end	Constituency	Parliamentary group
1905-10-08	1906-05-31	Meurthe-et-Moselle	Républicains progressistes
1906-05-06	1910-05-31	Meurthe-et-Moselle	Progressiste
1910-04-24	1914-05-31	Meurthe-et-Moselle	Républicain progressiste
1914-04-26	1919-12-07	Meurthe-et-Moselle	Fédération républicaine
1919-11-16	1924-05-31	Meurthe-et-Moselle	Entente républicaine démocratique
1924-05-11	1928-05-31	Meurthe-et-Moselle	Union républicaine démocratique
1928-04-22	1932-05-31	Meurthe-et-Moselle	Union républicaine démocratique
1932-05-01	1936-05-31	Meurthe-et-Moselle	Fédération républicaine
1936-04-26	1942-05-31	Meurthe-et-Moselle	Fédération républicaine de France
1945-10-21	1946-06-10	Meurthe-et-Moselle	Républicains indépendants
1946-06-02	1946-11-27	Meurthe-et-Moselle	Républicains indépendants
1946-11-10	1951-07-04	Meurthe-et-Moselle	Républicains indépendants

== Publications ==
Publications by Louis Marin include:

- Louis Marin, Un grand folkloriste. P. Saintyves (in French), Paris: Larose, p. 72
- Louis Marin (1910), "L'Action de la France dans la Perse constitutionnelle", Bulletin de l'Union franco-persane (in French) (1), Paris: impr. de Wellhoff et Roche: 16
- Louis Marin (1910), "Recul inacceptable de notre influence en Perse", Bulletin de l'Union franco-persane (in French) (2), Paris: impr. de Wellhoff et Roche: 16
- Louis Marin; Paul Strauss (1912), La Protection de la maternité ouvrière (in French), Paris: Association nationale française pour la protection légale des travailleurs, F. Alcan, p. 103
- Paul Deschanel; Eugène Goblet d'Alviella; Louis Marin (1918), L'effort belge (in French), Paris: Comité L'effort de la France et de ses alliés. Bloud et Gay, p. 63
- Louis Marin (1919), preface, L'Opinion publique dans les provinces rhénanes et en Belgique, 1789–1815., by Louis Engerand (in French), Paris: Bossard, p. 187
- Louis Marin (1920), Le Traité de paix (in French), Paris: H. Floury, p. 204
- Louis Marin (1925), "Questionnaire d'ethnographie. Table d'analyse en ethnographie", Bulletin de la Société d'ethnographie de Paris (in French), Paris: Maisonneuve frères: 131
- Louis Marin (1928), preface, L'Indemnité de guerre en droit international, by Luce Camuzet (in French), Paris: A. Pédone, éditeur, p. 40
- Louis Marin (1946), Les veillées lorraines (in French), Paris: Académie des sciences morales et politiques. France; Typographie de Firmin-Didot et Cie, p. 42
- Louis Marin (1946), Louis Marin. La Sécurité de la France (in French), Paris: impr. Deshayes, p. 178
- Louis Marin (1948), La Roumanie que j'ai connue: conférence faite à Paris le 21 octobre 1948 (in French), Paris: Association des journalistes roumains à l'étranger, p. 35
- Louis Marin (1964), Les Contes traditionnels en Lorraine (in French), Paris: impr. Jouve, p. 168
- Louis Marin (1966), Regards sur la Lorraine: réflexions sur des notions fondamentales, particularités du caractère lorrain (in French), Paris: P. Geuthner, p. 216
- Louis Marin (1978), Voyage de 1899 en Orient: Constantinople, Caucase, Arménie, Asie Centrale, Turkestan russe et chinois (in French), Paris: Mme Marin, p. 120
- Louis Marin (1993), Frontières d'Asie (in French), Kenneth White, preface, Paris: Jérôme Ghesquière, Musée Guimet : Impr. nationale, p. 211

== Sources ==
- Armstrong, Hamilton Fish (October 1940). "The Downfall of France". Foreign Affairs. 19 (1): 55–144. JSTOR 20029051.
- collectif (2005). "Marin (Louis)". Dictionnaire des parlementaires français de 1940 à 1958 (in French). Vol. 5. L-0. Paris: La Documentation française. ISBN 2-11-005990-7. Archived from the original on 2016-02-29.
- Jolly, Jean (1960–1977). "Marin (Louis)". Dictionnaire des parlementaires français; notices biographiques sur les ministres, députés et sénateurs français de 1889 à 1940 (in French). Paris: Presses universitaires de France. ISBN 2-1100-1998-0. Archived from the original on 2016-02-29.
- "Louis Marin (1871–1960) – Auteur du texte" (in French). BnF.–
