= Gustave Lhopiteau =

French politician (1860–1941)

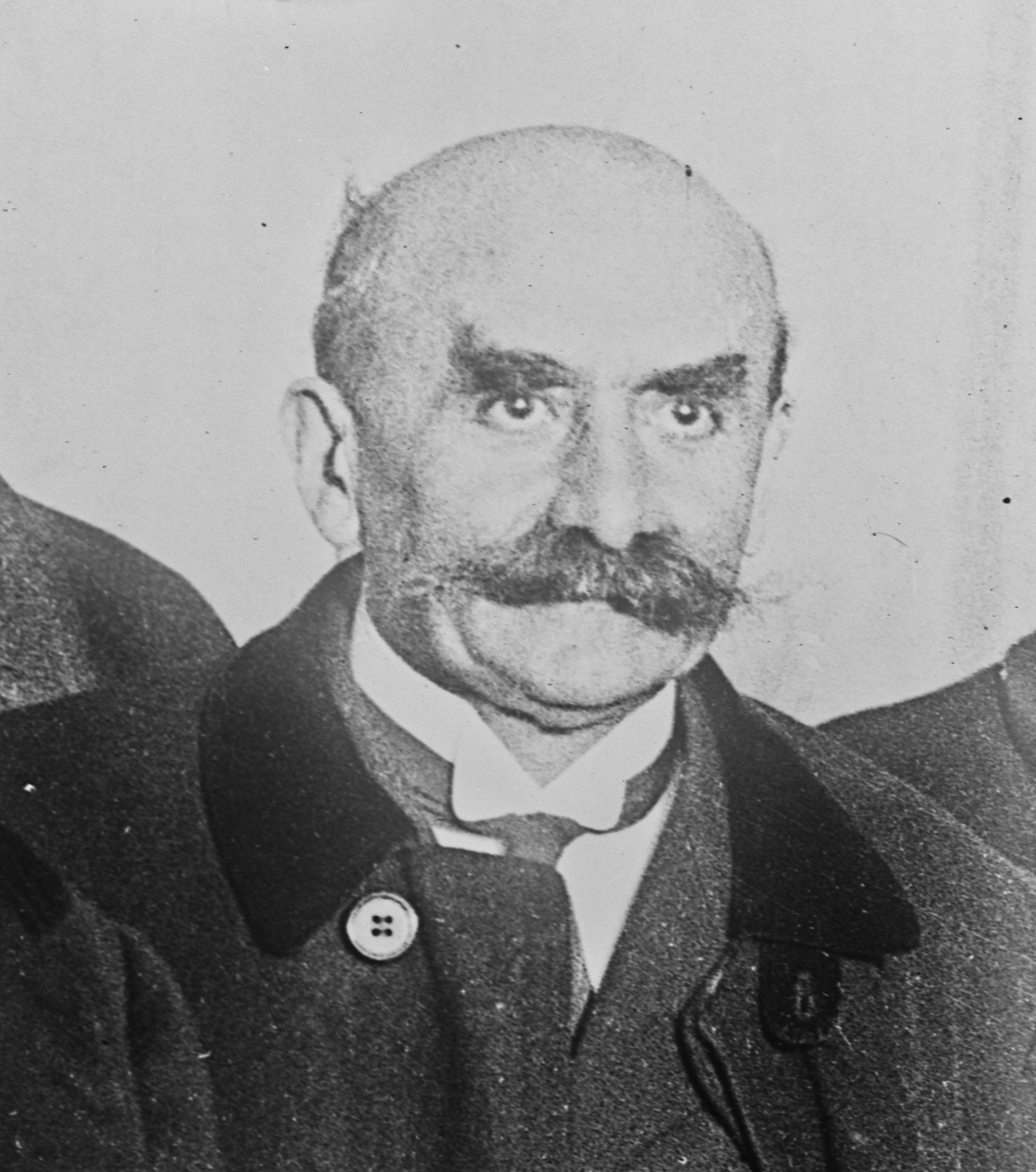
- Lhopiteau in 1920

Minister of Justice
- In office 20 January 1920 – 16 January 1921
- Prime Minister: Alexandre Millerand; Georges Leygues
- Preceded by: Louis Nail
- Succeeded by: Laurent Bonnevay

Senator for Eure-et-Loir
- In office 7 January 1912 – 13 January 1930

Deputy for Eure-et-Loir
- In office 15 October 1893 – 30 January 1912
- Preceded by: Noël Parfait
- Succeeded by: Gabriel Maunoury

Personal details
- Born: Gustave Émile Joseph Lhopiteau; 26 April 1860 Écrosnes, France
- Died: 3 October 1941 (aged 81) Chartres, France
- Party: Radical Party

Gustave Émile Joseph Lhopiteau (also L'hopiteau; French: [ɡystav lɔpito]; 26 April 1860 – 3 October 1941) was a French politician who served as Keeper of the Seals, Minister of Justice from 1920 to 1921 under Prime Ministers Alexandre Millerand and Georges Leygues. A Radical, he represented Eure-et-Loir in both houses of the French Parliament.

Lhopiteau started his political career in 1892 as general councillor of the canton of Maintenon, a position he held until 1922. He was president of the General Council of Eure-et-Loir from 1907 to 1920.

== Key positions held ==
- Deputy for Eure-et-Loir from 1893 to 1912
- Senator for Eure-et-Loir from 1912 to 1930
- Minister of Justice from 1920 to 1921
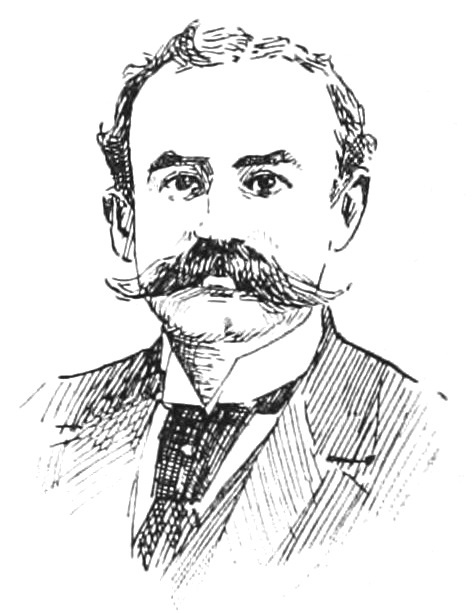
Portrait, 1898

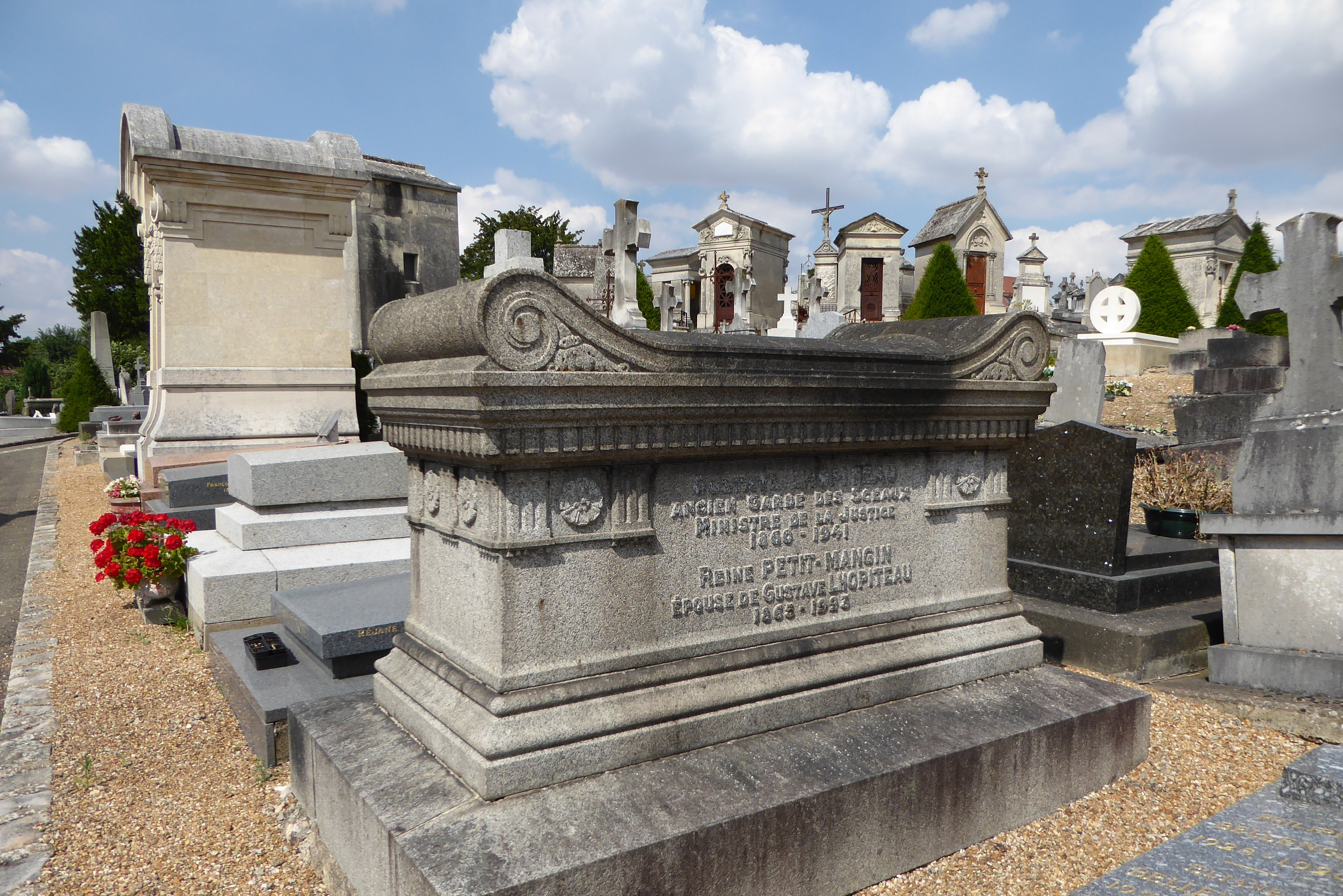
Lhopiteau's tomb in Chartres
