= Attempted assassination of Alexandre Millerand =

1922 assassination attempt on the French president

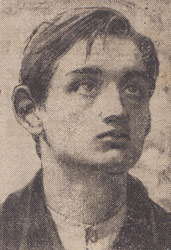
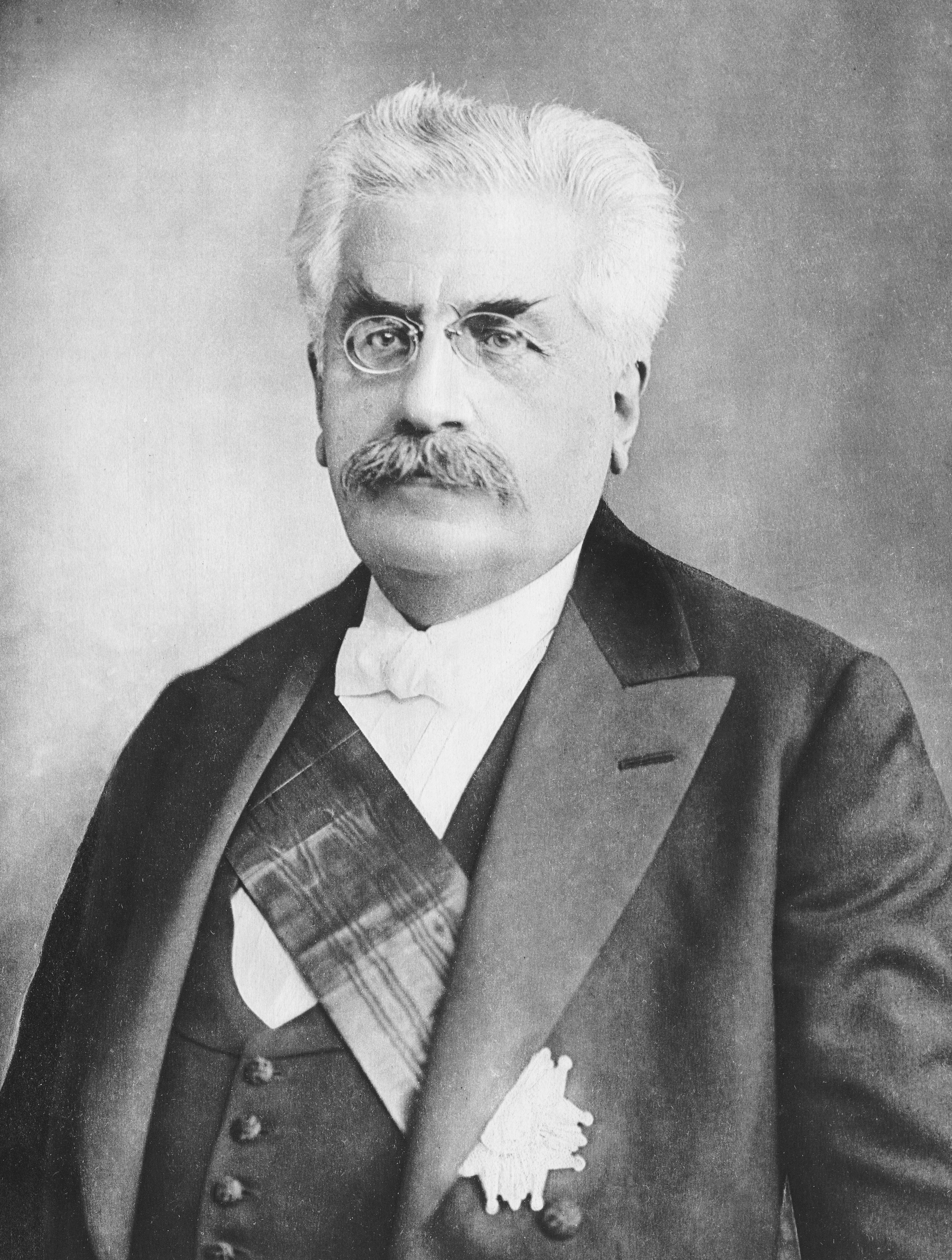
Bouvet and Millerand

On Bastille Day 1922, anarchist Gustave Bouvet attempted to assassinate French President Alexandre Millerand.

== Background ==
Gustave Bouvet (1898–1984) was raised in Angers and moved to Paris as a teenager. He was involved in the Anarchist Youth since his early 20s (1919) and took leadership positions in the Anarchist Federation. Bouvet also wrote for Le Libertaire under the pseudonym Juvénis and sentenced to ten months' imprisonment for printing and publicly posting a leaflet, "To Young Soldiers", in 1921.

== Assassination attempt ==
On July 14, 1922, the French national holiday of Bastille Day, French President Alexandre Millerand traveled in procession, returning from a Longchamps military parade with thousands of troops. As his carriage neared the presidential home, the Élysée Palace, on the Champs Elysees, Gustave Bouvet fired three shots of his revolver at a car, believing it to be the president's. In fact it was the Prefect of Police. The president rode in an open carriage hundreds of feet behind him. The president's Algerian cavalry guard of honor surrounded the president for protection.

Police on bicycle pursued the shooter, plucking Bouvet from a crowd that was assaulting him, and returning him to the police station, where his identity and prior imprisonment was ascertained. President Millerand, in the afternoon, traveled to French General Hubert Lyautey and made him a Marshal of France.

== Aftermath ==
The shooter was sentenced in January 1923 to five years of labor and ten years of banishment from France. However, he was released two years into the sentence, in January 1925, and was partially paralyzed. He would marry and live for another 59 years.
