= Georges Leygues =

Prime Minister of France (1857–1933)

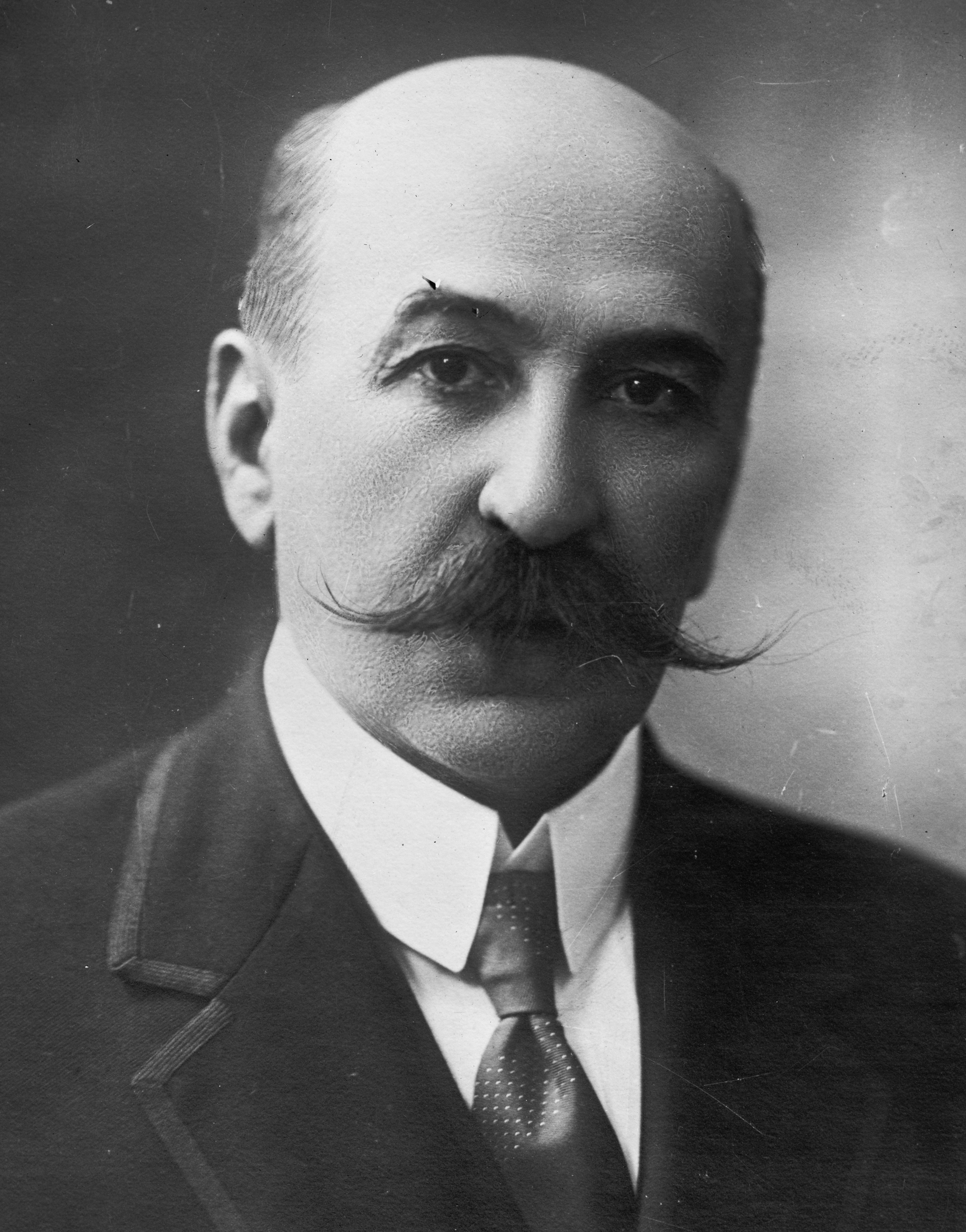

Prime Minister of France
- In office 24 September 1920 – 16 January 1921
- President: Alexandre Millerand
- Preceded by: Alexandre Millerand
- Succeeded by: Aristide Briand

Minister of Foreign Affairs of France
- In office 24 September 1920 – 16 January 1921
- President: Alexandre Millerand
- Prime Minister: Himself
- Preceded by: Alexandre Millerand
- Succeeded by: Aristide Briand

Minister of the Interior of France
- In office 26 January – 1 November 1895
- President: Félix Faure
- Prime Minister: Alexandre Ribot
- Preceded by: Charles Dupuy
- Succeeded by: Léon Bourgeois
- In office 13 December 1930 – 27 January 1931
- President: Gaston Doumergue
- Prime Minister: Théodore Steeg
- Preceded by: André Tardieu
- Succeeded by: Pierre Laval

Minister of Public Instruction of France
- In office 30 May 1894 – 26 January 1895
- President: Sadi Carnot; Charles Dupuy (as interim); Jean Casimir-Perier; Félix Faure
- Prime Minister: Charles Dupuy
- Preceded by: Eugène Spuller
- Succeeded by: Raymond Poincaré
- In office 1 November 1898 – 7 June 1902
- President: Félix Faure; Charles Dupuy (as interim); Émile Loubet
- Prime Minister: Charles Dupuy; Pierre Waldeck-Rousseau
- Preceded by: Léon Bourgeois
- Succeeded by: Joseph Chaumié

Minister of the Colonies of France
- In office 14 March – 25 October 1906
- President: Armand Fallières
- Prime Minister: Ferdinand Sarrien
- Preceded by: Étienne Clémentel
- Succeeded by: Raphaël Milliès-Lacroix

Minister of the Navy of France
- In office 16 November 1917 – 20 January 1920
- President: Raymond Poincaré
- Prime Minister: Georges Clemenceau
- Preceded by: Charles Chaumet
- Succeeded by: Adolphe Landry
- In office 28 November 1925 – 19 July 1926
- President: Gaston Doumergue
- Prime Minister: Aristide Briand
- Preceded by: Émile Borel
- Succeeded by: René Renoult
- In office 23 July 1926 – 21 February 1930
- President: Gaston Doumergue
- Prime Minister: Raymond Poincaré; Aristide Briand; André Tardieu
- Preceded by: René Renoult
- Succeeded by: Albert Sarraut
- In office 3 June 1932 – 2 September 1933
- President: Paul Doumer; Andre Tardieu (as interim); Albert Lebrun
- Prime Minister: Édouard Herriot; Joseph Paul-Boncour; Édouard Daladier
- Preceded by: Charles Dumont
- Succeeded by: Albert Sarraut

Personal details
- Born: 29 October 1856 Villeneuve-sur-Lot
- Died: 2 September 1933 (aged 76) Saint-Cloud
- Party: Democratic Republican Alliance

Georges Leygues (French: [ʒɔʁʒ lɛjɡ]; 29 October 1856 – 2 September 1933) was a French politician of the Third Republic. He held several key ministerial positions, including Minister of the Colonies, Minister of the Interior, Minister of the Navy (Marine), and ultimately served as President of the Council (Prime Minister) from 1920 to 1921.

== Life ==
He was born in Villeneuve-sur-Lot in 1856.

From 1885 until his death, he served as representative of the Lot-et-Garonne region in the Chamber of Deputies.

In January 1895, he was appointed as Minister of the Interior in the government of Alexandre Ribot serving in this role until November 1895.

From 1899 to 1902, he served as Minister of Education in the government of Pierre Waldeck-Rousseau.

On 24 September 1920, he was appointed as Prime Minister by President Alexandre Millerand. He served as Prime Minister until 12 January 1921.

In November 1928, he became Minister of Marine. During his time as Minister of Marine he worked with the navy's chief of staff Henri Salaun in unsuccessful attempts to gain naval re-armament priority for government funding over army rearmament such as the Maginot Line.

He died in 1933.

== Leygues's Ministry, 24 September 1920 – 16 January 1921 ==
- Georges Leygues – President of the Council of Ministers and Minister of Foreign Affairs
- André Joseph Lefèvre – Minister of War
- Théodore Steeg – Minister of the Interior
- Frédéric François-Marsal – Minister of Finance
- Paul Jourdain – Minister of Labour
- Gustave L'Hopiteau – Minister of Justice
- Adolphe Landry – Minister of Marine
- André Honnorat – Minister of Public Instruction and Fine Arts
- André Maginot – Minister of War Pensions, Grants, and Allowances
- Joseph Ricard – Minister of Agriculture
- Albert Sarraut – Minister of Colonies
- Yves Le Trocquer – Minister of Public Works
- Auguste Isaac – Minister of Commerce and Industry
- Émile Ogier – Minister of Liberated Regions

Changes

- 16 December 1920 – Flaminius Raiberti succeeds Lefèvre as Minister of War.

== Legacy ==
Besides the Îles Leygues, in the Kerguelens, two French warships have been named for Georges Leygues:

- a light cruiser Georges Leygues that served in the Second World War
- an F70-type frigate Georges Leygues. The ship was decommissioned in 2014.

Political offices
| Preceded by Eugène Spuller | Minister of Public Instruction and Fine Arts; 1894–1895 | Succeeded by Raymond Poincaré |
| Preceded by Charles Dupuy | Minister of the Interior; 1895 | Succeeded by Léon Bourgeois |
| Preceded by Léon Bourgeois | Minister of Public Instruction and Fine Arts; 1898–1902 | Succeeded by Joseph Chaumié |
| Preceded by Étienne Clémentel | Minister of Colonies; 1906 | Succeeded by Raphaël Milliès-Lacroix |
| Preceded by Charles Chaumet | Minister of Marine; 1917–1920 | Succeeded by Adolphe Landry |
| Preceded by Alexandre Millerand | Prime Minister of France; 1920–1921 | Succeeded by Aristide Briand |
| Preceded by Alexandre Millerand | Minister of Foreign Affairs; 1920–1921 | Succeeded by Aristide Briand |
| Preceded by Émile Borel | Minister of Marine; 1925–1926 | Succeeded by René Renoult |
| Preceded by René Renoult | Minister of Marine; 1926–1930 | Succeeded by Albert Sarraut |
| Preceded by André Tardieu | Minister of the Interior; 1930–1931 | Succeeded by Pierre Laval |
| Preceded by Charles Dumont | Minister of Marine; 1932–1933 | Succeeded by Albert Sarraut |
