= Claude Chauveau =

French politician

- Born: 22 August 1861; Pouilly-en-Auxois, Côte-d'Or, France
- Died: 27 February 1940 (aged 78); Pouilly-en-Auxois, Côte-d'Or, France
- Occupation: Politician

Claude Chauveau (French pronunciation: [klod ʃovo]; 22 August 1861 – 27 February 1940) was a French politician. He served as a member of the French Senate from 1910 to 1940, representing Côte-d'Or.
