= Albert Mahieu =

French politician

- Born: 17 January 1860; Cherbourg-en-Cotentin, Manche, France
- Died: 25 May 1926 (aged 66); Cherbourg, Manche, France
- Occupation: Politician

Albert Mahieu (1860–1926) was a French politician. He served as a member of the Chamber of Deputies from 1906 to 1919, representing Manche.
