= Faulx =

- Commune
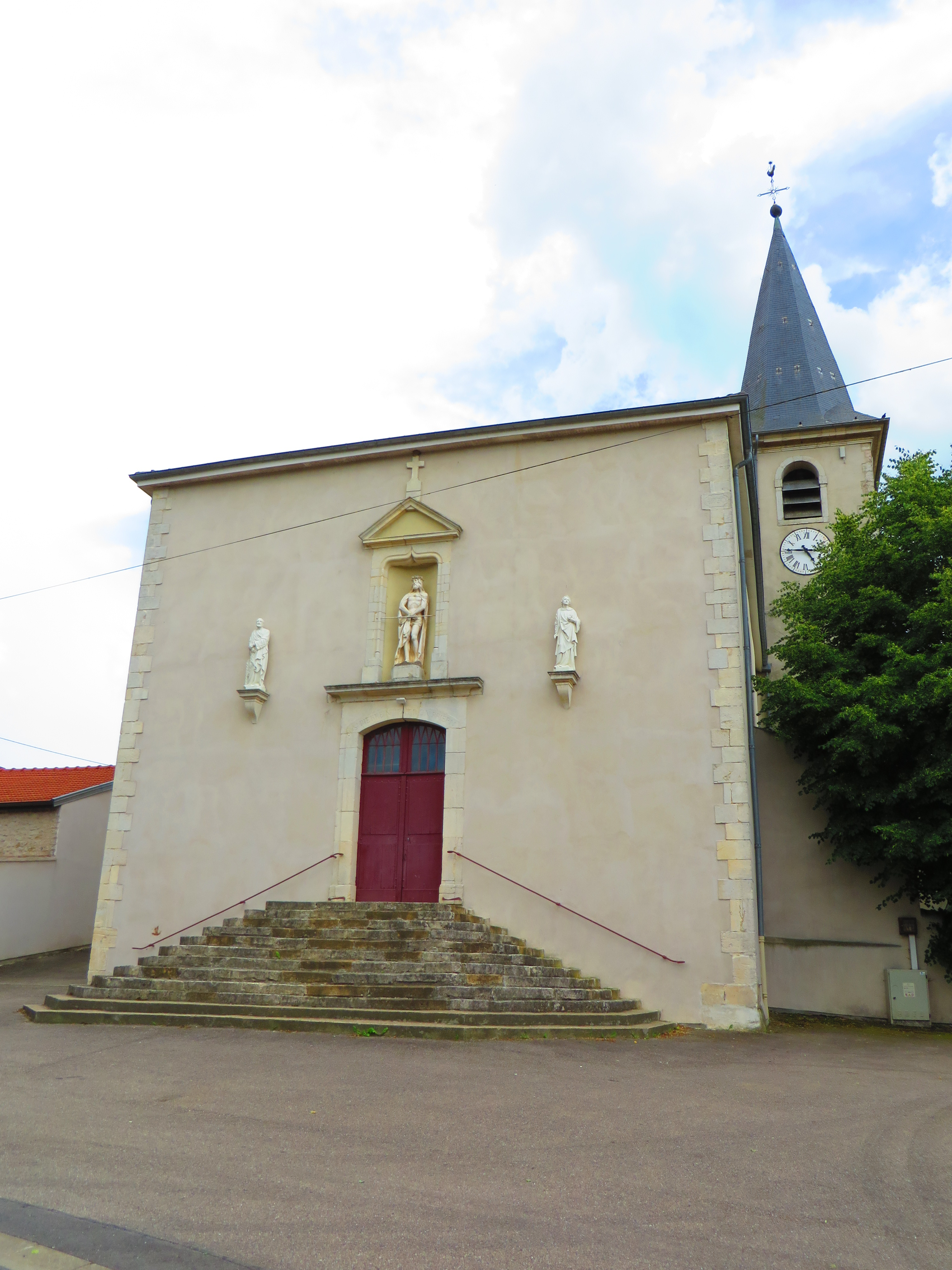
- The church in Faulx

- Coat of arms
- Location of Faulx
- Location within France Location within Grand Est
- Coordinates: 48°47′37″N 6°11′56″E
- Country: France
- Region: Grand Est
- Department: Meurthe-et-Moselle
- Arrondissement: Nancy
- Canton: Entre Seille et Meurthe
- Intercommunality: Bassin de Pompey

Government
  - Mayor (2020–2026): Dominique Grandieu
- Area^{1}: 17.2 km^{2} (6.6 sq mi)
- Elevation: 285 m (935 ft)
- Highest elevation: 412 m (1,352 ft)
- Lowest elevation: 215 m (705 ft)
- Population (2023): 1,370
  - Density: 79.7/km^{2} (206/sq mi)
- Time zone: UTC+01:00 (CET)
  - Summer (DST): UTC+02:00 (CEST)
- INSEE/Postal code: 54188 /54760
- ^{1} French Land Register data, which excludes lakes, ponds, glaciers > 1 km^{2} (0.386 sq mi or 247 acres) and river estuaries.

Faulx (French pronunciation: [fo]) is a commune located in the Meurthe-et-Moselle department in north-eastern France.

== See also ==
- Communes of the Meurthe-et-Moselle department
