= Victor Dalbiez =

French politician

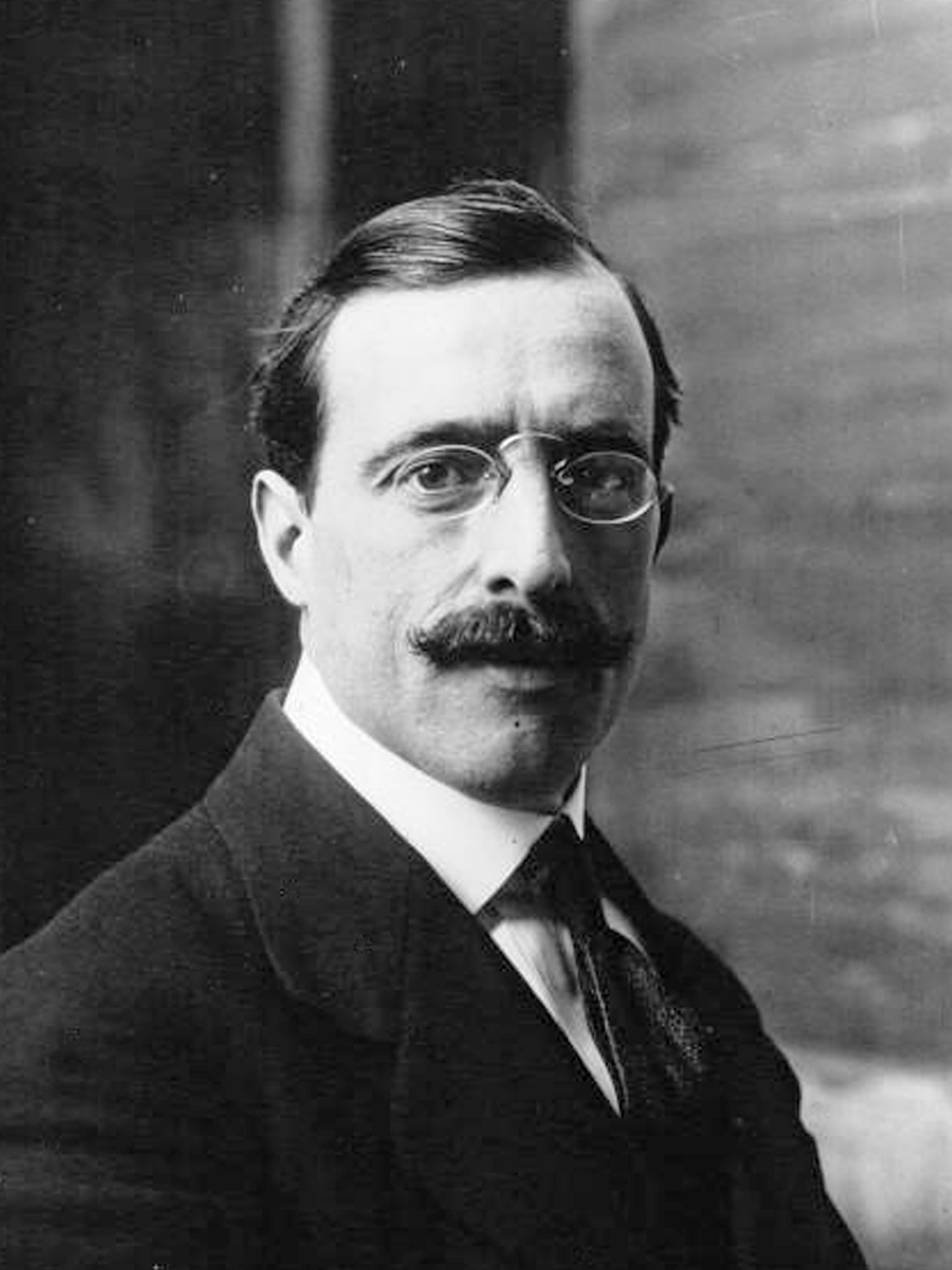
Victor Dalbiez

Victor Dalbiez (1876 – April 29, 1954) was a French politician. He served as a member of the National Assembly of France from 1909 to 1927, as French Senator from 1927 to 1935, and as Minister of Free Regions from June 14, 1924, to April 17, 1925.

Dalbiez was born in Corneilla-de-Conflent, Pyrénées-Orientales, France. His father was the Mayor of Corneilla-de-Conflent. He went to school in Perpignan.

He wrote for Le Petit Catalan and became the editor of La Montagne.

He served as a member of the National Assembly of France from 1909 to 1927, as French Senator from 1927 to 1935, and as Minister of Liberated Regions from June 14, 1924, to April 17, 1925. He also served as Mayor of Perpignan from 1929 to 1935. He was in favour of the income tax, supported workers' rights and Laïcité.

He died on April 29, 1954, in Les Pavillons-sous-Bois, Seine-saint-Denis, France.
