= Hospital Federation of France =

Fédération hospitalière de France
- Fédération hospitalière de France
- Formation: 1924
- Legal status: Association under the 1901 law
- Location: Paris
- Leader: Frédéric Valletoux
- Website: https://www.fhf.fr/

The Hospital Federation of France was founded in 1924 from the merger of the five inter-regional hospital unions. It is a non-profit association established under the Association law of 1 July 1901.

The members include more than 1,000 public health establishments (hospitals) and as many medico-social structures (retirement homes and independent specialized shelters), i.e. almost all public sector health and social care institutions.

Its main aims are:

- Promotion of the public hospital and medico-social establishments;
- Information of professionals;
- Representation of establishments.

It appoints representatives to:

- the Higher Council of Hospitals,
- the Higher Council of the Public Hospital Service,
- the National and Regional Commissions of the Health and Social Organization,
- the Caisse nationale de solidarité pour l'autonomie,
- the National Advisory Council for People with Disabilities,
- National Staff Retirement Fund, Social Work Management Committee, and
- the National Association for Continuing Education of Hospital Staff.

It is also active at the international level. Guy Collet is the Strategy Advisor of the Federation.
