= Centre républicain (1932) =

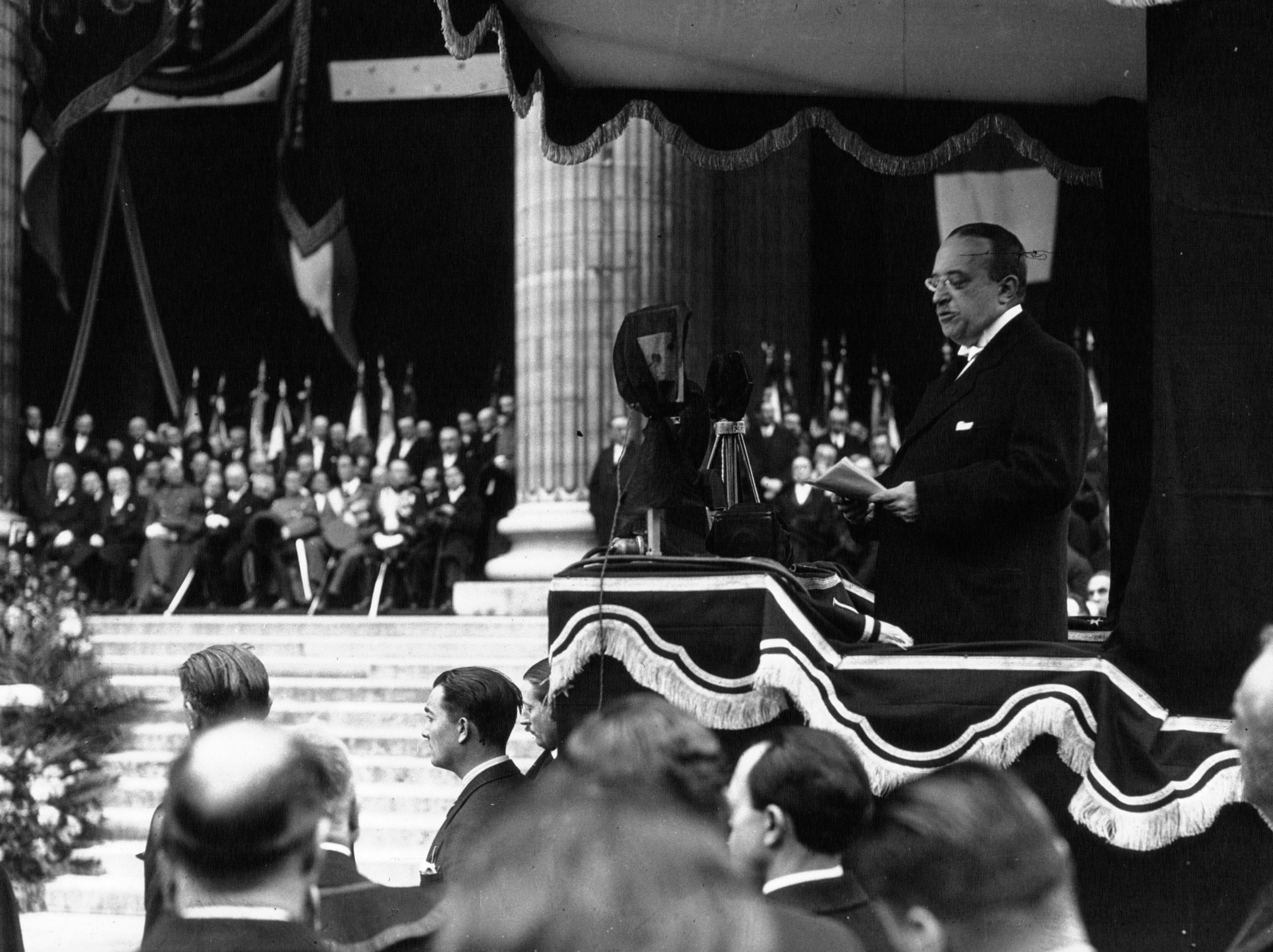
- André Tardieu in 1932
- Leader: André Tardieu
- Founded: 1932
- Dissolved: 1936
- Succeeded by: Alliance of Left Republicans and Independent Radicals
- Ideology: Antiparliamentarism; Bonapartism (Plebiscitary Right)
- Political position: Right
- Colors
- Chamber of Deputies: 34 / 608

The Centre républicain was a right-wing parliamentary group in the Chamber of Deputies of the French Third Republic from 1932 to 1936. The group was critical of parliamentarism and advocated for plebiscitary democracy and a strong executive.

== History ==
The Centre républicain was established in 1932 by André Tardieu after his unsuccessful attempt to take control of the Democratic Republican Alliance, in order to transform it into a large liberal-conservative party. Positioned firmly on the right, the group dissolved after the 1936 elections when Tardieu failed to retain his seat.

== Ideology ==
The group aligned with the principles laid out in Tardieu's book, *Réforme de l'État*. These included removing the right of the Parliament to initiate expenditures, creating the position of Prime Minister, granting the Prime Minister the power to dissolve the Chamber of Deputies, enfranchising women, and advocating for the use of referendums.

Criticism of parliamentary dominance in interwar France was not exclusive to the Centre républicain:

- Charles Maurras and the Action française opposed parliamentary governance, advocating for a monarchy underpinned by decentralization.
- The Ligue de la jeune République supported state reform and aligned with Pierre Mendès France post-World War II.
- The Jeunes Turcs of the Radical Party also sought reform and later backed Mendès France.

These movements influenced the foundation of the Fifth Republic.

== Members ==
Below is a summary of notable members of the Centre républicain:

Name	Department	Party before joining	Alignment during Centre républicain tenure	Party after 1936
André Tardieu	Territoire de Belfort	Democratic Republican Alliance	Centre républicain	-
Louis Jacquinot	Meuse	-	Centre républicain	Alliance of Left Republicans and Independent Radicals
Paul Reynaud	Seine	Action démocratique et sociale	Centre républicain	Alliance of Left Republicans and Independent Radicals
