= Frédéric François-Marsal =

Prime Minister of France (1874–1958)

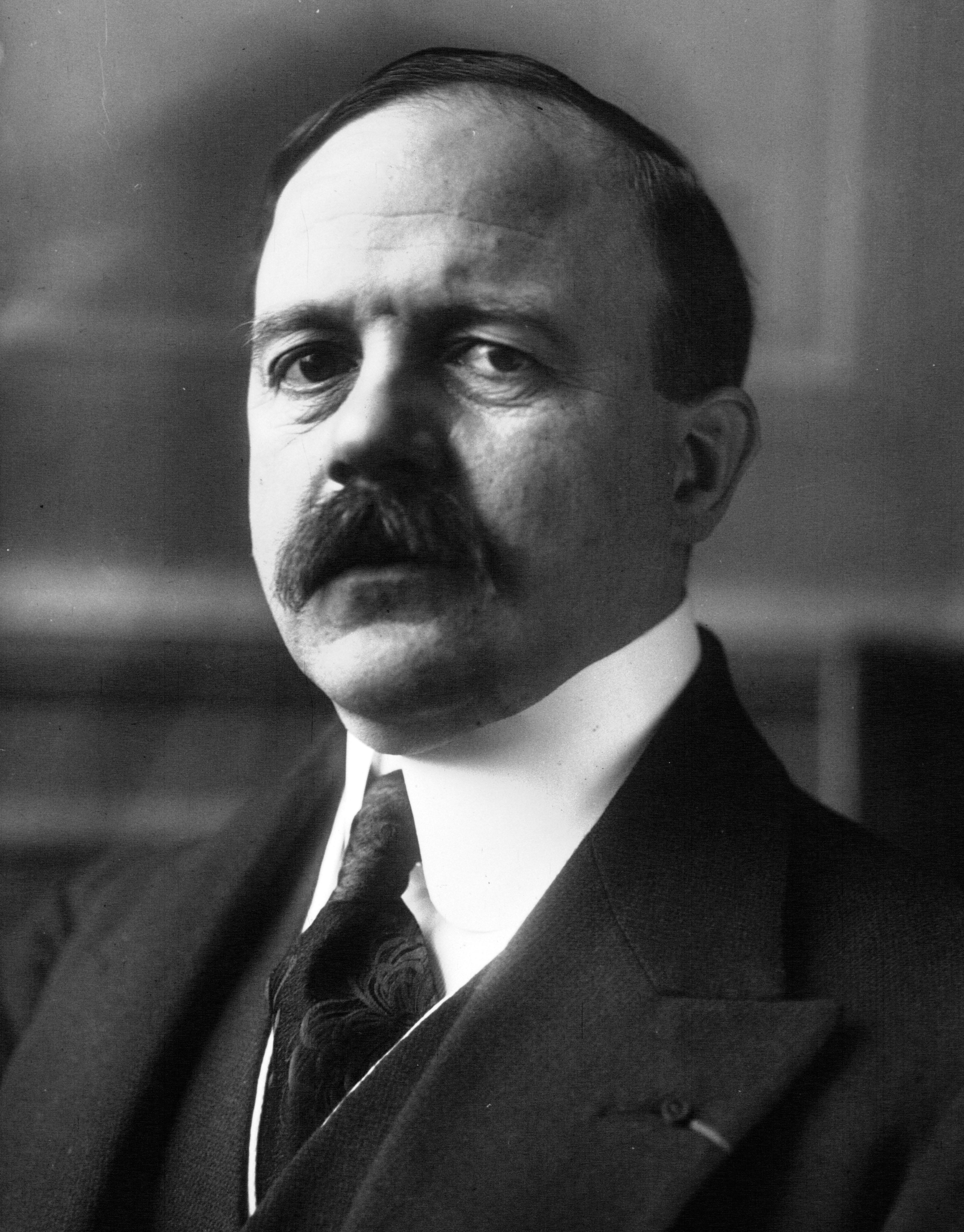

Prime Minister of France
- In office 8 June 1924 – 15 June 1924
- President: Alexandre Millerand; Himself (acting); Gaston Doumergue
- Preceded by: Raymond Poincaré
- Succeeded by: Édouard Herriot

Acting President of France
- In office 11 June 1924 – 13 June 1924
- Prime Minister: Himself
- Preceded by: Alexandre Millerand
- Succeeded by: Gaston Doumergue

Personal details
- Born: 16 March 1874 Paris, France
- Died: 20 May 1958 (aged 84) Gisors
- Party: Independent

Frédéric François-Marsal (French: [fʁedeʁik fʁɑ̃swa maʁsal]; 16 March 1874 – 20 May 1958) was a French politician of the Third Republic, who served briefly as Prime Minister in 1924. Due to his premiership he also served for two days (11–13 June 1924) as the Acting President of the French Republic between the resignation of Alexandre Millerand and the election of Gaston Doumergue.

== François-Marsal's Ministry, 8–15 June 1924 ==
- Frédéric François-Marsal- President of the Council and Minister of Finance
- Edmond Lefebvre du Prey - Minister of Foreign Affairs
- André Maginot - Minister of War
- Justin de Selves - Minister of the Interior
- Paul Jourdain - Minister of Labour and Hygiene
- Antony Ratier - Minister of Justice
- Désiré Ferry - Minister of Marine
- Adolphe Landry - Minister of Public Instruction, Fine Arts, and Technical Education
- Joseph Capus - Minister of Agriculture
- Jean Fabry - Minister of Colonies
- Yves Le Trocquer - Minister of Public Works, Ports, and Marine
- Pierre Étienne Flandin - Minister of Commerce, Industry, Posts, and Telegraphs
- Louis Marin - Minister of Liberated Regions

Political offices
Preceded by Raymond Poincaré	Prime Minister of France; 1924	Succeeded by Édouard Herriot
