= Alexandre Millerand =

French lawyer and statesman (1859–1943)

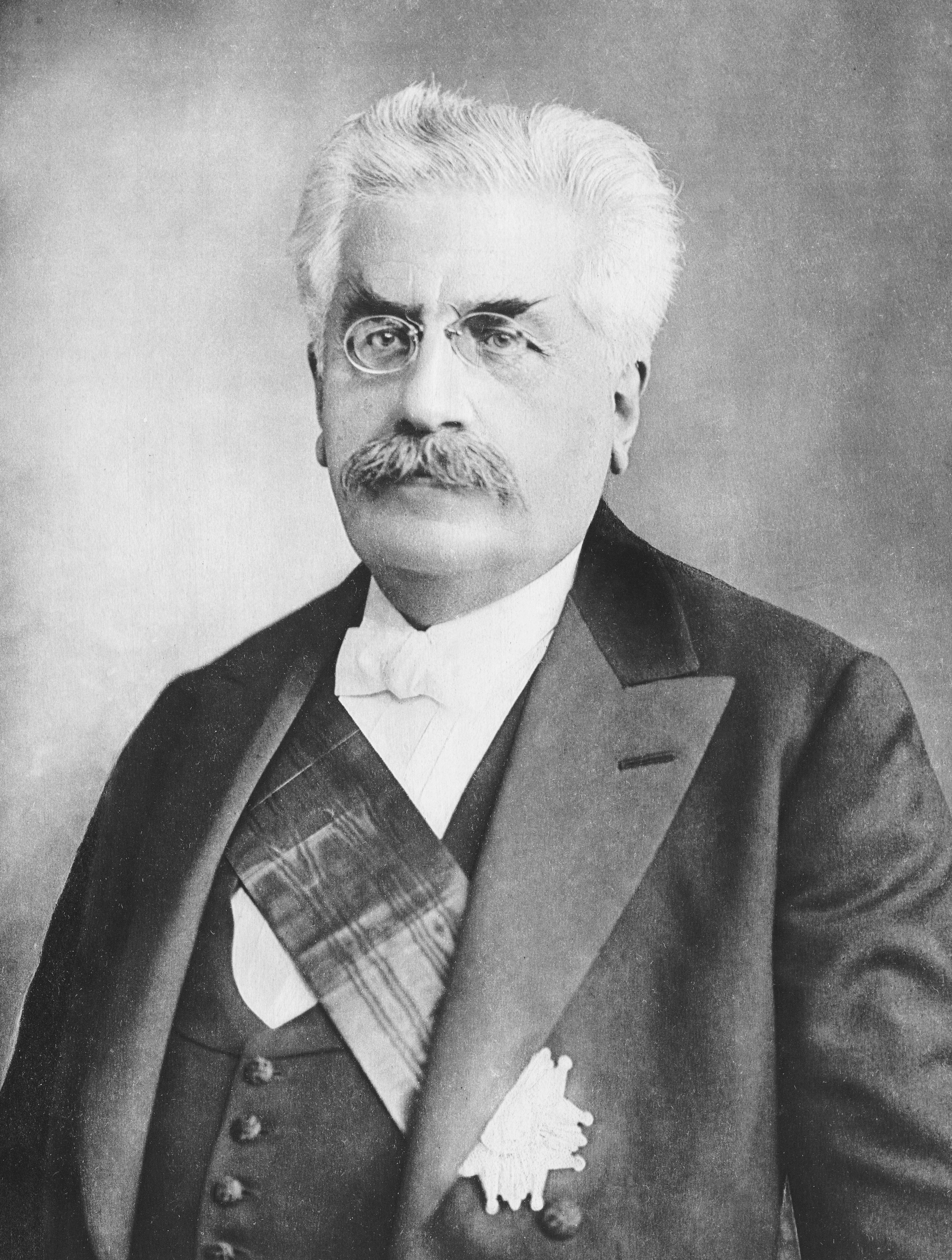
- Millerand in 1920

President of France
- In office 23 September 1920 – 11 June 1924
- Prime Minister: Georges Leygues; Aristide Briand; Raymond Poincaré; Frédéric François-Marsal
- Preceded by: Paul Deschanel
- Succeeded by: Gaston Doumergue

Prime Minister of France
- In office 20 January 1920 – 23 September 1920
- President: Raymond Poincaré; Paul Deschanel
- Preceded by: Georges Clemenceau
- Succeeded by: Georges Leygues

Minister of Foreign Affairs
- In office 20 January 1920 – 23 September 1920
- Prime Minister: Himself
- Preceded by: Georges Clemenceau
- Succeeded by: Georges Leygues

Minister of War
- In office 26 August 1914 – 29 October 1915
- Prime Minister: René Viviani
- Preceded by: Adolphe Messimy
- Succeeded by: Joseph Gallieni
- In office 14 January 1912 – 12 January 1913
- Prime Minister: Raymond Poincaré
- Preceded by: Adolphe Messimy
- Succeeded by: Albert Lebrun

Minister of Public Works, Posts and Telegraphs
- In office 24 July 1909 – 3 November 1910
- Prime Minister: Aristide Briand
- Preceded by: Louis Barthou
- Succeeded by: Louis Puech

Minister of Commerce, Industry, Posts and Telegraphs
- In office 22 June 1899 – 7 June 1902
- Prime Minister: Pierre Waldeck-Rousseau
- Preceded by: Paul Delombre
- Succeeded by: Georges Trouillot

Personal details
- Born: 10 February 1859 Paris, France
- Died: 6 April 1943 (aged 84) Versailles, Occupied France
- Party: French Socialist Party (1902–1904); Republican-Socialist Party (1911–1912); Independent (1912–1940)
- Spouse: Jeanne Millerand (m. 1898–1943)
- Children: Jean (1899–1972); Alice (1902–80); Jacques (1904–79); Marthe (1909–75)
- Education: University of Paris
- Profession: Lawyer, journalist

Alexandre Millerand (French: [alɛksɑ̃dʁ milʁɑ̃]; 10 February 1859 – 6 April 1943) was a French politician who served as President of France from 1920 to 1924, having previously served as Prime Minister of France earlier in 1920. His participation in Waldeck-Rousseau's cabinet at the start of the 20th century, alongside the Marquis de Galliffet, who had directed the repression of the 1871 Paris Commune, sparked a debate in the French Section of the Workers' International (SFIO) and in the Second International about the participation of socialists in bourgeois governments.

In 1912 Millerand was appointed as war minister in Poincaré's cabinet. He returned to the same post during the first year of World War I, helping set French war strategy. After Clemenceau's defeat in 1920, Millerand formed a cabinet and held both the premiership and the ministry of Foreign Affairs. In 1920–1924 he served as president of France. He faced criticism for openly supporting conservative candidates in the 1924 elections and the left majority forced his resignation. Thereafter he played only a minor role in politics.

== Biography ==
=== Early life and religion ===
Millerand was brought up in Paris, to Jean-François Millerand and Amélie-Mélanie Cahen. His mother was of Alsatian Jewish origin, while his paternal family originated from Franche-Comté.

Millerand was baptized in 1860, while his mother converted to Catholicism. However, Millerand later became an agnostic, even going as far as to participate in a civil marriage ceremony. None of his children were baptized either.

=== Early activism ===
Born in Paris, he was educated for the bar and was elected Secrétaire of the Conférence des avocats du barreau de Paris. He made his reputation through his defence, in company with Georges Laguerre, of Ernest Roche and Duc-Quercy, the instigators of the strike at Decazeville in 1883. He then took Laguerre's place on Georges Clemenceau's newspaper, La Justice. He was a freemason between 1883 and 1905.

He was elected to the Chamber of Deputies for the Seine département in 1885 as a Radical Socialist. He was associated with Clemenceau and Camille Pelletan as an arbitrator in the Carmaux strike (1892). He had long had the ear of the Chamber in matters of social legislation, and after the Panama scandals had discredited so many politicians, his influence grew.

He was chief of the Independent Socialist faction, a group which then mustered sixty members. Until 1896, he edited their newspaper, La Petite République. His programme included the collective ownership of the means of production and the international association of labour.

=== Government minister ===
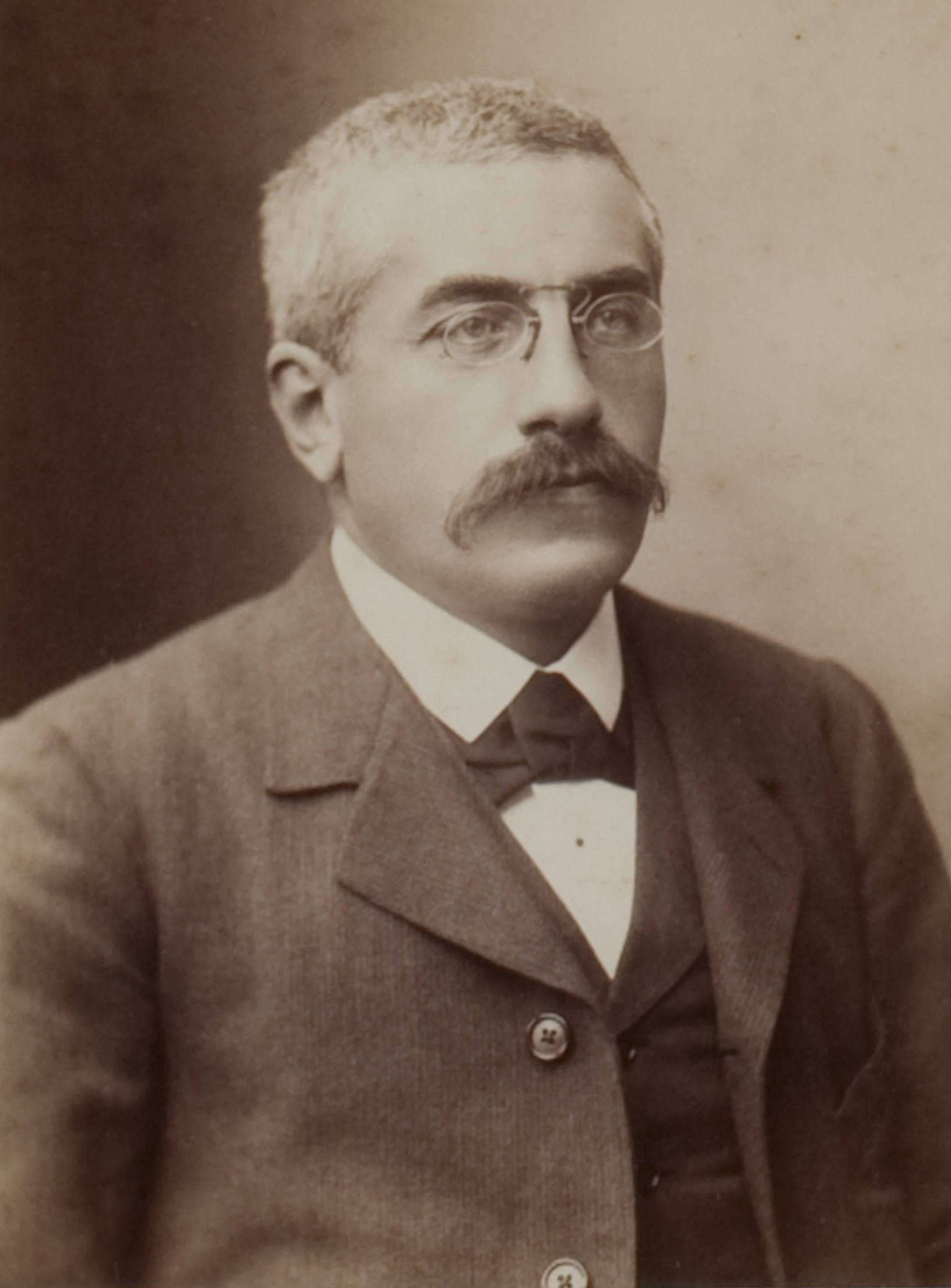
Alexandre Millerand, by Paul Nadar, c. 1900

In June 1899 he entered Pierre Waldeck-Rousseau's cabinet of "republican defence" as Minister of Commerce. In contrast to his earlier activism, he now limited himself to practical reforms, devoting his attention to the improvement of the merchant marine, to the development of trade, of technical education, of the postal system, and to the amelioration of the conditions of labour. Labour questions were entrusted to a separate department, the Direction du Travail, and the pension and insurance office was also raised to the status of a "direction".

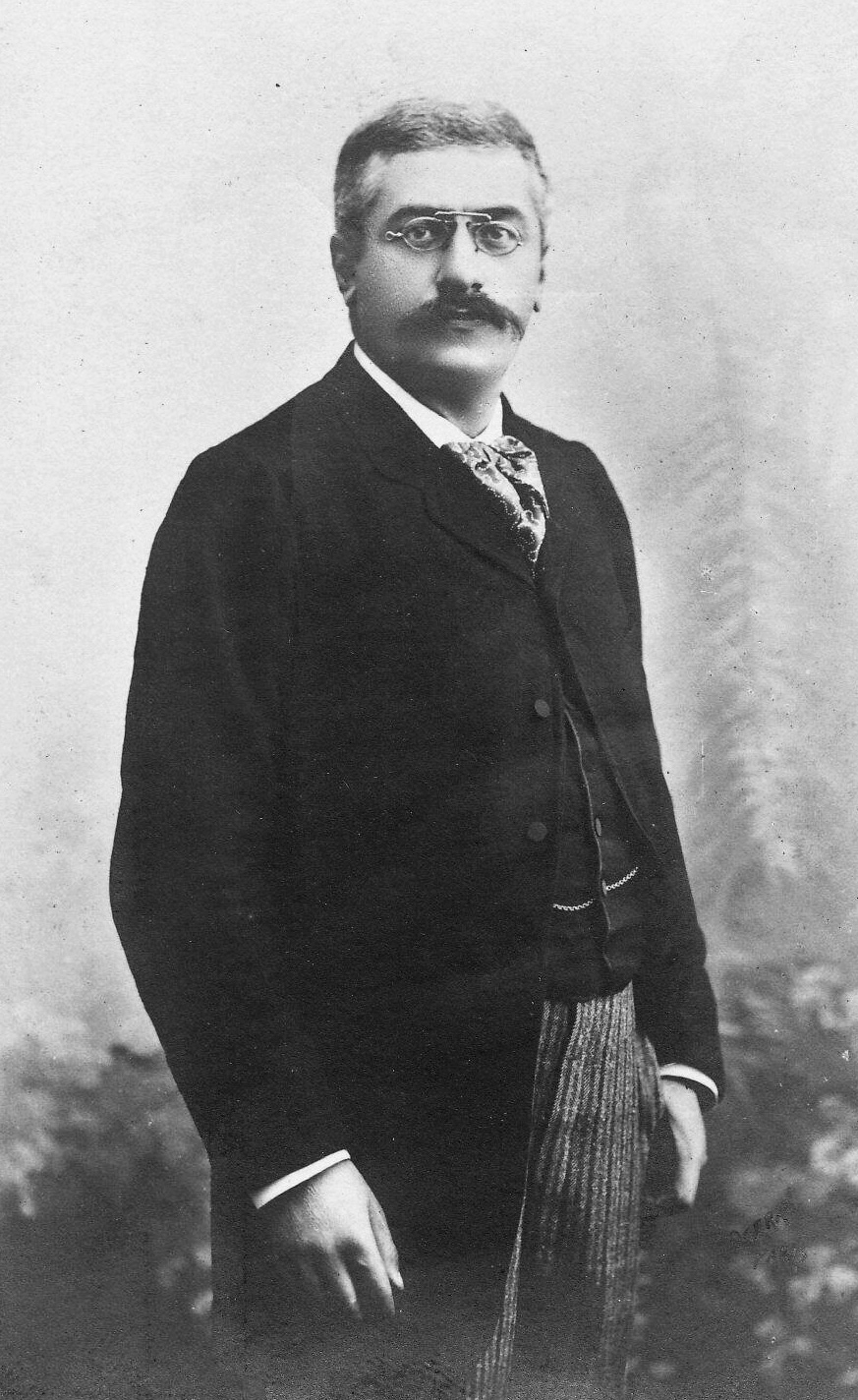
Alexandre Millerand in 1900

In 1902, he did not join fellow independent socialist Jean Jaurès in forming the Parti Socialiste Français, but in 1907 instead formed the small Independent Socialist Party, which became the Republican-Socialist Party (PRS) in 1911. His influence with the far-left had already declined, for it was said that his departure from the true Marxist tradition had disintegrated the movement.

In 1909/1910, he served as Minister of Public Works, Posts and Telegraphs.

As labour minister, he was responsible for the introduction of a wide range of reforms, including the reduction in the maximum workday from 11 to 10 hours in 1904, the introduction of an 8-hour workday for postal employees, the prescribing of maximum hours and minimum wages for all work undertaken by public authorities, the bringing of workers' representatives into the Conseil supérieur de travail, the establishment of arbitration tribunals and inspectors of labour, and the creation of a labour section inside his Ministry of Commerce to tackle the problem of social insurance.

The introduction of trade union representatives on the Supreme Labour Council, the organisation of local labour councils, and instructions to factory inspectors to put themselves in communication with the councils of the trade unions were valuable concessions to labour. He further secured the rigorous application of earlier laws devised for the protection of the working class. His name was especially associated with a project for the establishment of old age pensions, which became law in 1905. In 1898, he became editor of La Lanterne.

Millerand twice served as minister of war, first from 1912 to 1913 and again, during the early stages of World War I, from 1914 to 1915.

=== Prime minister ===
Millerand continued to move to the right, being appointed prime minister by the conservative president, Paul Deschanel. During his time as prime minister, a decree of February 1920 introduced the eight-hour day for seamen.

=== Presidency and later years ===
When Deschanel had to resign later in 1920 due to his mental disorder, Millerand emerged as a compromise candidate for President between the Bloc National and the remnants of the Bloc des gauches. Millerand appointed Georges Leygues, a politician with a long career of ministerial office, as Prime Minister and attempted to strengthen the executive powers of the presidency. This move was resisted in the Chamber of Deputies and the French Senate, and Millerand was forced to appoint a stronger figure, Aristide Briand. Briand's appointment was welcomed by both left and right, although the Socialists and the left wing of the Radical Party did not join his government.

However, Millerand dismissed Briand after just a year, and appointed the conservative republican Raymond Poincaré.

Millerand was accused of favouring conservatives in spite of the traditional neutrality of French presidents and the composition of the legislature. On 14 July 1922, Millerand escaped an assassination attempt by Gustave Bouvet, a young French anarchist. Two years later, on 11 June 1924, Millerand resigned in the face of growing conflict between the elected legislature and the office of the president, following the victory of the Cartel des Gauches. Gaston Doumergue, who was the president of the Senate at the time, was chosen on 13 June to replace Millerand.

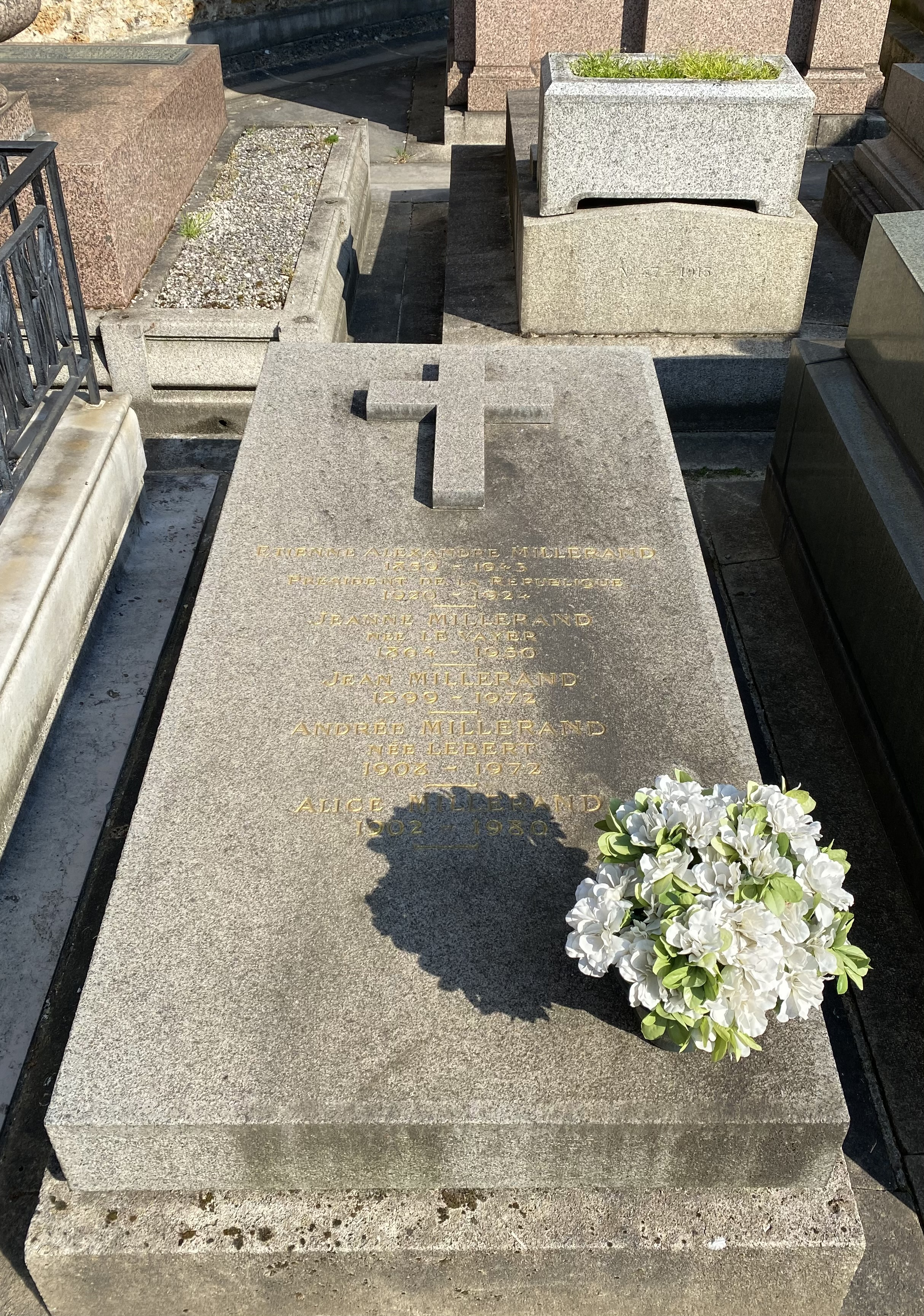
Millerand's grave in the Passy Cemetery.

Millerand died in 1943 at Versailles, and was interred in the Passy Cemetery. He was awarded Serbian Order of Karađorđe's Star.

== Millerand's Ministry, 20 January 1920 – 24 September 1920 ==
- Alexandre Millerand - President of the Council and Minister of Foreign Affairs
- André Joseph Lefèvre - Minister of War
- Théodore Steeg - Minister of the Interior
- Frédéric François-Marsal - Minister of Finance
- Paul Jourdain - Minister of Labour
- Gustave L'Hopiteau - Minister of Justice
- Adolphe Landry - Minister of Marine
- André Honnorat - Minister of Public Instruction and Fine Arts
- André Maginot - Minister of War Pensions, Grants, and Allowances
- Joseph Ricard - Minister of Agriculture
- Albert Sarraut - Minister of Colonies
- Yves Le Trocquer - Minister of Public Works
- Auguste Isaac - Minister of Commerce and Industry
- Émile Ogier - Minister of Liberated Regions

== Honours and awards ==
- Grand-Croix of the Order of Legion of Honour
- Honour medal of railroads
- Order of the White Eagle (Poland)
- Order of Charles III

== Gallery ==
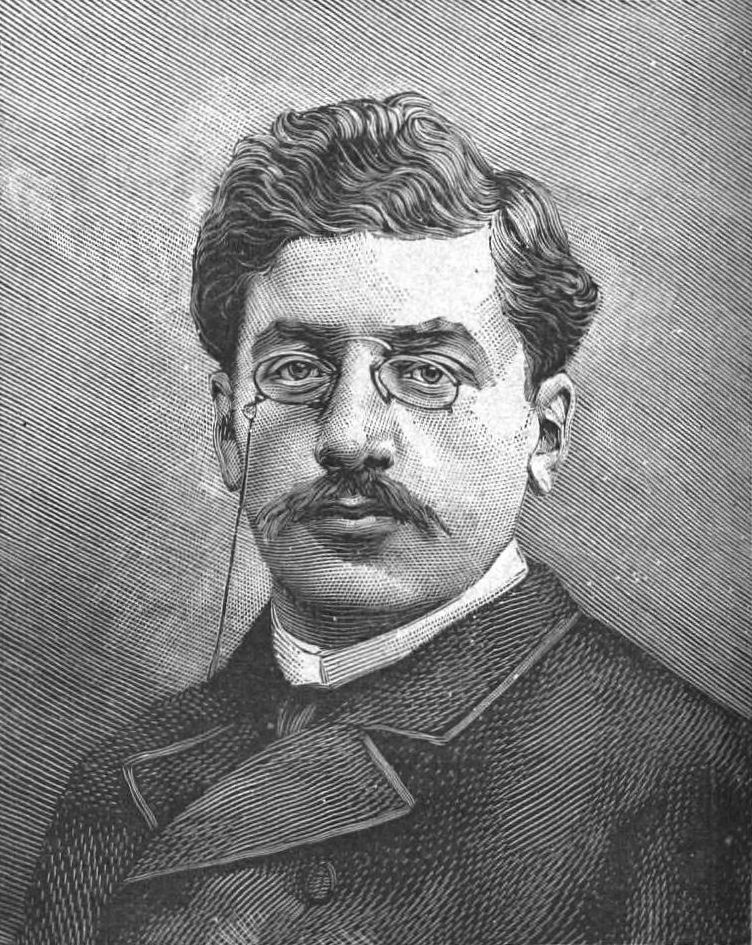
Young Alexandre Millerand in 1893.

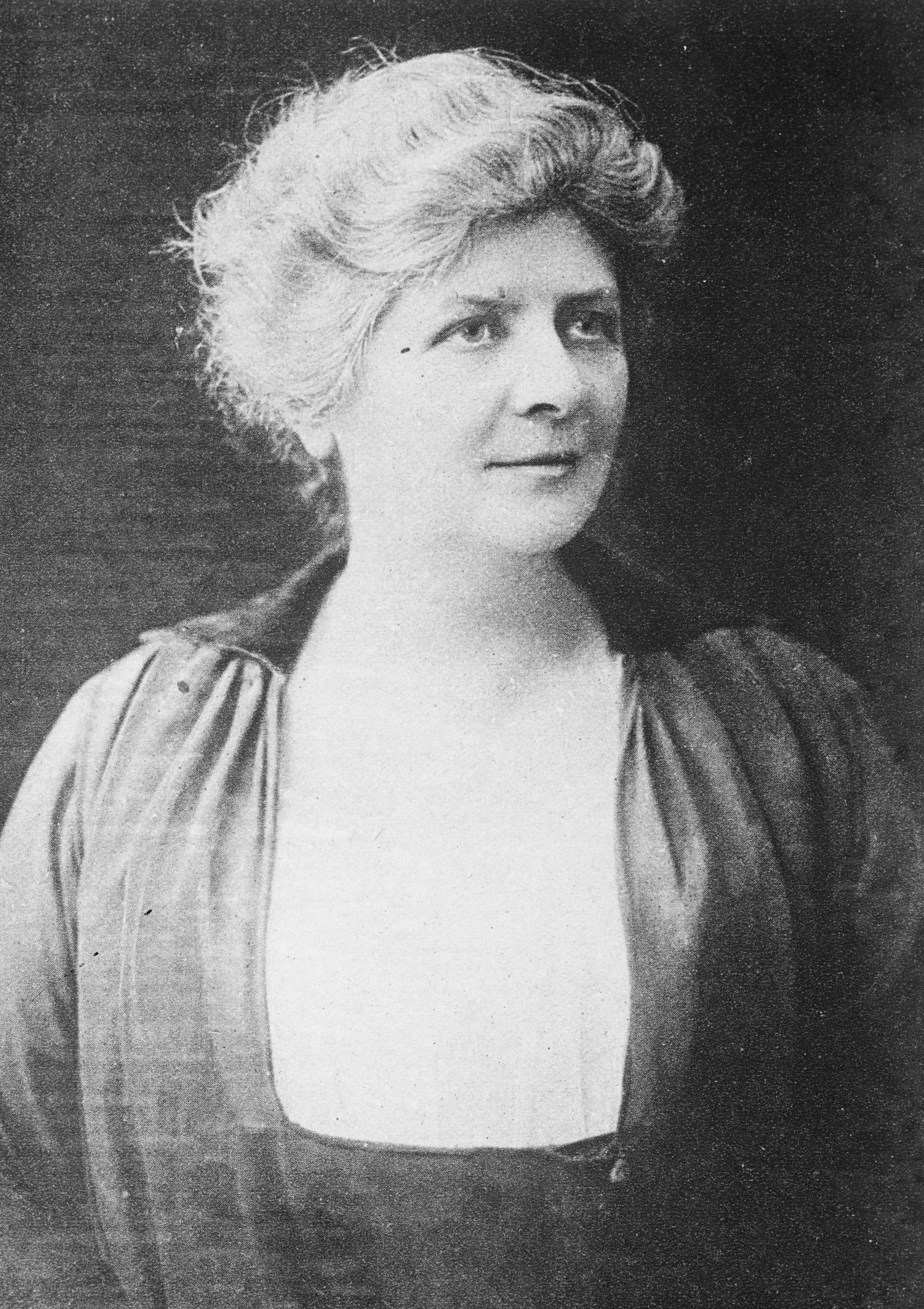
Jeanne Millerand, née Jeanne Levayer.

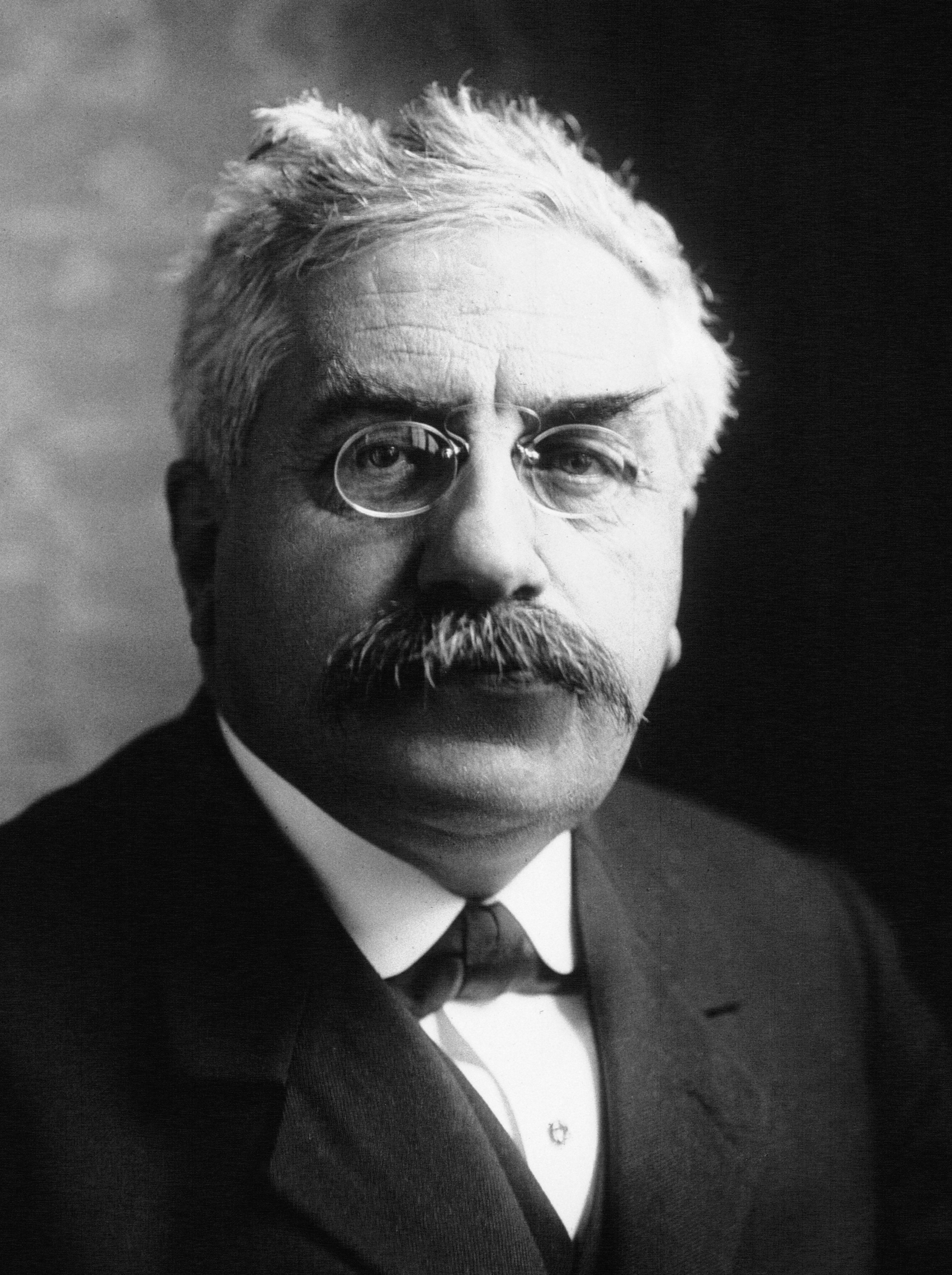
Alexandre Millerand as Minister of War, 1914.

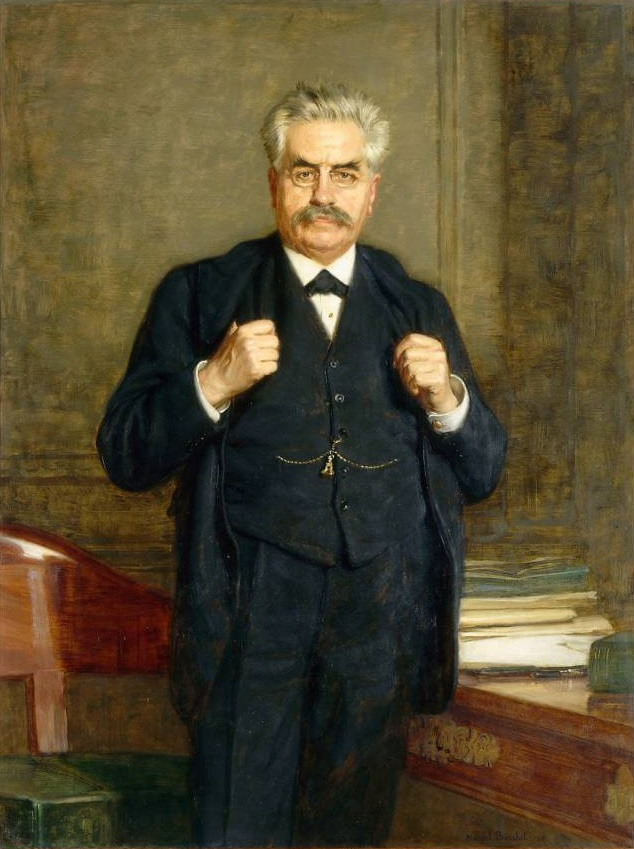
Portrait of Alexandre Millerand, 1921
(by Marcel Baschet).

Presidential standard of Alexandre Millerand.

== See also ==
- Interwar France
- San Remo conference

== Notes ==
Political offices
Preceded by Paul Delombre	Minister of Commerce, Industry, Posts and Telegraphs; 1899–1902	Succeeded by Georges Trouillot
Preceded by Louis Barthou	Minister of Public Works, Posts and Telegraphs; 1909–1910	Succeeded by Louis Puech
Preceded by Adolphe Messimy	Minister of War; 1912–1913	Succeeded by Albert Lebrun
Preceded by Adolphe Messimy	Minister of War; 1914–1915	Succeeded by Joseph Galliéni
Preceded by Georges Clemenceau	Prime Minister of France; 1920	Succeeded by Georges Leygues
Preceded by Stéphen Pichon	Minister of Foreign Affairs; 1920	Succeeded by Georges Leygues
Preceded by Paul Deschanel	President of France; 1920–1924	Succeeded by Gaston Doumergue
Regnal titles
Preceded by Paul Deschanel	Co-Prince of Andorra; 1920–1924; Served alongside: Justí Guitart i Vilardebó	Succeeded by Gaston Doumergue
