= Louis Loucheur =

French politician (1872–1931)

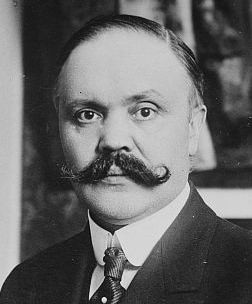
Louis Loucheur

Louis Loucheur (12 August 1872 in Roubaix, Nord – 22 November 1931 in Paris) was a French politician in the Third Republic, at first a member of the conservative Republican Federation, then of the Democratic Republican Alliance and of the Independent Radicals.

Harold Nicolson, in "Curzon The Last Phase 1919-1921," wrote, in his biographical footnote on Loucheur, "one of the most reasonable and intelligent of French post-war experts; not a politician."

== Life ==
Coming from a background in the arms industry, Loucheur became Minister of Armaments in September 1917. He was administrator of Tréfileries et Laminoirs du Havre (TLH) when he was appointed Minister of Armaments. He replaced Albert Thomas and served as armaments minister until 26 November, 1918 when he became Minister of Industrial Re-construction where he remained until 20 January, 1920.

He was the principal economic advisor for Georges Clemenceau at the 1919 Paris Peace Conference. The product of this conference was the controversial Treaty of Versailles.

He was Minister of Liberated Regions from 16 January 1921 to 15 January 1922 in the 7th cabinet of Aristide Briand.

Loucheur was briefly Minister of Commerce, Industry, Posts, and Telegraphs under Raymond Poincaré in 1924.

He also served as Minister of Finance in Briand's seventh Government during 1925 and 1926.

In Édouard Herriot's Second Ministry Loucheur served as Minister of Commerce and Industry and from June 1928 to February 1930. He succeeded Maurice Bokanowski, who had died in an air accident. He then served again under Poincaré as Minister of Labour, Hygiene, Welfare Work, and Social Security Provisions.

== Bibliography ==
- Carls, Stephen (1993). Louis Loucheur and the Shaping of Modern France 1916-1931. Louisiana State University Press.
