= Radio in France =

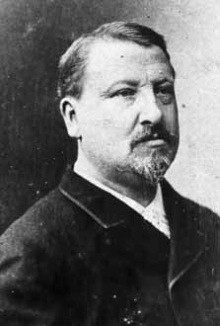
Ducretet was the first person to send radio transmissions in France.

French radio stations are licensed and regulated by the CSA, and public radio services are provided by Radio France.

== History ==
The history of radio in France began in 1897 when Eugène Adrien Ducretet successfully transmitted radio messages between two Paris landmarks. However, radio only became fully developed during the interwar period, when the Daladier government brought broadcasting under their centralized control in 1938.

During the First World War, General Gustave-Auguste Ferrié began using the Eiffel Tower for radio transmissions. Radiotechnique, founded in 1919 as a holding company for Émile Girardeau's Société française radio-électrique, began manufacturing radio sets in 1921. Radio Normandie (originally Radio Fécamp), created by Fernand Le Grand, was licensed by the French government in 1926. In 1931, Leonard Plugge, a British politician, founded the "International Broadcasting Company" and persuaded Le Grand to start broadcasting programs in English.

=== Post-War ===
After World War II, radio in France became a public monopoly.

"Peripheral radio" were radio stations transmitting from outside France and therefore operating outside of the public monopoly. These included Europe 1, Sud Radio, Radio Monte Carlo and Radio Luxembourg.

Radio Luxembourg was broadcasting on Long Wave from Luxembourg before WW2. In 1956, from Germany Sarre another "peripheral" station named Europe 1 came on the air on Long Wave, on 183 kHz. Germany's Sarre mainly was aimed at the northern half of France. In 1970 and onwards, "peripherals" would benefit from almost-national coverage due to 2000 kW transmitters. At that time, Radio Monte Carlo (RMC) started to broadcast on Long Wave at 216 kHz. From 1976, the transmitter was allowed to broadcast from France (Roumoules north of Marseille), with 1400 kW being heard in the southern half of France. Meanwhile, Sud Radio on 819 kHz was broadcasting from Andorra for the southwest with 900 kW.

In 1981, as promised by newly elected François Mitterrand, independent stations were allowed, at first with very little power and on FM only. Since 1981, the number of stations in France (public and private) has reached more than 1700. The AM band is not used in France (though it was viral before WW2).

Longwave has been abandoned by Radio France in 2018, Europe 1 in 2019, and RMC in 2020.. Radio Luxembourg abandoned the LW on 1 January 2023. Sud Radio has left AM for FM, where all stations now are. DAB+ is currently being developed to accommodate more programs.

== See also ==
- List of radio stations in France
- Gascony Show
