= Compagnie générale de la télégraphie sans fil =

French technology company

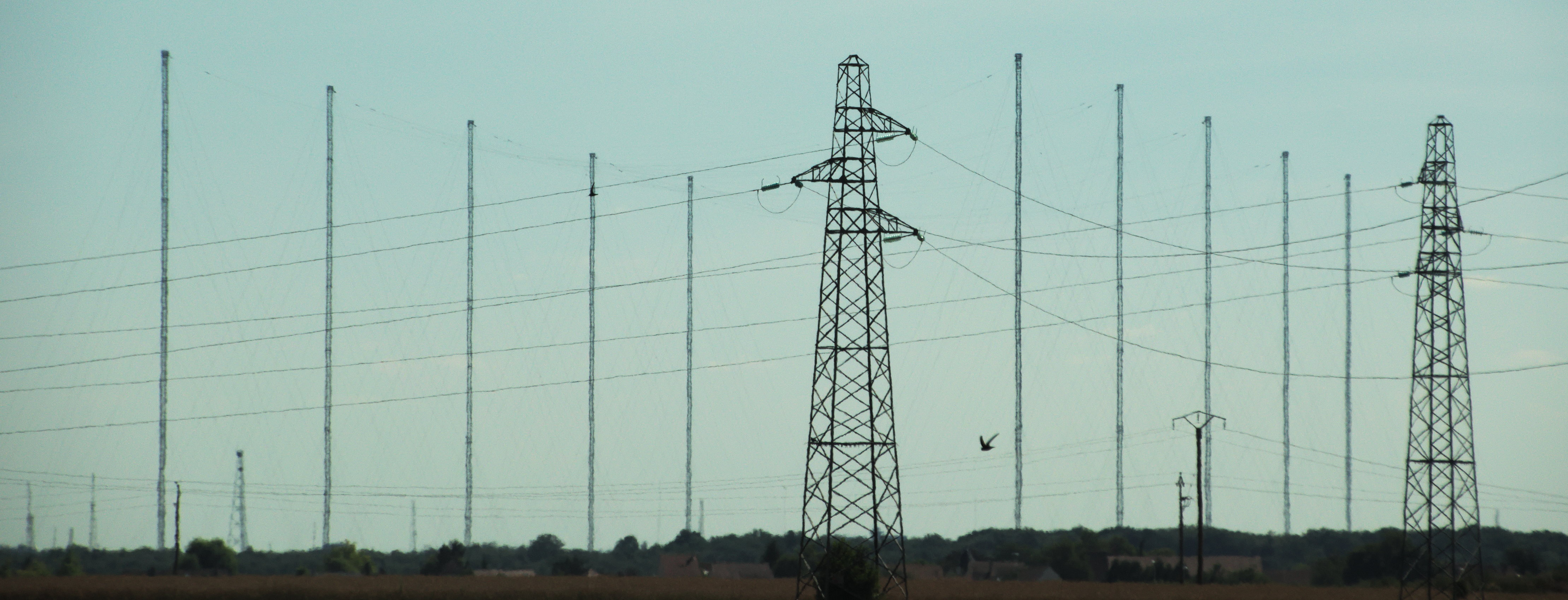
- Sainte-Assise transmitter
- Industry: Electronics
- Founded: 1919
- Founder: Émile Girardeau
- Defunct: 1968
- Fate: merged
- Successor: Thomson-CSF
- Headquarters: Paris, France

The Compagnie générale de la télégraphie sans fil (CSF: General Wireless Telegraphy Company) was a French company founded in 1918 during a reorganization and expansion of the Société française radio-électrique (SFR), which became a subsidiary. The company developed technology for radio-telegraphy, radio program transmission, radar, television and other applications. It provided broadcasting and telegraphy services, and sold its equipment throughout the French colonial empire and in many other parts of the world. In 1968 CSF merged with the Thomson-Brandt to form Thomson-CSF.

== Background ==
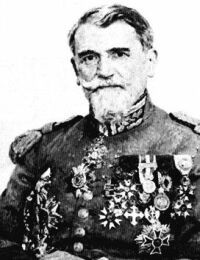
Gustave Ferrié, pioneer of French radio technology

From the mid-19th century the world was connected with an increasingly dense network of telegraph wires and submarine cables. In 1887 Heinrich Hertz of Germany conclusively proved the existence of electromagnetic waves. Alexander Stepanovich Popov of Russia developed antennas to transmit and receive radio waves. Scientists such as Édouard Branly and Nikola Tesla also contributed to development of the concepts. In 1895 Guglielmo Marconi, a student at the University of Bologna, invented wireless telegraphy. In 1897 he founded the Wireless Telegraph & Signal Company in England. Its subsidiary the Marconi Wireless Telegraph Company of America was formed in the US in 1899. (Note: On 5 September 1919 the British Marconi Company agreed to sell its American interests to General Electric. Later this would become RCA (Radio Corporation of America).) The Telefunken company was created in Germany in 1903 as a joint venture of Siemens and AEG.

In France the engineer captain Gustave-Auguste Ferrié (1868–1932) gathered a team to work on wireless telegraphy for the military. Ferrié demonstrated the value of radio telegraphy to the government during the volcanic eruption of the Mount Pelée in Martinique, and showed the value of placing antennas at the summit of the Eiffel Tower. In 1908 the young polytechnic Émile Girardeau joined Ferrié's team. Girardeau and the scientist Joseph Bethenod decided to found a French company to meet military and civilian radio communication needs.

== Société Française Radio-Electrique (1910–19) ==
The Société Française Radio-Electrique (SFR) was launched on 3 April 1910. Paul Brenot was an important contributor to development of the SFR. Bethenod's new techniques were used in the first radiotelegraph link in the tropics, between Brazzaville and Loango. This led to orders for SFR equipment from Belgium, Mexico, Turkey, Bulgaria, Serbia, Italy, Russia and China. Between 1910 and 1914 the SFR developed musical frequency resonance alternators, established stations in the Belgian Congo and Russia, developed field transmitters that could be carried by car or mule, which were tested in the 1912–13 Balkan Wars, and installed the first transmitters on airships, airplanes, warships, fishing boats and passenger boats.

World War I (1914–18) stimulated radio research. New stations were ordered by Serbia and Romania. The French Navy built a large center at Basse-Lande (Brains, Loire-Atlantique), with two arc transmitters and one spark transmitter. SFR delivered 65 fixed stations with over 5 kW power, 18,000 aircraft stations, 300 stations on vessels and 300 mobile stations on vehicles. A new machine providing continuous waves using the Bethenod process was installed at the Lyon la Doua station.

== Formation (1918–19) ==
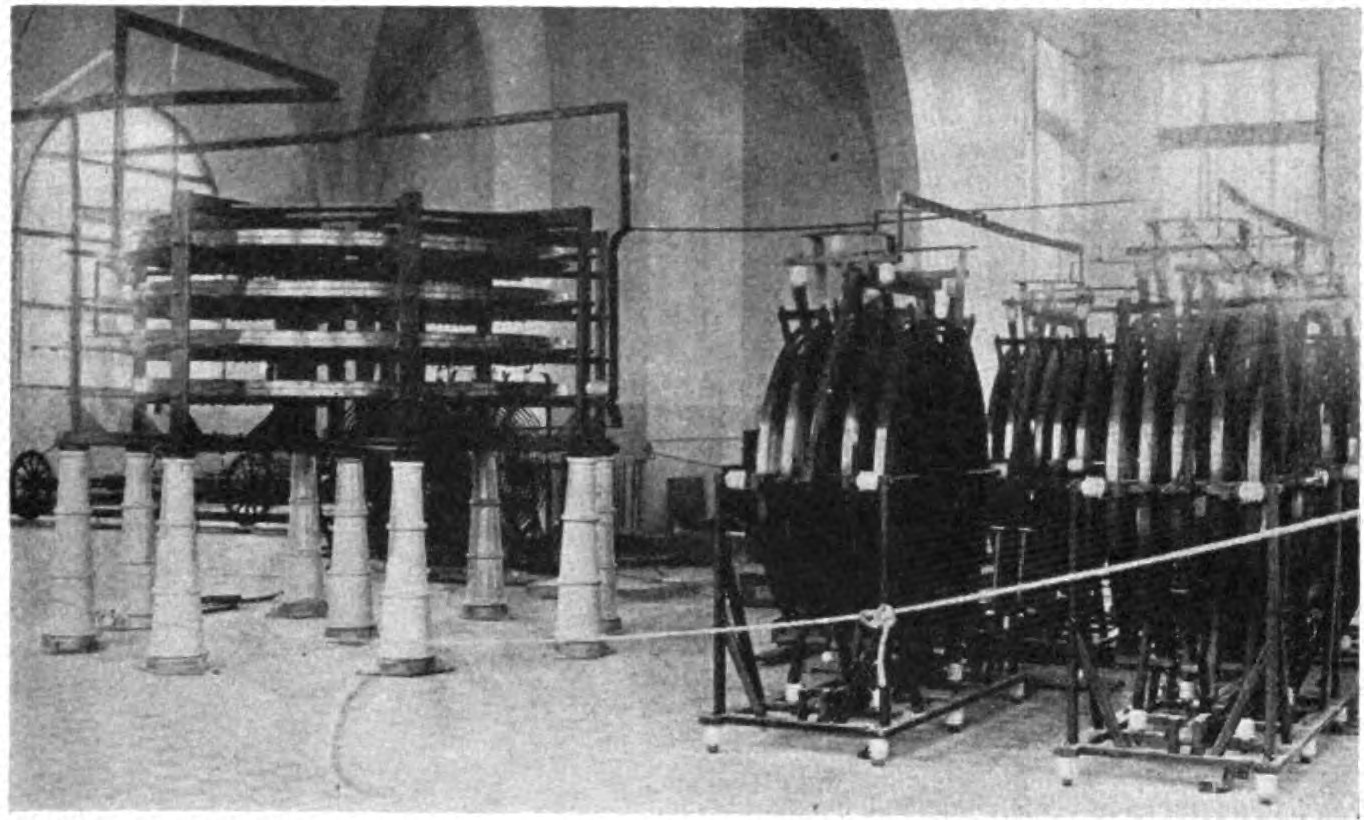
Huge spiral "pancake" inductors at Sainte Assise in 1922

Creation of the Compagnie générale de la télégraphie sans fil (CSF) in 1918 was due to the success of the SFR and the initiative of investors led by the Banque de Paris et des Pays-Bas (BPPB) and including the Compagnie Française des Câbles Télégraphiques (CFCT), which operated transatlantic telegraph lines. One of the benefits to the bank was that it allowed it to make use of the rights it had to German assets seized by the Allies. Émile Girardeau headed the CSF, which was a holding company that included the SFR for radio telegraphy and had other subsidiaries for management of radio telegram traffic, maritime radio and radio broadcasting. In 1919 the SFR created a factory in Levallois-Perret in the northwest of Paris. Paul Brenot left the army to become technical director of the SFR.

There were strong financial relations between BPPB and the CSF holding company, but BPPB did not have much involvement with the subsidiaries, for which the CSF played the role of banker. The CSF revenues came from royalties paid by the subsidiaries for the exploitation of patents held by the parent company. Dividends remained low. The CSF managed a general research laboratory at the central level, and held all the patents in the group.

== Inter-war period (1919–39) ==
The CSF gave attractive salaries and facilities to young physicists who could not obtain academic positions. These included Yves Rocard (1903-1992), who joined Radiotechnique in 1928 and Maurice Ponte (1902-1983), who joined in 1929. Both Rocard and Ponte were graduates of the École Normale Supérieure in Paris. Yves Rocard later contributed to developing France's atomic bomb. Ponte was placed in charge of the SFR vacuum tubes department and of the general research laboratory, and was given a free hand in hiring physicists to assist in electronics and electromagnetic radiation research.

In 1925 the CSF group had about 1,600 employees. By 1935 it had grown to 4,900 employees, including the workforce of Radiotechnique, which at that time was jointly owned with Philips. In 1935 the state required that its most important suppliers have facilities south of the Loire, and the SFR moved to Cholet, Maine-et-Loire. The Cholet plant, which had been a subcontracting plant to the main Levallois factory, became an autonomous facility with the full range of administrative, technical and testing services. It grew from 25 workers in 1937 to 1,250 in 1957, with an area of 22,000 square metres (240,000 sq ft).

During the inter-war period the German Telefunken, the British Marconi, the American RCA and the French CSF operated as a cartel, avoiding competition. During meetings of the International Broadcasting Union ostensibly concerned with regulating use of radio frequencies the company leaders made agreements for cross-licensing of patents and for carving up the market. The CSF's main markets were France, the French colonial empire, Serbia, Argentina and Chile. The CSF also had branches in the Middle East, China Japan and the USSR.

=== Radio transmission services ===
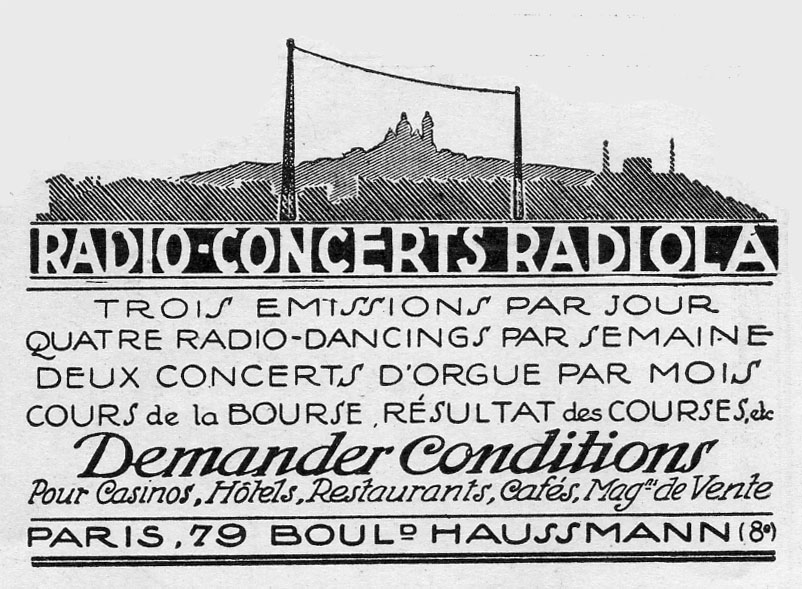
1924 Radiola advertisement

To help promote radio technology, on 19 October 1920 the Secretary of State for Posts and Telegraphs granted the CSF the concession to build and operate all international radio links from France. One of the company's early achievements was construction of the Sainte-Assise long-wave transmission station, near Melun, through its subsidiary Radio-France. Eight 250 metres (820 ft) towers supported two antennas fed by four 500KW alternators. The station entered operation in 1922. Short wave transmissions, reflected by the ionosphere, are generally a better solution for intercontinental transmissions but are sensitive to weather and variations in the ionosphere. The huge Sainte-Assise installation remained useful for emergencies. In Sainte Assise the Radio-France subsidiary began broadcasting to Europe, America and the Far East in 1921 under a 30-year state concession signed in 1920. The Société Radio-Orient was a subsidiary that provided a similar service in the Near East.

The SFR, based in Levallois-Perret, began experimental broadcasts in June 1922. On 31 October 1922 it was authorized to broadcast regular programs, with the proviso that advertising was not allowed. The first broadcast of the Radiola station from Levallois was made in early November 1922. Radiola was the first French private radio broadcasting station. It was renamed Radio-Paris in 1924. Additional radio broadcast stations were created in Clichy, Toulouse, Algiers, Ankara, Tunis, Rennes, Lille and Strasbourg. In 1933 Radiola was sold to the state due to political pressure.

=== Radio equipment ===
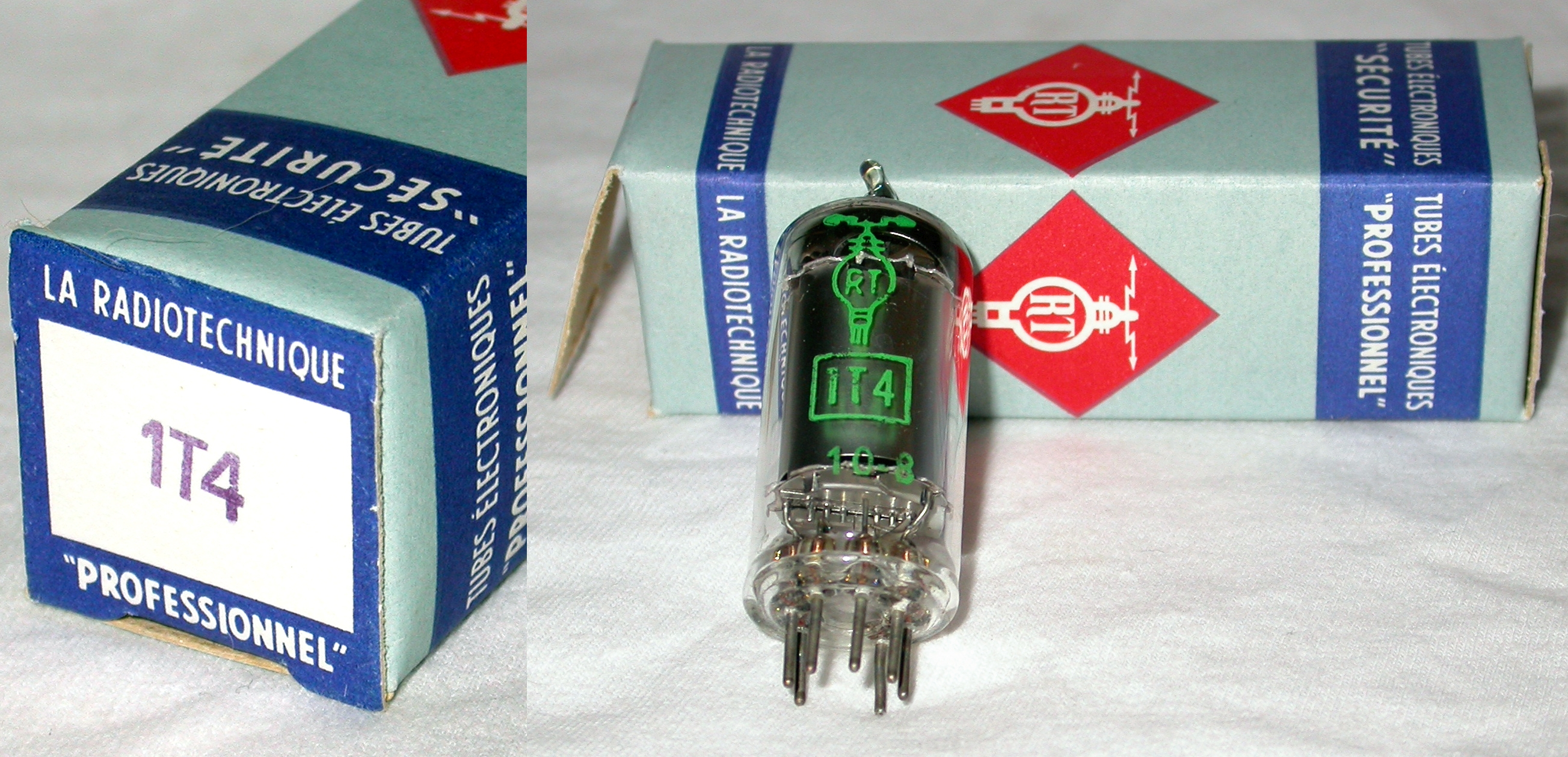
Vacuum tube 1T4 manufactured by La Radiotechnique

CSF manufactured radio reception and transmission equipment for both amateurs and professionals. The Radio Maritime subsidiary provided equipment to merchant ships. The Radiotechnique subsidiary was formed in 1919 to research and develop electronic transmission and reception tubes at its Suresnes plant. The "Radiola" trademark was used for radio receivers produced by Radiotechnique as well as for the radio station.

Although France was not immediately affected by the Great Depression, CSF felt the effect in 1929 since radio transmission was mainly the result of global commercial activity. In 1929 it merged amateur equipment manufacturing into its Radiotechnique subsidiary and made an agreement with Philips of the Netherlands under which CSF would drop its amateur equipment line and Philips would not compete on professional equipment. Philips bought half the shares of Radiotechnique, but in practice fully controlled the subsidiary. The market for amateur receiving stations exploded in 1930. CSF used the sale of shares and its stake in Radiotechnique to strengthen its position in the professional sector. Development and manufacture of professional electronic tubes was transferred from Suresnes to the SFR plant at Levallois.

In late 1937, Maurice Elie at SFR developed a means of pulse-modulating transmitter tubes. This led to a new 16 cm system with a peak power near 500W and a pulse width of 6μs. French and U.S. patents were filed in December 1939.

=== Radar ===
Rocard and Ponte both moved to Levallois after the spin-off of Radiotechnique. Ponte was appointed director of the "lampes" department, the name used for electronic tubes at the time, but continued to be directly involved in research, particularly into magnetrons to generate ultra-short waves for obstacle detection. This was an early form of Radar, although it was used to detect boats and icebergs rather than enemy aircraft. In the 1920s French physicists Camille Gutton and Émile Pierret had experimented with 16 cm wavelengths. After researching the cavity magnetron system in the short wave domain at 16 cm and 80 cm, a CSF team led by Maurice Ponte and Henri Gutton, son of Camille Gutton, filed a patent for a radar detection system in 1934. In 1934–35 CSF equipped the SS Oregon and SS Normandie with anti-iceberg collision detectors with a range of about 10 kilometres (6.2 mi).

=== Film and television ===
The PTT asked CSF to study television, and CSF launched the Radio-cinéma subsidiary for this purpose, with the first objective being to develop talking movie projectors for large cinemas. Radio-cinéma was founded as a subsidiary of CSF on 21 June 1929, in the year that talking movies first appeared. The first workshops were in the 20th arrondissement of Paris. The subsidiary designed and made movie projectors for big cinema screening rooms. CSF did not get involved in television cameras and receivers, but from 1935 was the PTT's main contact for development of TV transmitters.

== World War II (1939–45) ==
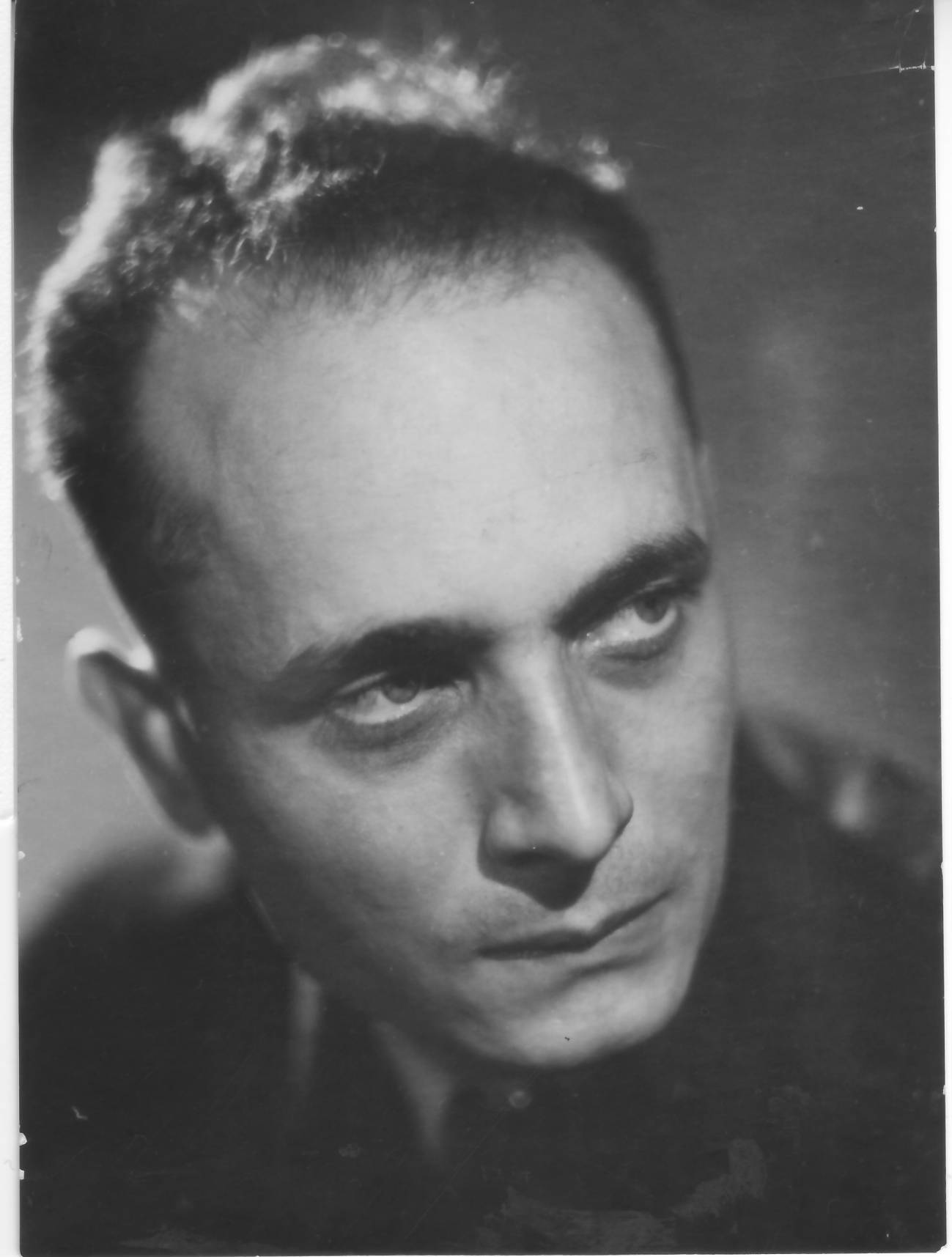
Pierre Grivet

In 1939 the company had slightly more than 4,000 employees, still considerably less than Telefunken, Marconi, RCA and Philips of the Netherlands. In the early months of the war the Levallois laboratories made important advances in the development of the cavity magnetron, which paved the way for centimeter radar that will be widely used by the Allies from 1943 to equip hunters and bombers. On 8 May 1940 Maurice Ponte went to London in person to present the CSF magnetron to the British, who would combine the advantages of the SFR prototype and their own prototype.

After the German occupation the Levallois and Cholet plants were placed under the supervision of Telefunken. The SIF plant in Malakoff was placed under the supervision of Siemens & Halske, and the Radiotechnique plant in Suresnes under that of Philips Electro Special, a German subsidiary of Philips in Berlin. During the war Paul Brenot had the title of technical director of the SFR, but was the right-hand man of Émile Girardeau. Under the German occupation there were very friendly relations between the CSF and Telefunken, for which Brenot was later criticized. In his defense, Brenot said that Telefunken's permanent representative in Paris, Doctor Schultz, was a former composer and virtuoso pianist with whom he had formed cordial relations before the war, and who was liberal, anti-militaristic and anti-Nazi.

The SFR set up a study center in the free zone in Lyon. The Personnel Department was instructed to facilitate the transfer of all Jewish employees who wish to move there. A small factory was also set up in Algiers. Controlled by the occupants as a Telefunken production center, SFR produced mainly for the German army. 65% of its turnover was devoted to German armaments from 1940 to 1944, reaching 86% in 1943. The number of employees was 2,600 in February 1940, dropped to 1,000 in August 1940 but then rose to more than 4,000 by 1943. Most of the output was equipment designed by Telefunken. Several capital increases were arranged, supported by BPPB.

Pierre Grivet, a graduate of the École Normale Supérieure, was appointed to the Lavallois-Perret research laboratory during World War II and participated in a project to develop a 60kV oscilloscope, needed for television research. Grivet acquired expertise in electron optics, and obtained a government order for an electrostatic electron microscope during the period of German occupation.

== Post-war period (1945–68) ==
In the early 1950s Robert R. Warnecke was director of microwave research at the CSF in Paris.

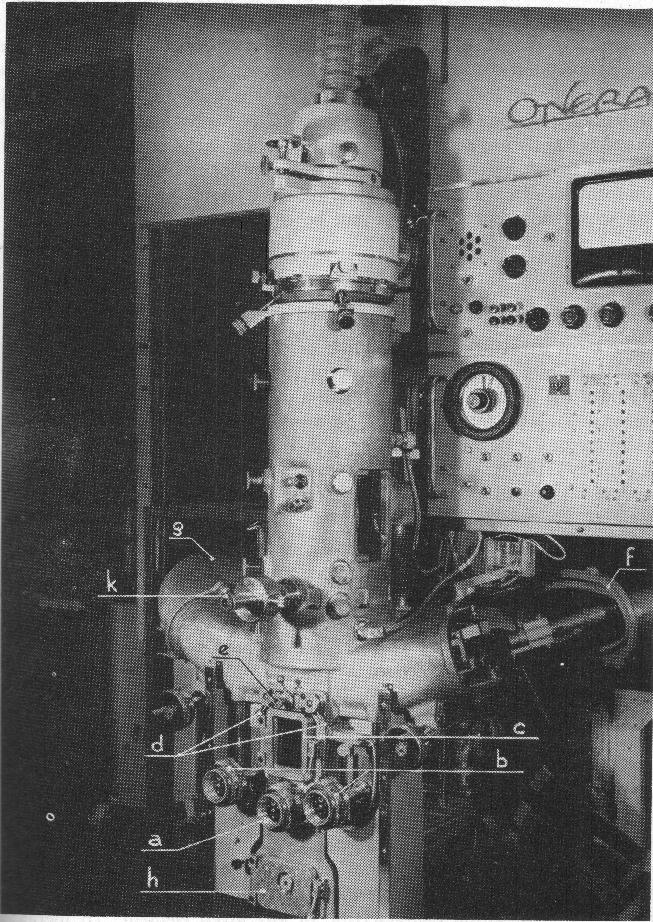
Castaing Microprobe, Model MS85, Cameca 1958

After World War II Radio-cinéma moved to Courbevoie, near to the other factories in Levallois. The project to develop the Spectro-Lecteur spectrum analysis device was launched at Radio-Cinema in 1947 in response to a request from the metallurgical company Pechiney. Early in the 1950s Radio-Cinema acquired the company of André Charlin, an engineer known for his expertise in talking movies, loudspeakers and stereophonics. In 1954 Radio-Cinema became the Compagnie des Applications Mécaniques et Electroniques au Cinéma et à l'Atomistique (CAMECA). The company retained its core business but diversified into precision engineering, making scientific instrumentation and aerospace radars. In 1955 CAMECA was structured with three departments, one to produce Radio-Cinema and Charlin film projectors, one undertaking mechanical production for other CSF subsidiaries, and the third working on the Spectro-Lecteur. CAMECA went on to develop ion and electron microprobes.

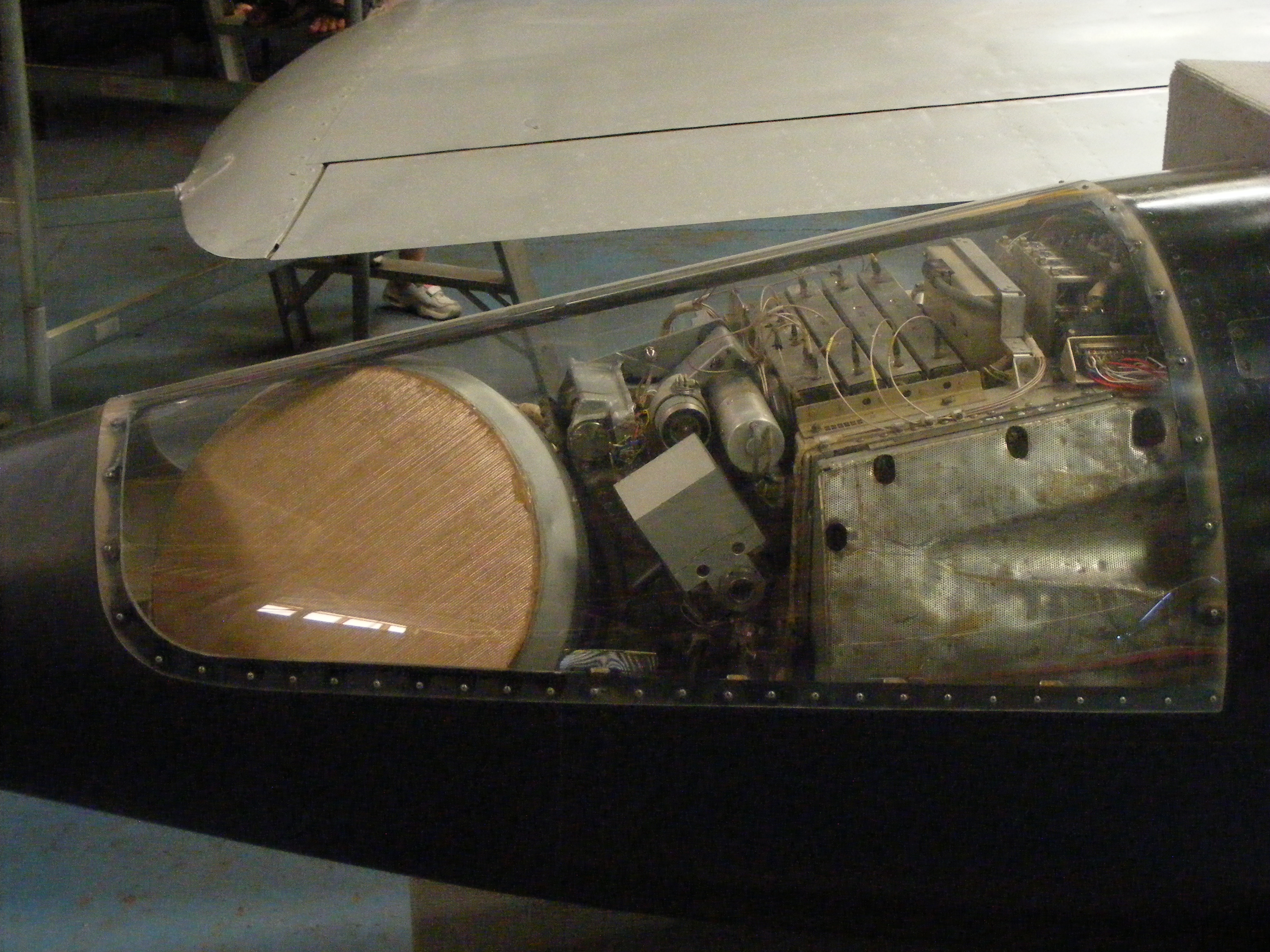
Dassault Mirage Cyrano 11 Radar

In 1957 the CSF absorbed the SFR. In 1968 Thomson-Brandt and CSF were merged to form the large Thomson-CSF group. Thomson-CSF was nationalized in 1982 and privatized in 1997.

== Sources ==
- "A Marconi Wireless Telegraph Company for America", Electrical World and Engineer: 13 v, 2 December 1899
- Archer, Gleason Leonard (1938), History of radio to 1926, New York: The American historical society
- Bertin?, Henri (20 July 1934), Nouveau syst-eme de repe-rage d'obstacles et ses applications, archived from the original on 16 January 2009
- bricedenis (22 March 2008), La TSF (Télégraphie Sans Fil) à Brains (in French)
- Blanchard, Yves (2004), Le Radar, 1904-2004 – Histoire d'un siècle d'innovations techniques et opérationnelles (in French), éditions Ellipses, ISBN 2729818022
- Chambost, Emmanuel de (2011), "A History of CAMECA (1954-2009)", in Peter W. Hawkes (ed.), Advances in Imaging and Electron Physics, Academic Press, ISBN 978-0-12-385985-3
- Chambost, Emmanuel de (2012), La radioélectricité en France sous l'Occupation, Historiques (in French), l'Harmattan, archived from the original on 2017-08-22
- Delacroix, Laurent; Piernas, Gersende (2016), Société française radio-électrique (SFR - Thomson) (PDF) (in French), Roubaix: Archives nationales du monde du travail
- Dow, W. G. (November 1954), Report on Visits to European Electron Tube Laboratories, 1953, University of Michigan
- Elie, Maurice; Gutton, Henri; Hugon, Jacques Jean; Ponte, Maurice (30 December 1939), System for Object Detection and Distance Measurement
- Fagot, Jacques; Delasalle, André (1979), "La CSF-SFR", Historique Thomson, le groupe de 1893 à 1977 (internal history) (in French), Paris: Thomson
- Ginoux, Jean-Marc (2017-05-26), History of Nonlinear Oscillations Theory in France (1880–1940), Springer International Publishing, ISBN 978-3-319-55239-2
- Gueit, Lydiane (2001), "Un exemple du partenariat banque/ industrie – Paribas et la CSF (1918-1968)", Histoire, Économie et Société (in French), 20 (1): 87–104, doi:10.3406/hes.2001.2255
- "Histoire de Radiola 1922", 100 ans de radio (in French)
- Lurton, Thibaut (1 April 2010), Modélisation et simulation de l'interaction entre onde électromagnétique et surfaces de mer (thesis) (in French), École Nationale Supérieure des Télécommunications de Bretagne
