= Paul Brenot =

French radio engineer, industrialist, corporatist (1880–1967)

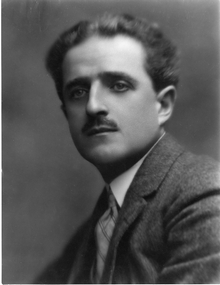
- Paul Brenot in 1927
- Born: 19 September 1880; Ruoms, Ardèche, France
- Died: 19 August 1967 (aged 86); Neuilly-sur-Seine, Hauts-de-Seine, France
- Occupations: Engineer, industrialist

Paul Brenot (19 September 1880 – 19 August 1967) was a French engineer and industrialist who was active in the development of radio in France. He was an advocate of free enterprise and had corporatist opinions. He was criticized after World War II for working too closely with the German occupiers of France.

== Life ==
=== Early years (1880–1918) ===
Paul Brenot was born in Ruoms, Ardèche, on 19 September 1880. He joined the École Polytechnique in 1899. He graduated as an engineer, and from 1904 to 1919 collaborated with General Gustave-Auguste Ferrié in creating military radiotelegraphy. He was an important contributor to development of the Société française radio-électrique (SFR: French Radio Telephone Company) created in 1910 by Joseph Bethenod and Émile Girardeau. In 1910 Brenot was a pioneer in mounting a SFR radio set on a Blériot XI airplane. He was head of the wireless telegraphy (TSF: télégraphie sans fil) service in the Ministry of Colonies from 1911 to 1919. During World War I (1914–18) Captain Paul Brenot headed the second group of the Military Telegraphic Service. Members of the group included Henri Abraham, Maurice de Broglie, Paul Laüt and Lucien Lévy.

=== Inter-war period (1918–39) ===
The Compagnie générale de la télégraphie sans fil (CSF) was created in 1919. That year the SFR created a factory in Levallois-Perret in the northwest of Paris. Brenot left the army to become technical director of the SFR. In 1924 Brenot and his first wife bought the Hôtel de Rieux, which had become the Hôtel Amelot de Bisseuil in the 17th century. In 1938 he published a work on the building called Un vieil Hôtel du Marais. As director of the SFR, Brenot was a delegate to the International Wireless Conference in Washington in 1927. Brenot, as vice-president of the Syndicat Professionel des Industries Radioélectriques, became a member of the lobbying group Radio-Agricole Française (RAF), founded in 1927 by the former minister of agriculture Joseph H. Ricard. The RAF promoted the value of radio in allowing rural families to stay in touch with the world.

In the inter-war years the ability to pick up foreign radio signals depended on many factors, including weather, time of day, signal frequency and strength and the listener's equipment and location. Brenot noted in La Nature in 1932 that one should distinguish between listening to radio stations and merely hearing them. Brenot was an advocate of privatized radio stations along the American model, where most European nations supported nationalization. Brenot's position was attacked by the radio journalist Paul Campargue, who called it the "American radio bluff" and pointed out that almost all radio frequencies, transmitter and programs were controlled by a small number of powerful corporations. From 1934 Brenot was president of the Chambre Syndicale des Industries Radioélectriques (CSIR), which brought together 35 of the most important companies in the radio industry.

In June 1936, Brenot undertook to form a group of employers that would support social policy as an alternative to the Confédération générale du patronat français (CGPF). This was soon abandoned in favor of reforming the CGPF from within, but there was resistance by the CGPF. On 9 July 1936, Brenot proposed to the Parisian Metallurgy Industry Syndicate and the General Electrical Construction Syndicate to form an inter-syndicate committee of active employers for the purpose of social action propaganda. After a difficult summer the CGPF began internal reforms, and Brenot agree to participate. Colonel Paul Brenot was the driving force in persuading the CGPF to form a social committee. He made sure it did not include Alexandre Lambert-Ribot, secretary of the Comité des forges and representative of the heavy industry oligarchy.

After their relationship settled down, Brenot's Comité de prévoyance et d'action sociale (CPAS) worked closely with the CGPF. The CPAS presented itself as an organization of small and medium-sized enterprises, "responsible for creating the employers' union and the collaboration of classes". The CPAS launched a vigorous campaign against the 40-hour work week, the Confédération générale du travail (CGT) and the communists. Brenot was supported by Claude-Joseph Gignoux and Louis Renault. Louis Germain-Martin, a radical right wing former minister of Finance with corporatist leanings, was elected president of the CPAS on 27 January 1937.

=== World War II and later (1939–67) ===
During World War II (1939–45) Brenot had the title of technical director of the SFR, but was the right-hand man of the owner, Émile Girardeau. Under the German occupation there were very friendly relations between the CSF and the German Telefunken company, for which Brenot was later criticized. In his defense, Brenot said that Telefunken's permanent representative in Paris, Doctor Schultz, was a former composer and virtuoso pianist with whom he had formed cordial relations before the war, and who was liberal, anti-militaristic and anti-Nazi.

Paul Brenot died in 1967.

== Publications ==
- Paul Brenot (July–September 1926), "L'Industrie de la radioélectricité, son importance, son évolution, ses besoins, son avenir", Bulletin, Paris: Société d'encouragement pour l'industrie nationale
- Paul Brenot (1926), Hôtel Amelot de Bisseuil
- Paul Brenot (1929), À la conquête des ondes, la T. S. F., preface by Gustave Auguste Ferrié, Paris: Plon
- Paul Brenot (1931), Discours ... au banquet donné à l'occasion du 8e Salon de la T. S. F.... 4 septembre 1931, Paris: Syndicat professionnel des industries radio-électrique
- Paul Brenot (1933), Discours à l'occasion du 10ème salon de la T. S. F. ..., Paris: Syndicat professionnel des Industries radio-électriques, impr. P. Sergent
- Pierre Hémardinquer (1937), Les Meilleurs Récepteurs de T.S.F., preface by Paul Brenot, Paris: Dunod
- Paul Brenot; Louis Germain-Martin, L'Unité d'action patronale, Paris: impr. de A. Tournon
- Paul Brenot; Louis Germain-Martin (1938), Deux ans d'activité du Comité de prévoyance et d'action sociales (quatre conférences), Paris: impr. V. Duperret
- Paul Brenot (1939), Un vieil hôtel du Marais, du XIVe au XXe siècle, Paris: Impr. André Tournon
- Pierre Hémardinquer (1939), Les Meilleurs appareils de T.S.F., preface by Paul Brenot, Paris: Dunod
- Paul Brenot (1945), Un professeur d'énergie : le général Ferrié (Discours), Paris: Impr. de André Tournon
- Paul Brenot (1949), Le Général Ferrié (Textes d'un éloge funèbre radiodiffusé le 16 février 1932...), Paris: P. Sergent
- Paul Brenot (1953), Les Mondes ultra-atomiques et le problème de la vie, Paris: impr. de A. Tournon
- Paul Brenot (1959), Le Siècle de la T.S.F., Paris: Éditions de Minuit (La Rochelle, Impr. de l'Ouest)
- Paul Brenot (1963), Législation applicable aux centrales thermiques, Lyon : impr. P. Morel et fils: Électricité de France. Groupe de production thermique Sud-Est
- Paul Brenot (1972), Mise à jour de la législation applicable aux centrales thermiques classiques et nucléaires, Lyon : impr. Morel: l'Électricité de France, Groupe régional de production thermique Sud-Est

== Sources ==
- Chambost, Emmanuel de (2012), La radioélectricité en France sous l'Occupation, Historiques (in French), l'Harmattan
- Dard, Olivier (1999), Jean Coutrot: de l'ingénieur au prophète (in French), Presses Univ. Franche-Comté, ISBN 978-2-913322-06-6
- Ginoux, Jean-Marc (2017-05-26), History of Nonlinear Oscillations Theory in France (1880–1940), Springer International Publishing, ISBN 978-3-319-55239-2
- Loviglio, Jason; Hilmes, Michele (2013-06-19), Radio's New Wave: Global Sound in the Digital Era, Routledge, ISBN 978-1-136-44631-3
- Mollier, Jean-Yves; George, Jocelyne (1994-10-19), La Plus longue des Républiques: 1870-1940, Fayard, ISBN 978-2-213-64813-2
- Paul Brenot (1880–1967) (in French), BnF: Bibliotheque nationale de France
- Paul Brenot (b. 1880), Smithsonian
- Scales, Rebecca (2016-02-24), Radio and the Politics of Sound in Interwar France, 1921-1939, Cambridge University Press, ISBN 978-1-107-10867-7
- Vinen, Richard (2002-08-08), The Politics of French Business 1936–1945, Cambridge University Press, ISBN 978-0-521-52240-3
