= Paul Campargue =

French journalist and politician (1903–1969)

Paul Jean Louis Campargue

Deputy for Yonne
- In office 3 May 1936 – 31 May 1942

Personal details
- Born: 21 September 1903 Marseille, Bouches-du-Rhône, France
- Died: Paris, France
- Occupation: Journalist, politician

Paul Jean Louis Campargue (21 September 1903 – 14 February 1969) was a French journalist and politician. As a journalist he specialized in radio, and was opposed to commercialization. He was socialist deputy for Yonne from 1936 to 1942.

== Life ==
=== Early years ===
Paul Jean Louis Campargue was born on 21 September 1903 in Marseille. He was the son of a Marseille tax collector. He attended the Collège Sainte-Barbe in Paris for his secondary education. He became a journalist very early. He joined the French Section of the Workers' International (SFIO: Section Française de l'Internationale Ouvrière). He became deputy director of the daily newspaper L'Aurore and vice-president of the Paris press union.

Campargue became involved in radio, edited Mon programme and was radio columnist for Le Populaire, a socialist daily. He felt that radio was a key medium for political parties. Paul Brenot, technical director of the Compagnie générale de la télégraphie sans fil (CSF), was an advocate of privatized radio stations along the American model, as opposed to the common European approach of nationalization. Camparque attacked Brenot's position, called it the "American radio bluff" and pointed out that almost all radio frequencies, transmitter and programs in the US were controlled by a small number of powerful corporations.

Campargue published an article on the "Police de l'Air" in Le Populaire on 7 March 1934. He highlighted the fact that the government was concerned about the use of ham radio and low-powered radio broadcasting to engage in subversive activities and cause political upheaval. He wrote, "We know precious little about the organization charged with monitoring programs of authorized radio stations and detecting transmissions from stations that do not comply with the radio authority."

=== Political career ===
In the general elections in May 1932 Campargue played a large role in getting Georges Boully elected in the Yonne department. Campargue ran for election to the Senate for Yonne on 26 April 1936, and was elected on the second ballot on 3 May 1936. He joined the Socialist group, and sat on the Committee on Public Works and the Committee on Communications and on Posts, Telegraphs and Telephones. He was rapporteur for the 1937 bill concerning reinforcement and reorganization of personnel in the broadcasting service. At the start of World War II he was mobilized as second lieutenant of a transport unit (train des équipages). His conduct earned him a citation in the order of the day. He refrained from voting to grant constitutional powers to Marshal Petain on 10 July 1940, and left politics. He was demobilized of 5 August 1940.

=== Later career ===
Campargue was excluded from the Socialist Party after the Liberation of France because he had abstained from voting against the bill revising the Constitution. He did not resume political activity, but continued his career in the press and publishing. He became managing director of the Ventillard group and of the "Transports-presse" company and chairman of the "Auxiliaire transports-presse". Paul Campargue died in Paris on 14 February 1969.

== Publications ==
- Campargue, Paul (1922), Titre(s) : Le congrès de Hambourg (septembre 1922) : une grande manifestation internationale de la jeunesse, Paris: l'Internationale de la jeunesse

== Sources ==
- Jolly, Jean (1960), "Campargue (Paul, Jean, Louis", Dictionnaire des parlementaires français de 1889 à 1940 (in French)
- Loviglio, Jason; Hilmes, Michele (2013-06-19), Radio's New Wave: Global Sound in the Digital Era, Routledge, ISBN 978-1-136-44631-3
- La documentation française (1988), "Campargue, Paul Jean Louis", Dictionnaire des parlementaires français de 1940 à 1958 (in French)
- Paul, Jean, Louis Campargue (in French), Assemblée nationale
- Scales, Rebecca P. (2016-02-24), Radio and the Politics of Sound in Interwar France, 1921-1939, Cambridge University Press, ISBN 978-1-107-10867-7
- Vaillant, Derek W. (Spring 2010), "La Police de l'Air: Amateur Radio and the Politics of Aural Surveillance in France, 1921-1940", French Politics, Culture & Society, 28 (No), Berghahn Books: 1–24, doi:10.3167/fpcs.2010.280101, JSTOR 42843635
- Wieviorka, Olivier (2009), Orphans of the Republic: The Nation's Legislators in Vichy France, Harvard University Press, ISBN 978-0-674-03261-3
