= Joseph Bethenod =

French electrical engineer and inventor (1883–1944)

- Born: Joseph Frédéric Julien Bethenod; 27 April 1883; Lyon, France
- Died: 21 February 1944 (aged 60); Paris, France
- Occupations: Engineer and inventor

Signature
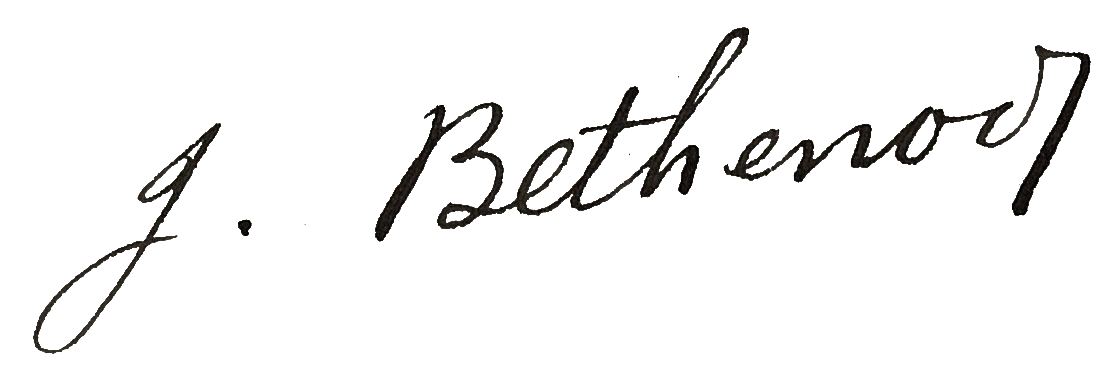

Joseph Bethenod (27 April 1883 – 21 February 1944) was a French electrical engineer and inventor best known for his inventions in the field of radio transmission, but interested in a wide variety of topics including electric motors and automobile technology.

== Life ==
Joseph Frédéric Julien Bethenod was born in Lyon on 27 April 1883, son of Francisque Bethenod and Jeanne Charvet. His father was an architect and his uncle, Emile Bethenod, was president of the Crédit Lyonnais. He had a classical education at Notre-Dame des Minimes in Lyon, then entered the École centrale de Lyon in 1900. After graduating he continued to study electricity. He published articles on the theory of electromagnetic machines which caught the attention of Professor André Blondel at the École des Ponts et Chaussées, who hired Bethenod as an assistant in 1903. In 1904 Bethenod proposed using artificial lakes to store surplus electrical power.

The engineer captain Gustave-Auguste Ferrié (1868–1932) gathered a team to work on wireless telegraphy for the French military. During his military service Ferrié, with whom Bethenod had already collaborated, took him as his assistant. They studied the application of resonant transformers to charging the capacitors of spark-gap transmitters. He became a friend of the officers Émile Girardeau and Paul Brenot during his period in the military. Bethenod then continued to explore subjects that interested him and wrote many articles in the journal l'Eclairage Electrique (Electric Lighting). He became editor in chief of this journal. He first described ferroresonance in electricity networks in a 1907 paper in this journal. He worked as a consulting engineer with various companies such as the Société Alsacienne de Constructions Mécaniques, to whom he had given his first patent in 1908. He became interested in the technology of strong electric currents, and later combined weak and strong current technology in his inventions.

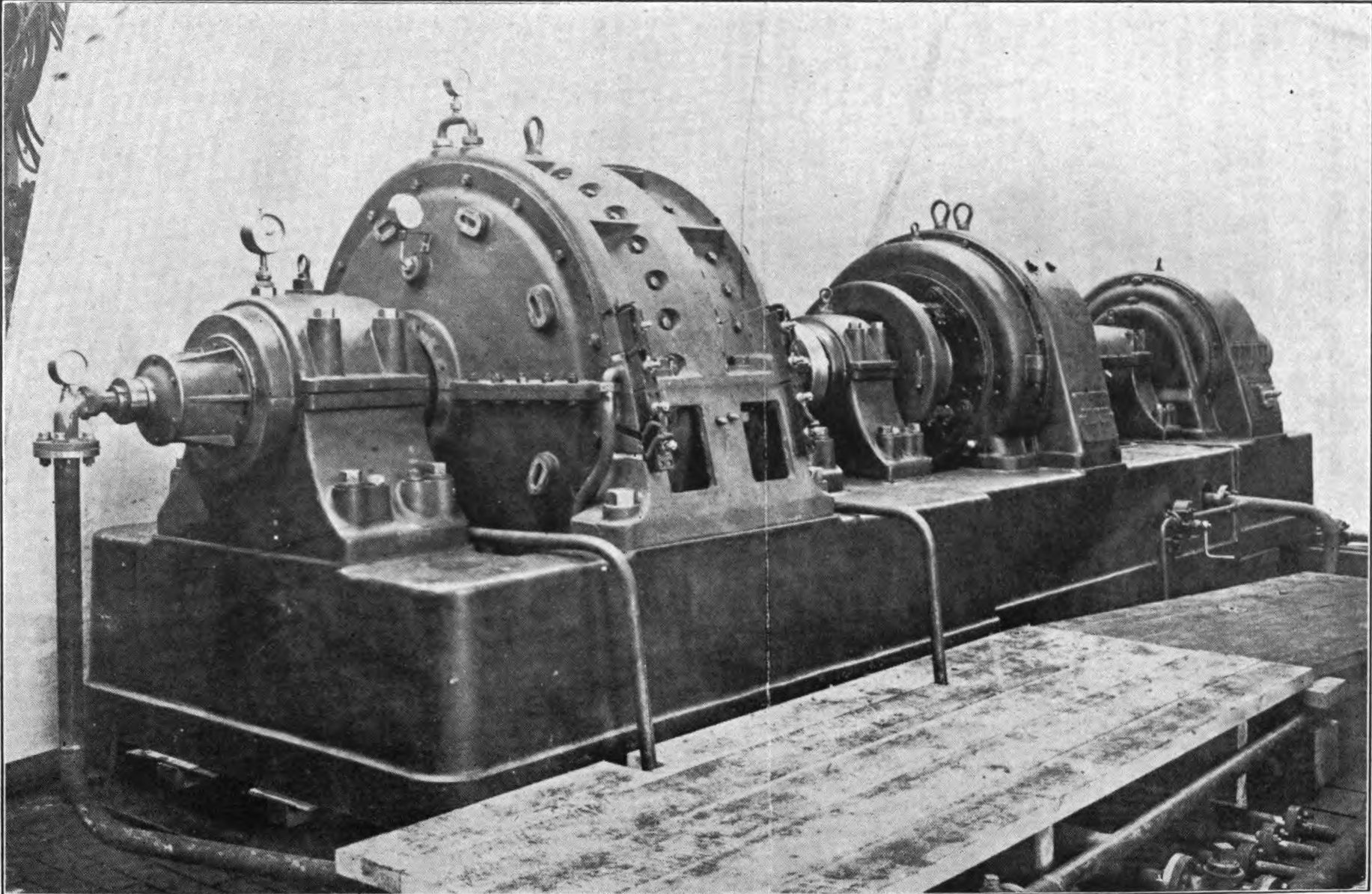
A Bethenod-Latour alternator (1920) invented during World War I by Marius Latour and Joseph Bethenod

Girardeau and Bethenod decided to found a company to meet military and civilian radio communication needs. They created the Société française radio-électrique (SFR: French Radio Telephone Company) in 1910. Paul Brenot was also an important contributor to development of the SFR. As chief engineer of the SFR Bethenod contributed several inventions in the area of wireless telegraphy including musical spark emitters, high frequency alternators and aircraft radio equipment. Bethenod's new techniques were used in the first radiotelegraph link in the tropics, between Brazzaville and Loango. This led to orders for SFR equipment from Belgium, Mexico, Turkey, Bulgaria, Serbia, Italy, Russia and China. In 1912 he lectured on wireless telegraphy at the École Superieure d'Electricité.

In 1922, with the support of the Compagnie des Compteurs, Bethenod created a remote control system. Bethenod was interested in the use of electricity in automobiles, including starter motors and dynamos. Bethenod was one of the funding vice-presidents of the Société des ingénieurs de l'automobile (Society of Automobile Engineers) in 1927. Bethenod was a fertile inventor, and filed over 300 patents. He was an Officer of the Legion of Honour. Joseph Bethenon died on 21 February 1944.

== Memberships ==
Bethenod was a member of various societies:

- Member of the council of the Société des Ingénieurs Civils de France, and President in 1942
- President of the Société française des électriciens
- Vice-President of the Société des ingénieurs de l'automobile
- Member of the Académie des Sciences, Belles Lettres et Arts de Lyon
- Member of the Académie des Sciences (Institut de France)
- Member of the board of the École centrale de Lyon
- President of the Association des Anciens Élèves de l'École Centrale Lyonnaise
- President of the Club du Faubourg

== Publications ==
Publications by Bethenod include:

- Joseph Béthenod (1908), "Sur le transformateur à résonance", Eclairage électrique, Chartres: impr. de Durand
- Joseph Béthenod (1923), Origine de la T.S.F.
- Joseph Béthenod (1932), Influence de l'Exposition Internationale d'Electricité de 1881 sur le développement de la Science et de la Technique
- Joseph Béthenod (1932), Historique des redresseurs de courant alternatifs
- Joseph Béthenod (1932), Dix années de T.S.F.
- Joseph Béthenod (1936), Remise de La médaille Mascart... La Vie et l'oeuvre de M. le professeur Arthur-Edwin Kennelly, Paris: Société française des électriciens
- Joseph Béthenod (1936), Notice sur les travaux scientifiques et industriels, Paris: Impr.-édit. Gauthier-Villars, p. 5
- Joseph Béthenod (28 January 1939), "Historique de l'industrie radioélectrique", Revue générale de l'électricité, XLV, Paris: R.G.E. (impr. de Chaix): 4
- Joseph Béthenod (1939), Notice complémentaire sur les travaux scientifiques de M. Joseph Béthenod, Paris: Gauthier-Villars, p. 16
- Joseph Béthenod (1940), Les Automobiles électriques, Paris: impr. Lang, Blanchong et Cie / Société des ingénieurs de l'automobile, p. 20
- René Laurent (1940), Les Mesures de l'électricien praticien, preface by Joseph Béthenod, Lyon, p. 239
- Henry Lanoy (1947), L'Equipement électrique d'automobile et de motocyclette, preface by Joseph Béthenod, Paris: Girardot (impr. de G. Lang), p. 34

== Sources ==
- Bethenod, J. (30 November 1907), "Sur le Transformateur à Résonance", L'Éclairage Électrique, 53
- Chambost, Emmanuel de (2012), La radioélectricité en France sous l'Occupation, Historiques (in French), l'Harmattan, archived from the original on 2017-08-22
- Darrieus, G. (June–July 1945), "Joseph Bethenod : Sa Vie et son Oeuvre", Tehnica (in French) (67–68), Association des Anciens Élèves de l'École Centrale Lyonnaise
- Delacroix, Laurent; Piernas, Gersende (2016), Société française radio-électrique (SFR - Thomson) (PDF) (in French), Roubaix: Archives nationales du monde du travail
- Ginoux, Jean-Marc (2017-05-26), History of Nonlinear Oscillations Theory in France (1880–1940), Springer International Publishing, ISBN 978-3-319-55239-2
- Joseph Béthenod (1883-1944) (in French), BnF: Bibliotheque nationale de France
- Morand, Xavier MORAND (March 1944), "Nécrologie", Journal des Ingénieurs de l'Automobile
- Valverde, V.; Mazón, A.J.; Zamora, I.; Buigues, G. (March 2007), "Ferroresonance in Voltage Transformers: Analysis and Simulations", International Conference on Renewable Energies and Power Quality (PDF), vol. 1
