= Radiola (radio station) =

1920s French radio station

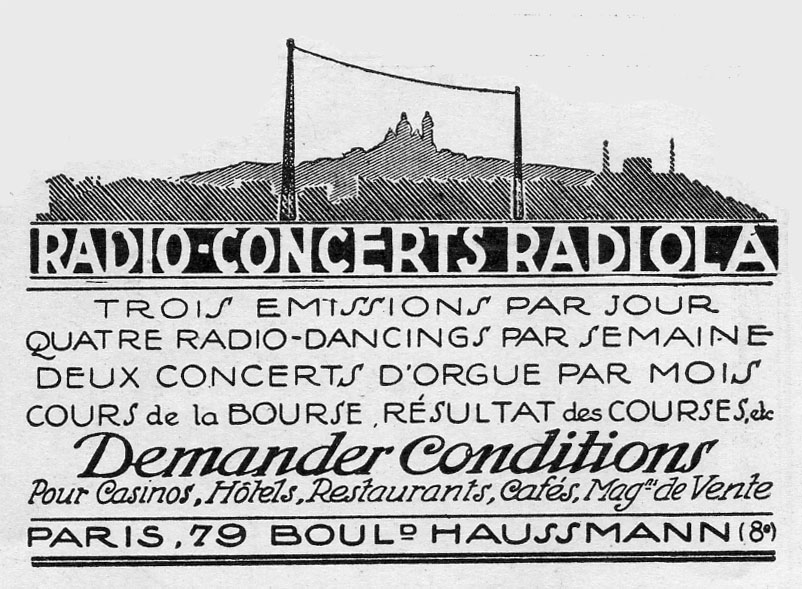
A 1924 advertisement promoting Radiola's programming

Radiola was a privately owned French radio station which broadcast under that name from 6 November 1922 until 28 March 1924 with the intention of promoting the sale of Radiola radio receivers, which were manufactured by the Société française radio-électrique (SFR), a subsidiary of the Compagnie générale de la télégraphie sans fil (CSF).

The Paris-based station made its first test transmissions on 26 June 1922 and its first news bulletin was broadcast on 6 January 1923. Radiola's chief announcer was Marcel Laporte.

Renamed Radio Paris on 29 March 1924, the station was taken into public ownership on 17 December 1933. It remained on air throughout the German occupation of France in World War II – under the control of the Nazi authorities and French collaborationists – until the liberation of Paris in August 1944.

== Sources ==
- Marcel Laporte, Les Mémoires de Radiolo, B. Grasset, Paris, 1925.
- Daniel Cauzard, Jean Perret, and Yves Ronin, "Radiola par la voie des ondes", in Le livre des marques, Éditeur Du May, Paris, 1993, p. 148, ISBN 9782841020003.
