= Cyrano radar family =

French military radar family

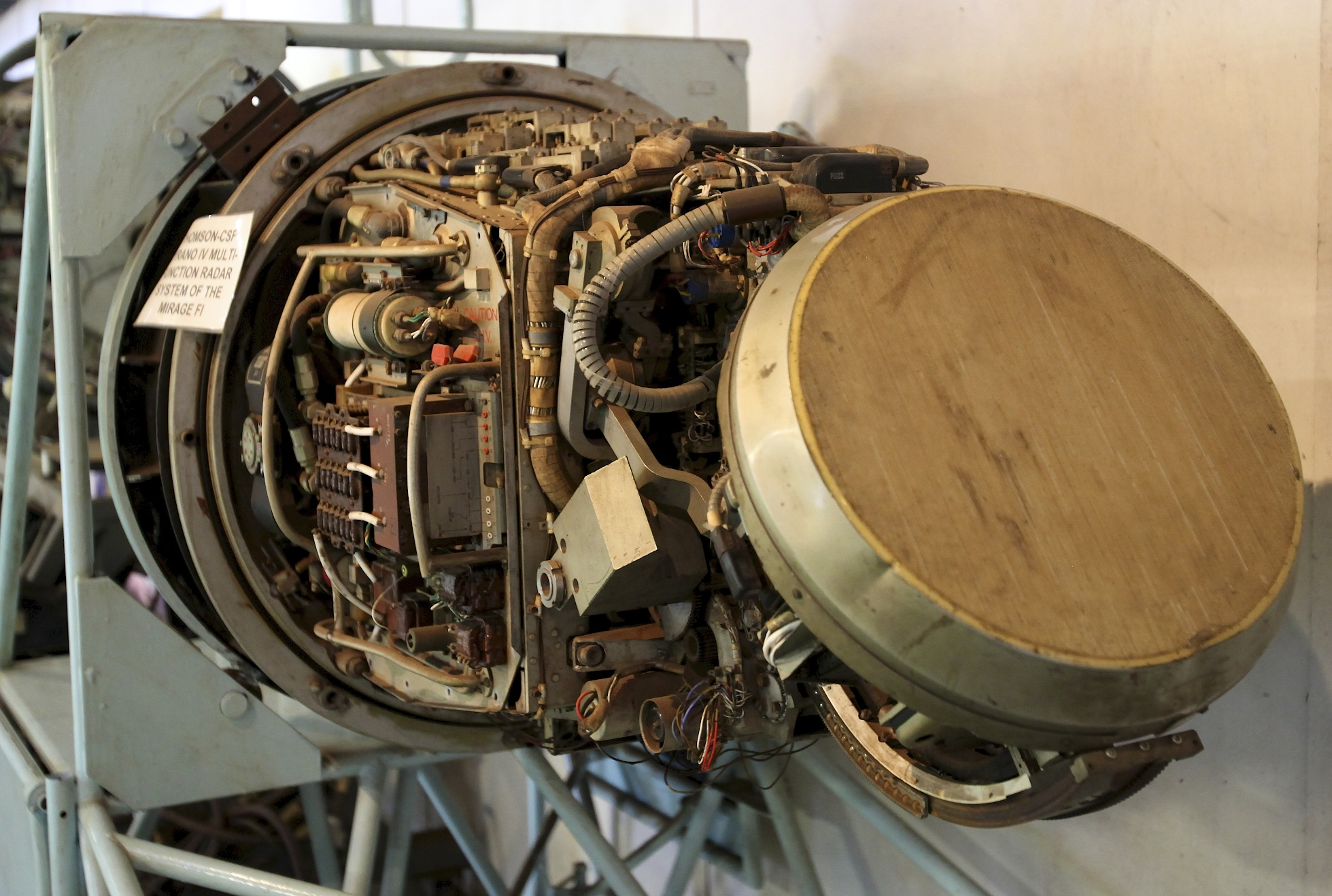
Thomson CSF Cyrano IV Aircraft radar as fitted on the Mirage F1

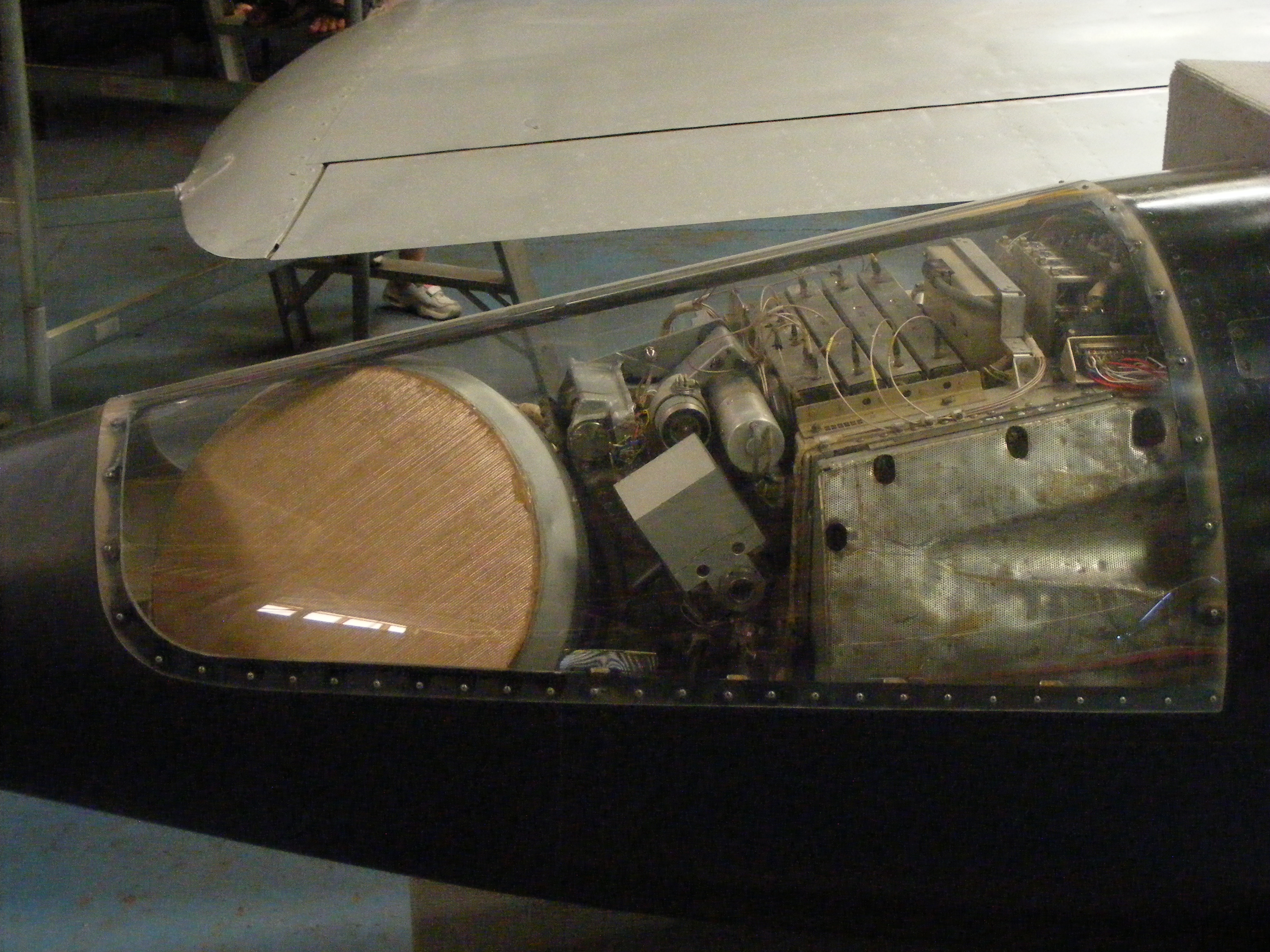
Dassault Mirage Cyrano 11 radar, as used in Australian Mirage III RAAF aircraft

The Cyrano radars are a family of French onboard radars, manufactured from the 1960s by the Compagnie Générale de la Télégraphie Sans Fil (CSF). These radars were originally used on the Mirage III C and Saab 35 Draken, and then in constantly evolving variants on different models of aircraft from Dassault Aviation and SEPECAT.

== Cyrano I ==
The Cyrano I was developed from 1958 for the French Air Force by CSF.

=== Components ===
The monopulse radar Cyrano I is located in the nose of the aircraft, in a pressurized enclosure. The antenna, with a diameter of 0.36 m, is movable in both Inclination and azimuth, using servo mechanisms. It includes a transmitter and a receiver. The transmitter, with a peak power of 300 kW in the band (λ = 3 cm), is a 4J 50 type magnetron. The receiver has a noise figure of 9 dB, with mixers and preamplifiers. The entire system consists of subminiature tubes of types 6111 and 61126, arranged in 30 rows containing 9, 7, or 5 tubes.

Cooling is provided by a circulation of water and glycol.

The radar has analog electronics responsible for processing the signal, telemetry, deviation measurements, antenna controls, as well as the navigation commands to the missiles before and after firing.

=== Capabilities ===
The radar is designed for the interception of bombers flying at high-altitude. It includes functions for detection, tracking, automatic navigation, missile guidance, and ground and contour mapping. It can help guiding when firing of 30mm DEFA and ADEN cannons, and guide the Matra R511 and R530 missiles, with a range adapted to the capabilities of these missiles.
