= Robert R. Warnecke =

Robert R. Warnecke was a noted French electrical engineer.

Warnecke was director of research at the Compagnie générale de la télégraphie sans fil (CSF) in Paris. He received the 1954 IEEE Morris N. Liebmann Memorial Award "for his many valuable contributions and scientific advancements in the field of electron tubes, and in particular, the magnetron class of traveling wave tubes."

== Selected publications ==
- Warnecke, R.R., Kleen, W., Lerbs, A., Dohler, O., Huber, H., "The Magnetron-Type Traveling-Wave Amplifier Tube", Proceedings of the IRE, Volume: 38, Issue: 5, May 1950, pages 486–495.
- R. Warnecke and P. Guénard, Les tubes électroniques à commande par modulation de vitesse, Paris, Gauthier-Villars, 1951.
- US Patent 2591322: Generator of Ultra-Short Electromagnetic Waves
- US Patent 2761088: Traveling Wave Amplifying Tube
- US Patent 2995675: Traveling Wave Tube
