= Edmond Lefebvre du Prey =

French politician (1866–1955)

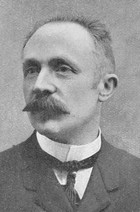
Edmond Lefebvre du Prey

Edmond Lefebvre du Prey (French pronunciation: [ɛdmɔ̃ ləfɛvʁ dy pʁɛ]; 16 October 1866 in Saint-Omer – 14 January 1955) was a French politician of the Third Republic.

Lefebvre du Prey was a member of the National Assembly from 1909 to 1927 representing Pas-de-Calais and then in the Senate from 1927 to 1940. He notably voted against a women's right to vote stating that it would disturb the household structure and that they would become the director of public affairs. He was also Minister of Agriculture from 1921 to 1922, Minister of Justice in 1924, and also Minister of Foreign Affairs in 1924.

Political offices
Preceded by Joseph Ricard	Minister of Agriculture; 1921–1922	Succeeded by Henry Chéron
Preceded by Maurice Colrat	Minister of Justice; 1924	Succeeded by Antony Ratier
Preceded by Raymond Poincaré	Minister of Foreign Affairs; 1924	Succeeded by Édouard Herriot
