= Radio Paris =

Former French radio station

Radio Paris was a French radio broadcasting company best known for its Axis propaganda broadcasts in Vichy France during World War II.

Radio Paris evolved from the first private radio station in France, called Radiola, founded by pioneering French engineer Émile Girardeau in 1922. It became Radio Paris on 29 March 1924, and remained so through 17 June 1940, transitioning to state ownership in December 1933 as the premier station in the country. It kept its name from July 1940 until August 1944, but the station was then run by Nazis and French collaborators.

From 1940, collaborationist voices on Radio Paris included Maurice Dorléac, Jacques Doriot and Philippe Henriot. From 1942, Jean Hérold-Paquis broadcast daily news reports on Radio Paris, in which he regularly called for the "destruction" of the United Kingdom. His catch phrase was "England, like Carthage, shall be destroyed!", echoing Cato the Elder's slogan Carthago delenda est.

On 19 September 1941, Maurice Chevalier sang in Le Poste Parisien his last success, "Notre Espoir", composed by his accompanist Henri Betti.

Radio Paris broadcasts were intended to counter the BBC broadcasts of Radio Londres by Free French figures like Pierre Dac, who sang the taunting refrain, Radio Paris ment, Radio Paris ment, Radio Paris est allemand ("Radio Paris lies, Radio Paris lies, Radio Paris is German"), to the tune of "La Cucaracha". On 8 May 1942 its transmitter in Bourges was blown up by the Resistance.

The station was shut down on the evening of 15 August 1944 by a trained police commando action, as part of the liberation of Paris. Maurice Dorléac, a former collaborator, was charged with national indignity by the Civic Court of Paris in 1945 and sentenced to a six-month prohibition on working in theatre and cinema for his Nazi propaganda works for Radio Paris.
