= Ferroresonance in electricity networks =

Ferroresonance, or nonlinear resonance, is a rare type of resonance in electric circuits which occurs when a circuit containing a nonlinear inductance is fed from a source that has series capacitance, and the circuit is subjected to a disturbance such as opening of a switch. It can cause overvoltages and overcurrents in an electrical power system and can pose a risk to transmission and distribution equipment and to operational personnel.

Ferroresonant effects were first described in a 1907 paper by Joseph Bethenod. The term ferroresonance was apparently coined by French engineer Paul Boucherot in a 1920 paper, in which he analysed the phenomenon of two stable fundamental frequency operating points coexisting in a series circuit containing a resistor, nonlinear inductor and a capacitor.

== Technical description ==
In general, "attempts to set precise limits for prevention of the phenomenon have been frustrating", and no complete model of the underlying physics is known. However, ferroresonance generally occurs when a transformer driving a system with primarily reactive (large imaginary part) impedance experiences perturbation to a single electrical phase. The transformer must be operating close to its saturation point, at which a real transformer's leakage inductance decreases dramatically.

Following perturbation, the transformer oscillates in and out of the saturated and unsaturated modes of operation each cycle, such that the cycle-average inductance cancels out the power line impedance. In situations where the primary impedance on the line is the several-hundred-picofarad shunt capacitance to ground, the combined transformer-power line system effectively acts as a low-impedance fault.

A nonlinear oscillation, ferroresonance exhibits substantial differences from a classical LC circuit. In particular, it occurs at a range of frequencies (often near harmonics of the utility frequency). Depending on the frequency, the transformer spends a different proportion of the cycle locked in the saturated mode. Ferroresonance is also resilient to the wavepoint of the initial perturbation and (to a limited extent) initial transformer core flux loading. Ferroresonant circuits exhibit a highly distorted waveform, and voltage and current at transitions in and out of the saturated mode typically show discontinuities or first-order singularities.

== Practical effects ==
In the electrical distribution field this typically occurs on a medium voltage electrical distribution network of transformers (inductive component) and power cables (capacitive component). If such a network has little or no resistive load connected and one phase of the applied voltage is then interrupted, ferroresonance can occur. If the remaining phases are not quickly interrupted and the phenomenon continues, overvoltage can lead to the breakdown of insulation in the connected components resulting in their failure.

During saturated moments, the very high current developed through one transformer coil may damage the equipment through Joule heating; during unsaturated moments, the very high voltage the transformer develops (five to six times the line voltage) may burn out nearby fuses or lightning arrestors.

The phenomenon can be avoided by connecting a minimal resistive load on the transformer secondaries or by interrupting the applied voltage by a three-phase interrupting device such as a ganged (three-pole) circuit breaker. In many cases, it also suffices to unground the transformer in a Δ configuration, which increases the line shunt impedance.

== See also ==
- Nonlinear resonance
- Constant-voltage transformer
