= Joseph-Honoré Ricard =

French politician (1880–1948)

Joseph Honoré Ricard
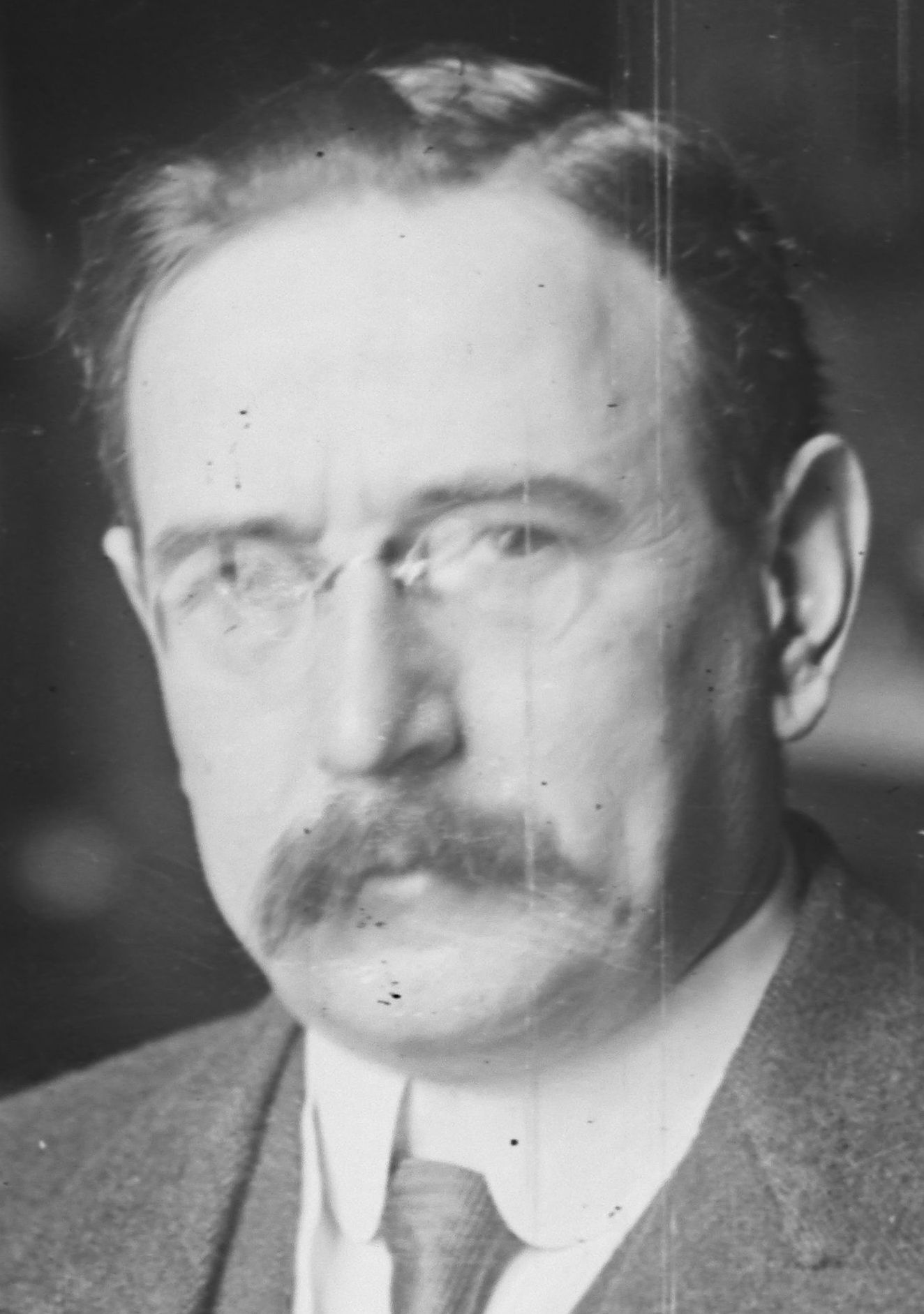
- Ricard in January 1921

Minister of Agriculture
- In office 20 January 1920 – 15 January 1921
- Preceded by: Joseph Noulens
- Succeeded by: Edmond Lefebvre du Prey

Personal details
- Born: 3 December 1880 Le Bouscat, Gironde, France
- Died: December 1948
- Occupation: Agronomist

Joseph Honoré Ricard (3 December 1880 – December 1948) was a French agronomist who was active in agricultural unions. He was Minister of Agriculture in 1921–22.

== Life ==
Joseph Honoré Ricard was born in Le Bouscat, Gironde, on 3 December 1880. He studied at the National Agronomical Institute, where he was a brilliant student. He then became a specialist in the problems of mutuality, insurance and organization of trade unions. Ricard held important positions in the Union of Agricultural Syndicates (union des syndicats agricoles) and the Society of Farmers of France (Société des agriculteurs de France).

During World War I (1914–18) Ricard was mobilized, then released to hold various positions in the Ministry of Agriculture. He set up an organization where the unemployed and refugees were put to work in the fields. He was head of the Department of Immigration and Agricultural Labor. In 1919 he founded the National Confederation of Agricultural Associations.

Ricard was a member of the steering committee of the Congrès de la natalité, first held in Nancy in 1919. The participants at the congress decided the main tasks for family policy were to fight pornography, abortion, and neo-Malthusian propaganda; to fight slums and housing construction projects; to support the vote familial; and to work toward expansion of family benefits; subsidies for nornbreuses; and a "moral reform of intelligences and wills". Although not a deputy, Ricard was appointed Minister of Agriculture from 20 January 1920 to 15 January 1921 in the first and second cabinets of Alexandre Millerand and the cabinet of Georges Leygues.

Ricard was a member of the Academy of Agriculture where he replaced Jules Méline. Ricard founded Radio-Agricole Française (RAF) in 1927. The RAF promoted the value of radio in allowing rural families to stay in touch with the world. Paul Brenot, as vice-president of the Syndicat Professionel des Industries Radioélectriques, became a member of the group He was commander of the Legion of Honour. Joseph Ricard died in December 1948.

== Publications ==
Publications by Joseph Ricard included:

- Joseph Honoré Ricard (1908), Le Mouvement syndical agricole, extraits de discours prononcés à Mende et à Rodez, les 20 et 24 septembre 1908, Paris: Union centrale des syndicats des agriculteurs de France, p. 8
- Joseph Honoré Ricard (1911), Au pays landais. Exploitation des forêts résineuses, preface by Eugène Tisserand, Paris: J.-B. Baillière et fils, p. 252
- Joseph Honoré Ricard (October 1921), "Les Origines de la première conférence internationale des épizooties, fièvre aphteuse, peste bovine", Revue de zootechnie (1), Paris: impr. de Chaix: 12
- Joseph Honoré Ricard (1922), Défendons le vin, Paris: impr. de Dubois et Bauer, p. 20
- Joseph Honoré Ricard (1926), L'Exportation des produits agricoles, Paris: Comité d'action économique et douanière, p. 22
- Joseph Honoré Ricard (10 May 1927), "La Revision douanière et l'équilibre économique de la France", Revue politique et parlementaire (2 ed.), Paris: Bureaux de la "Revue politique et parlementaire: 34
- Joseph Honoré Ricard (1928), Le Grand tourisme dans le Nord-Africain. L'Oeuvre du président Dal Piaz, Paris: Ligue maritime et coloniale, p. 24
- Joseph Honoré Ricard (1928), Une politique du logement. Jean Lévêque. Le Logement urbain. J.-H. Ricard. Le Logement rural, Les Cahiers du redressement français, 15, Paris: Éditions de la S.A.P.E., p. 228
- Joseph Honoré Ricard (20 May 1932), "État actuel de la flotte frigorifique française", Communications et mémoires. Académie de marine, Paris: Société d'éditions géographiques, maritimes et coloniales: 187–194
- Joseph Honoré Ricard (1934), "L'Intervention de l'État dans la gestion des compagnies de navigation", Communications et mémoires de l'Académie de marine, XIII, Paris: Société d'éditions géographiques, maritimes et coloniales: 63–96
- Joseph Honoré Ricard (1935), Adolphe Martin-Claude (1873-1935), ingénieur-agronome, commissaire spécial honoraire au service de la répression des fraudes, Vannes: Impr. Lafolye et J. de Lamarzelle, p. 4
- Maurice Pittiot; Joseph Honoré Ricard (1943), Journée française du froid, Paris: Association française du froid (impr. de L. Jeanrot), p. 80

== Sources ==
- Joseph-Honoré RICARD (in French), Ministère de l'Agriculture et de l'Alimentation, 31 August 2012
- Joseph Honoré Ricard (1880-1948) (in French), BnF: Bibliotheque nationale de France
- Robcis, Camille (2013-04-19), The Law of Kinship: Anthropology, Psychoanalysis, and the Family in France, Cornell University Press, ISBN 978-0-8014-6839-1
- Scales, Rebecca (2016-02-24), Radio and the Politics of Sound in Interwar France, 1921-1939, Cambridge University Press, ISBN 978-1-107-10867-7
