= Lucien Lévy =

French physicist and engineer (1892–1965)

- Lucien Lévy
- Born: 11 March 1892; Paris
- Died: 24 May 1965 (aged 73)
- Occupation: Engineer

Lucien Lévy (French pronunciation: [lysjɛ̃ levi]; 11 March 1892 – 24 May 1965) was a French radio engineer and radio receiver manufacturer. He invented the superheterodyne method of amplifying radio signals, used in almost all AM radio receivers. His patent claim was at first disallowed in the United States in favour of the American Edwin Howard Armstrong, but on appeal Lévy's claim as inventor was accepted in the US.

== Early years ==
Lucien Lévy was born in Paris on 11 March 1892. He attended school in Paris at the Collège Rollin, then the Collège Chaptal. He obtained his diploma as an engineer from the École supérieure de physique et de chimie industrielles de Paris.

== World War I ==
During World War I (1914–18) Lévy was assigned to Colonel Gustave-Auguste Ferrié as sapper-telegraphist. Captain Paul Brenot headed the second group of the Military Telegraphic Service. Members of the group included Henri Abraham, Maurice de Broglie, Paul Laüt and Lucien Lévy. He was made head of the Eiffel Tower Military Radio Telegraphy laboratory in 1916. The laboratory was in a wooden barracks on the Champ de Mars, and used the Eiffel tower as an antenna for 100 kW radio transmissions. Levy developed in turn the first low frequency amplifier, which made it possible to listen to the enemy's telephone conversations, ground-based telegraphy, the first airplane receiver with vacuum tubes, the first wireless telegraphy station for automobiles and the superheterodyne receiver.

== Superheterodyne invention ==
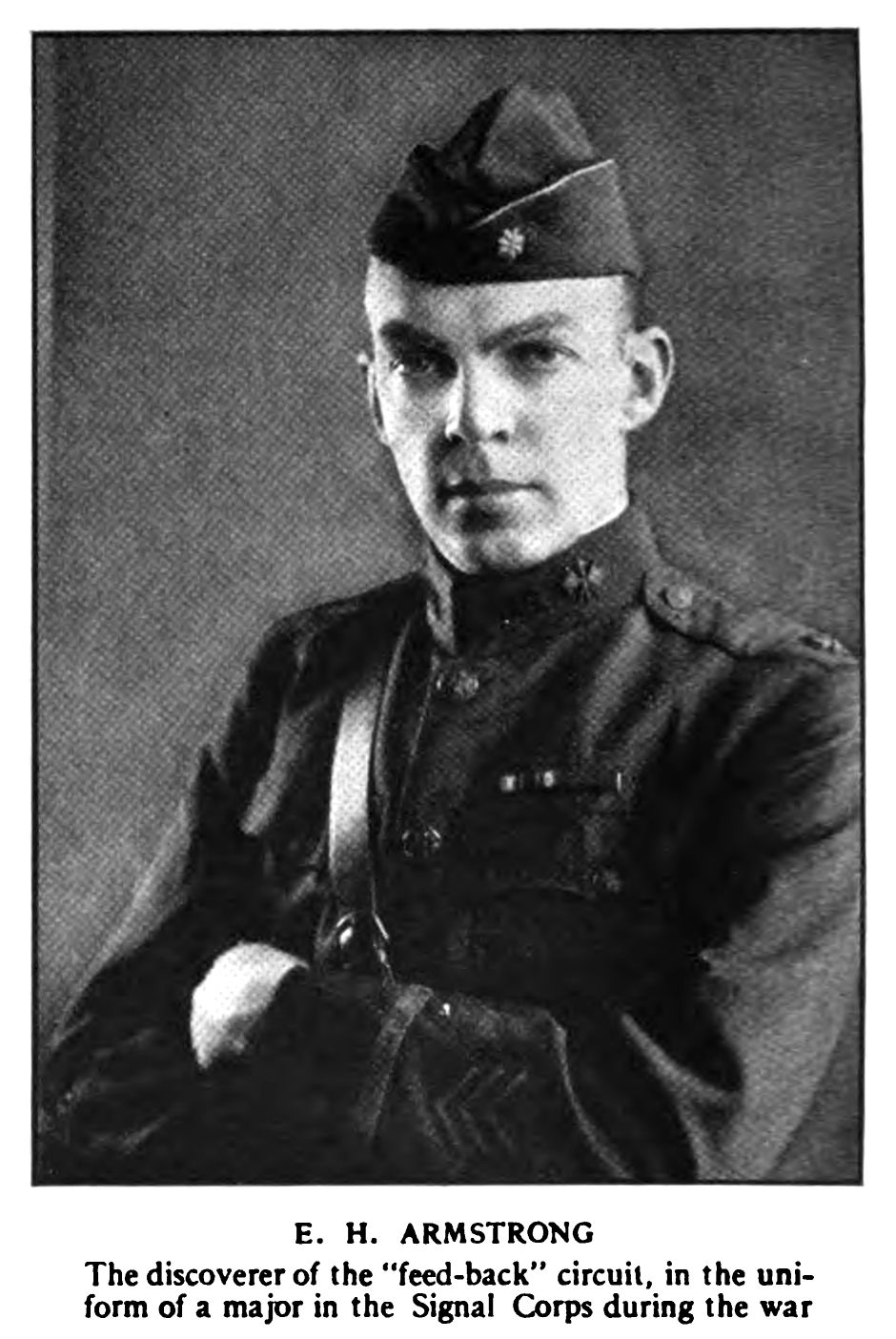
Edwin H Armstrong in World War I signal corps uniform

The original concept of Amplitude Modulation (AM) radio was developed by the Canadian-born Reginald Aubrey Fessenden, who invented the word "heterodyne" from the Greek words heteros (other) and dynamis (force). In an improvement over Fessenden's design, the superheterodyne principle uses a variable oscillator and a fixed narrow filter to amplify an incoming AM radio signal. Lévy filed a patent application for the superheterodyne principle in August 1917 with brevet n° 493660. The American Edwin Howard Armstrong also filed a patent in 1917. Levy filed his original disclosure about seven months before Armstrong's. Levy later claimed that Armstrong had stolen his idea while serving in Paris in the signal corps. Lévy described an improved version in a second patent in 1918. The German inventor Walter H. Schottky also filed a patent in 1918.

The US refused to recognise these patents, and recognised Armstrong as the inventor. Armstrong's US Patent 1,342,885 was issued on 8 June 1920. AT&T paid US$20,000 in 1920 for Levy's first patent application in the hope that it would be judged to be fundamental, as well as his corresponding US patent application. After various changes and court hearings Levy was awarded a US patent No 1,734,038 that included seven of the nine claims in Armstrong's application, while the two remaining claims were granted to Alexanderson of GE and Kendall of AT&T. This had no effect in France, but a German patent was issued to Levy on 1 October 1931.

== Later career ==
In 1920 Lévy founded the Etablisssements Radio LL, specializing in construction of radio receivers. Lévy was one of the early contributors to the Onde Electrique magazine, founded in 1921. Lévy was president of the Wireless Telegraphy syndicate in 1922. His company began mass production that year. Radio LL made the first tube receivers, and in 1922 it produced a receiver with high-frequency amplification with circuits tuned by adjustable iron cores. In 1923 he built his first portable transmitter. In 1924 Radio LL produced the first mass-produced superheterodyne receiver, made in separate blocks, followed the next year with a superheterodyne with a single tuning control. Also in 1924 it produced a radio compass with a rotating frame. In 1924 Lévy invented the horizontal dipole antenna with feeder, and in 1925 the V antenna, polyphase antennas and folded dipole antenna. In 1924 the horizontal polarized antenna let Levy obtain experiment results that confirmed the existence of the ionizing Kennelly-Heaviside Layer. In 1925 Lévy was president of SPIR (Syndicat Professionnel des Industries Radioélectriques).

In an attempt to stimulate sales of radio receivers, in March 1926 his company launched Radio LL using a 1 kW transmitter from the rue de Javel facility in Paris. Lévy was introduced to the young jazz enthusiast Jacques Bureau and invited him to broadcast a weekly jazz show. Bureau, who possessed just 30 records, invited Hugues Panassié to partner with him on the show. The Police de l'Air screened the programs for ideological content, and he was criticized for giving airtime to the right-wing nationalist Henri de Kérillis. However, Lévy spent more time improving his receivers than in managing the station, which did not gain a large audience. In May 1935 Lévy sold the station to Marcel Bleustein, the young boss of Publicis, who converted it into "Radio Cité". Bleustein understood that to attract big advertisers the station operator had to conduct audience research, which led to more sponsored variety shows, light drama, games and popular songs. Radio-Cité was a pioneer in the invention of popular radio.

In 1930 Lévy made the radio equipment used by Jean Mermoz in his crossing of the South Atlantic. During World War II (1939–45), being Jewish, Lévy went into hiding during the German occupation of France. From 1943 until his death Lévy studied the fundamental problems of physics. He developed a new theory of electron structure that attracted interest in the scientific world. After World War II (1939–45) Lévy continued to manufacture radio receivers. In 1950 he patented a new servo-mechanism system. Lucien Lévy died on 24 May 1965.

== Sources ==
- Dregni, Michael (2006), Django: The Life and Music of a Gypsy Legend, Oxford University Press, ISBN 978-0-19-530448-0
- Ginoux, Jean-Marc (2017-05-26), History of Nonlinear Oscillations Theory in France (1880–1940), Springer International Publishing, ISBN 978-3-319-55239-2
- Howarth, Richard J. (2017-05-27), Dictionary of Mathematical Geosciences: With Historical Notes, Springer, ISBN 978-3-319-57315-1
- Klooster, John W. (2009), Icons of Invention: The Makers of the Modern World from Gutenberg to Gates, ABC-CLIO, ISBN 978-0-313-34743-6
- Koster, John (3 December 2016), "Radio Lucien Lévy", Vintage Radio Web
- "Lucien LÉVY 1892–1965) In Memoriam" (PDF), Bulletin (in French) (48), Ecole Supérieure de Physique et de Chimie Industrielle de Paris, June 1966
- Magill, Frank N. (2013-05-13), The 20th Century A-GI: Dictionary of World Biography, Routledge, ISBN 978-1-136-59334-5
- Martin, Marc (October–December 1988), "Le marché publicitaire Français et les grands médias 1918-1970", Vingtième Siècle. Revue d'histoire (in French) (20), Sciences Po University Press: 75–90, doi:10.2307/3768677, JSTOR 3768677
- Printz, Jean-Marc, "Lucien LEVY", 100 ans de Radio (in French)
- Vaillant, Derek W. (Spring 2010), "La Police de l'Air: Amateur Radio and the Politics of Aural Surveillance in France, 1921–1940", French Politics, Culture & Society, 28 (1), Berghahn Books: 1–24, doi:10.3167/fpcs.2010.280101, JSTOR 42843635
