= Eugène Adrien Ducretet =

French scientific instrument manufacturer

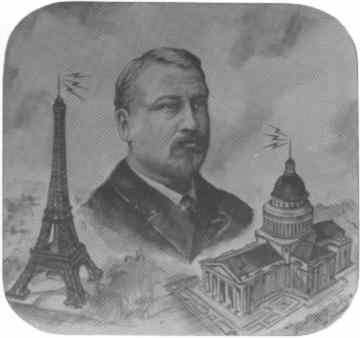
Drawing of Ducretet in 1898, celebrating his November 5, 1898 transmission of radio signals between the Eiffel Tower and the Panthéon.

Eugène Adrien Ducretet (November 27, 1844 – 1915) was a French scientific instrument manufacturer, who performed some of the first experiments on wireless telegraphy (radio communication) in France. His father, Louis Joseph Ducretet, was a Savoy textiles merchant who moved to Paris. He never completed a formal education, leaving primary school at age 15. After several years apprenticed to Paris engineer Paul-Gustav Froment, Ducretet opened his own workshop in 1864 at 21 Rue des Ursulines where with a few employees he manufactured classical physics research, teaching and demonstration apparatus, such as galvanometers, Wimshurst machines, and Crookes tubes. Over time his reputation grew and he became instrument supplier to several large Paris educational and scientific institutions. He was awarded a gold medal for his quality instruments at the 1878 Paris Universal Exposition and from then on his firm was a regular presence at important international expositions, winning another gold at the 1881 International Electricity Exposition in Paris. He was made a Knight of the Legion of Honour in 1885.

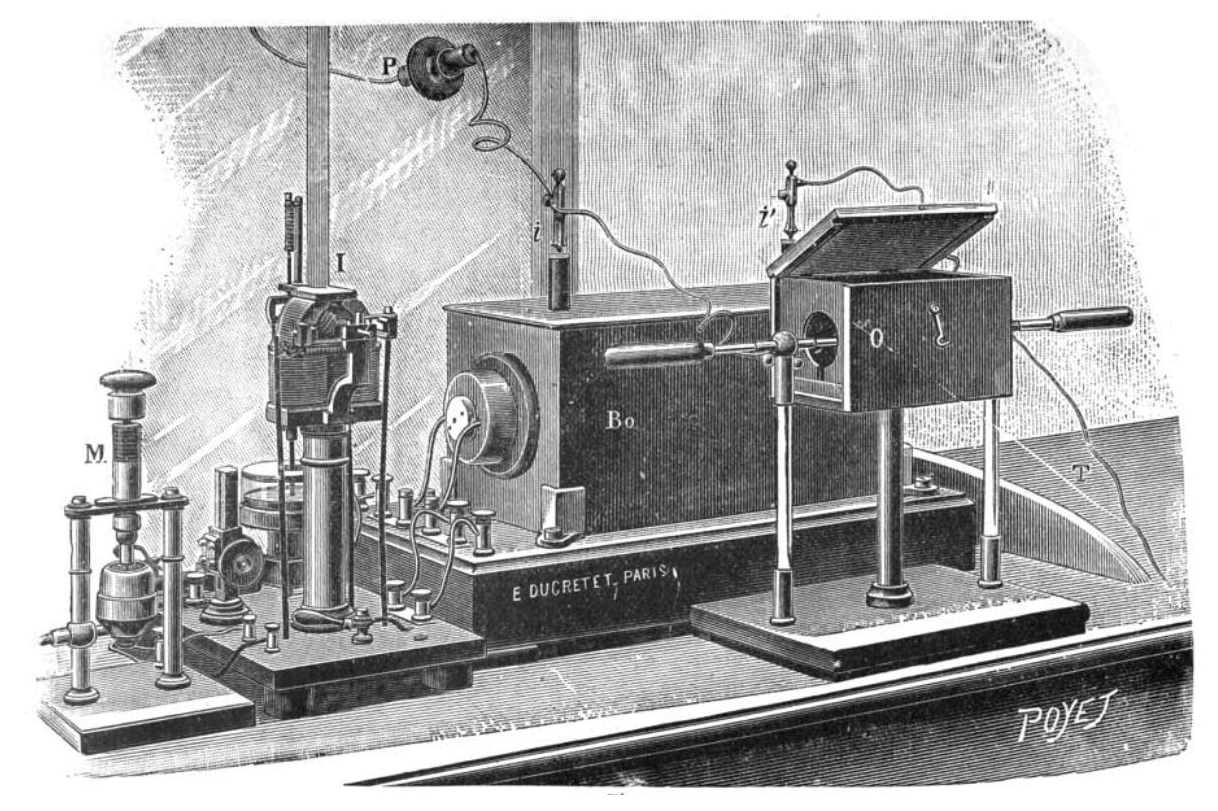
Ducretet's spark-gap transmitter apparatus.

Ducretet's work brought him into close contact with many prominent physicists of his day, from whom he learned a lot. He continued his education, attending courses at the Sorbonne and College de France as a 'auditeur libre'. In 1897, hearing about Guglielmo Marconi's pioneering experiments in wireless telegraphy (radio transmission), he built a transmitter and receiver and began his own experiments, becoming the first person in France to transmit radio waves. In November 1897 he transmitted radio signals 400 meters between his workshop and the Panthéon, attracting the interest of French President Félix Faure. On November 5, 1898 he caused a sensation with a public demonstration of wireless communication in the presence of representatives of the Académie des Sciences between the third floor of the Eiffel Tower and the Panthéon 4 km away. In 1897 he wrote to Russian physicist Alexander Stepanovich Popov, who had invented one of the first practical radio receivers but had not developed it, suggesting a collaboration. In 1898 he began to build radiotelegraph equipment using the Popov design. Between 1899 and 1904 he sold some of the first wireless stations to the Russian Navy, but the company was too small to provide the volume Russia needed. With his partner Ernest Roger he invented a type of telegraph key used in wireless telegraphy transmitters. In 1901 he wrote a book on the construction of wireless equipment

Ducretet married Amelie Vallat in 1866, and they had three children. When he died he left the company to his son Fernand and partner Ernst Roger. The company was sold to Thomson-Houston in 1931.
