= Radiotechnique =

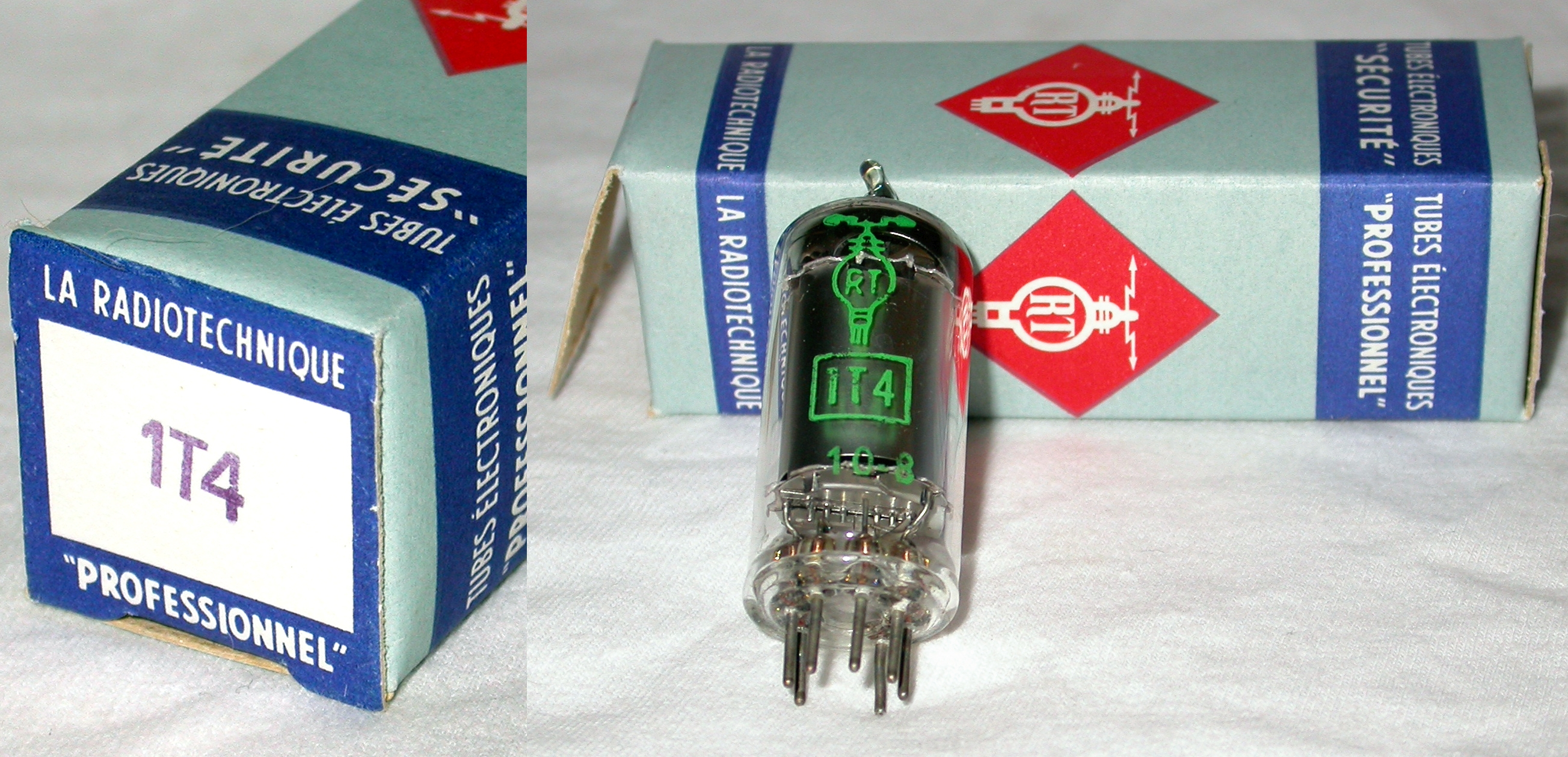
- Vacuum tube 1T4 manufactured by La Radiotechnique
- Industry: Electronics
- Founded: 1919
- Defunct: 2002
- Fate: Acquired
- Headquarters: Suresnes, Paris, France
- Parent: Compagnie générale de la télégraphie sans fil

Radiotechnique (French pronunciation: [ʁadjotɛknik], RT) was a French electronics company that made radio transmitting and receiving vacuum tubes, and later more advanced components such as integrated circuits and solar panels. At first it was a subsidiary of the French Compagnie générale de la télégraphie sans fil (CSF). Later it became a subsidiary of Philips of the Netherlands. The company expanded after World War II, moving into television and electronics, including photovoltaics and printed circuits, and in 1979 had about 15,000 employees. Later it lost market share, went through various restructurings, was sold in 1998 and went bankrupt in 2002.

== CSF subsidiary (1919–31) ==
The Compagnie générale de la télégraphie sans fil (CSF) was formed in 1919 as a holding company for the Société française radio-électrique and other subsidiaries in fields related to radio-electricity. Radiotechnique was initially based in Lyon in 1919. The Radiotechnique subsidiary of the CSF was formed in 1919 to research and develop electronic transmission and reception tubes. In 1921 Radiotechnique began to make radio sets at its Suresnes factory. During the 1920s the company made wireless telephony transmitters and receiving sets, receiving tubes (lampes de réception) and amplifiers. Yves Rocard, a graduate of the Ecole Normale, was recruited in 1928 by Roger Julia, the director of the company, and given the task of producing triodes for the new radio sets. Maurice Ponte was hired soon after. The "Radiola" trademark was used for radio receivers as well as for a radio station.

Although France was not immediately affected by the Great Depression, CSF felt the effect in 1929 since radio transmission was mainly the result of global commercial activity. In 1929 CSF transferred production of Radiola's consumer radio sets from SFR to Radiotechnique. There was a legal dispute in 1929 between CSF and Philips of the Netherlands over patents for the new radio sets connected directly to the mains electricity, which CSF won. However, CSF made an agreement with Philips under which CSF would drop its amateur equipment line and Philips would not compete on professional equipment.

== Philips-CSF joint venture (1931–39) ==
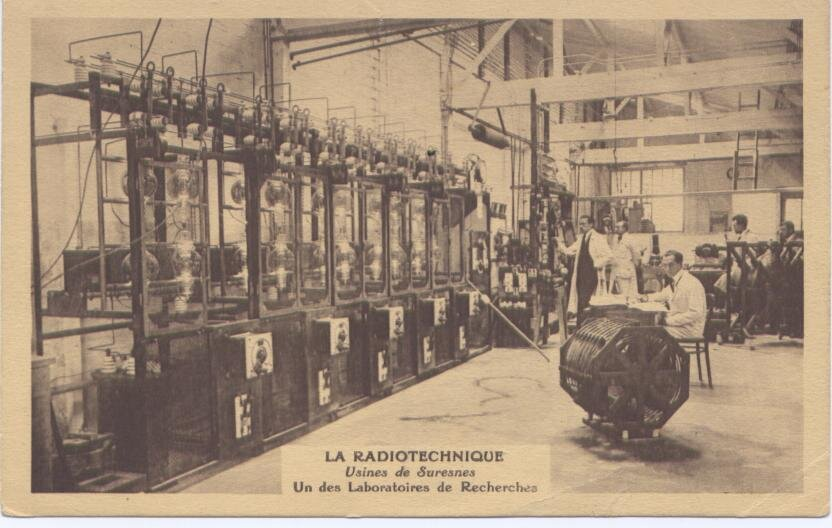
Laboratory of “La Radiotechnique” factory in Suresnes in 1937..

Radiotechnique was purchased by Philips in 1931. Philips bought only half the shares of Radiotechnique, but in practice fully controlled the subsidiary. CSF used the sale of its stake in Radiotechnique to strengthen its position in the professional sector. Under the agreement with Philips the CSF scientific center left Radiotechnique and moved to Levallois as part of the SFR. Roger Julia was replaced by Henri Damelet, an executive who had joined the company in 1924. CSF remained well-represented on the board of directors, and publicity over the transfer of control was avoided. CSF held 70,000 registered shares while Philips held 70,000 bearer shares via the Midland Bank of London, which was represented on the board by Guy Thurneyssen.

The two Radiotechnique factories, making tubes and radio sets, covered a large area on both sides of the Rue Carnot, connected by an underground passage. 93% of the tubes were used for consumer radio sets, the others being used for the PTT, army and other purposes. At the end of 1937 sales volumes were well below expectations and the plant was closed to dispose of stocks. There were 1,200 employees in 1936–37, which fell to 700 in the years that followed. In 1939 CSF still held 49.9% of the capital of Radiotechnique, but Philips controlled the company. Many of the radio sets sold under CSF's former "Radiola" trademark were imported from the Netherlands.

== World War II (1939–45) ==
At the start of World War II (1939–45) Radiotechnique received important orders for radio equipment from the French Army, and increased its workforce to 1,400. The share of tubes for the consumer market fell to 44%. Given the large British participation, when the Germans occupied Paris they considered Radiotechnique to be spoils of war (Beutelager) and requisitioned the Suresnes factory on 24 June 1940. Some of the equipment from the tubes factory was removed. The factory was allowed to resume production of equipment for the telephone network and cheap radio receivers, which were popular with the occupying troops. During 1941 and 1942 at least five German directors were installed in the Suresnes factory. By 1944 there were 2,300 workers, with a large proportion of output going to Germany for civilian or military use.

== Post war (1945–2002) ==
Locations in France

After the war Radiotechnique grew fast. Philips acquired total control of Radiotechnique in 1947. The Suresnes factory in 1951 produced half of France's reception tubes and 30–40% of the wireless telephony receivers. By virtue of its association with Philips it had the financial, technical and commercial resources to enter the television market when it developed in France, and later to enter industrial electronics. This phase was marked by financial restructuring, recruitment and training of managers and technicians, and by geographical expansion of manufacturing facilities. New factories were opened to the west of the Suresnes parent factory. The factory at Suresnes with 2,500 employees was followed by:

Year opened	Location	Products	1960 employees
1953	Chartres	Electronic tubes	1,147
1954	Rambouillet	Radio and television receivers	842
1955	Évreux	Electronic Components	951
1956	Dreux	Television and cathode tubes	1,242
1956	Nogent-le-Rotrou	Spare parts	592
1957	Caen	Semi-conductors	1,480

The Évreux industrial center was located on Rue Pierre Brossolette from 1955, operated by a subsidiary Coprim (Compagnie des Produits élémentaires pour Industries Modernes) which mass-produced basic electronic components for mass market devices. By 1959 Radiotechnique had acquired 20% of COGECO, whose factories in Tours and Joué-lès-Tours manufactured capacitors.

Dreux gives an example of the problems encountered. Officials there heard that the company was looking for a site for a new plant and offered cheap land, help in improving infrastructure and plentiful local labour. In 1956 Radiotechnique opened a television assembly plant and a factory for electronic components and cathode-ray tubes in Dreux. More than 1,000 workers were to be employed in the new facilities. The workers promised by Dreux, displaced from closed facilities of Grosdemouge, Potez, the foundry and Firmin-Didot, were too highly skilled for routine production-line assembly jobs. They were unionized and demanded higher wages than the company could afford. The new plants were short of several hundred workers when they opened. Radiotechnique brought in workers from Italy, Hungary and Spain to open the factory, but there was high turnover. In the following years recruiters continued to hire semiskilled workers in Italy, Spain and Morocco. By 1970 about 39% of the workers were foreign-born. Often they lived in primitive conditions in all-male dormitories built by the company.

In the early 1950s RT was one of three major vertically integrated tube producers in France, the others being Thomson-CSF and the Compagnie Générale d'Electricité (CGE). In the late 1950s Radiotechnique, Philips and Mullard sold Dario commercial photomultipliers for detection of nuclear radiation, developed by the research arm Laboratoires d'électronique et de physique appliquée (LEP). RTC was a major manufacturer of photovoltaics and pioneered terrestrial applications as early as 1961. In 1968 Radiotechnique had 30% of the French market for television sets and 50% of the market for picture tubes. As of 1979 RTC was the French components division of Philips Elcoma, and the manufacturer of their solar panels. In 1979 RTC manufactured the Philips BPx47 range solar panel while LEP undertook research into applied photovoltaics. As of 1979 La Radiotechnique was a major manufacturer of electronics equipment, radio receivers and television sets under the "Radiola" and "Philips" brands. The Radiotechnique group had about 15,000 employees in France.

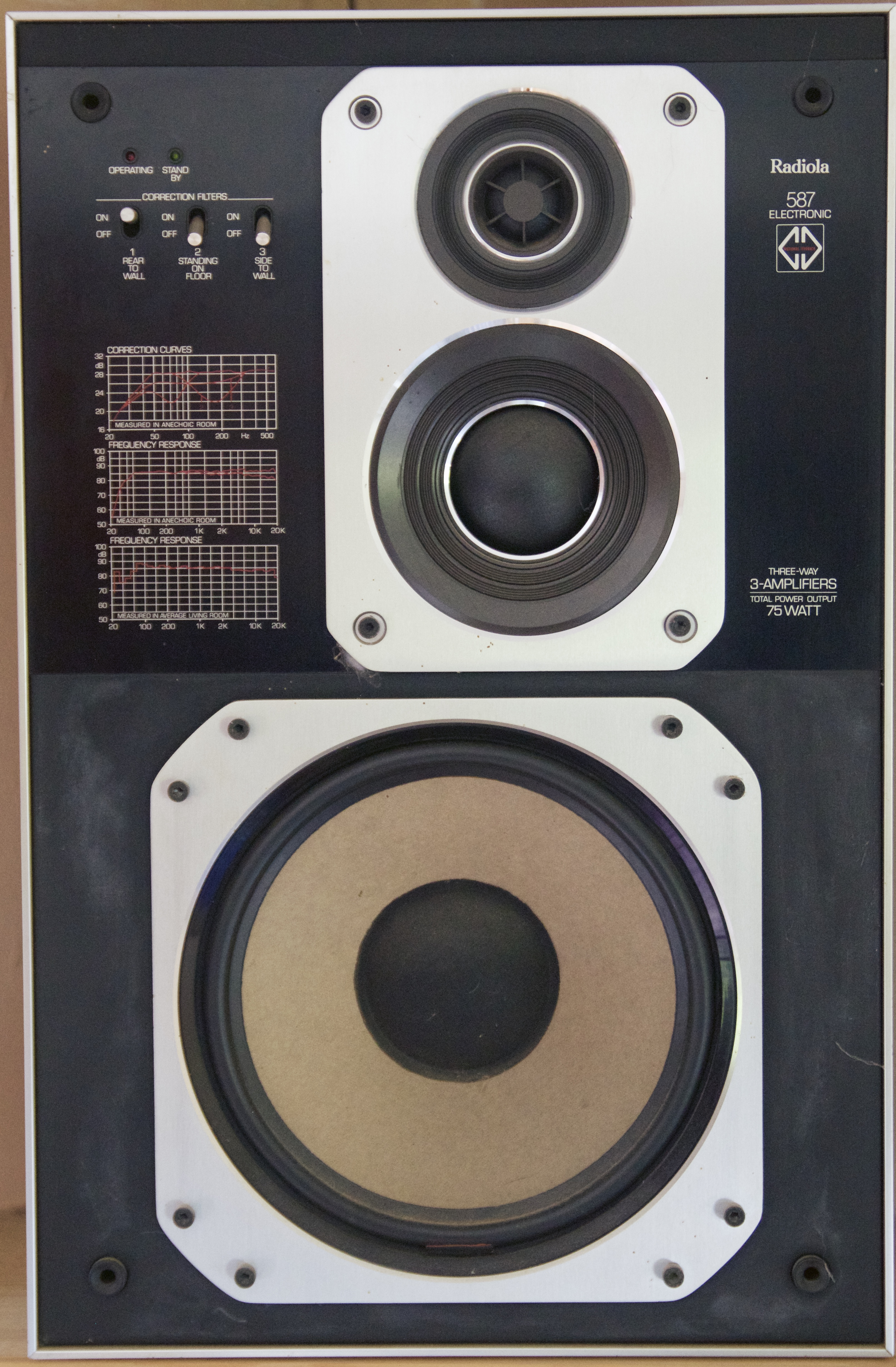
Radiola MFB-587 active loudspeaker with Motional Feedback.

Radiotechnique began commercial production of semiconductors around 1954. In 1965 all electronic component research, development and production, previously distributed between Coprim and the Radiotechnique "Tubes and Semiconductors" division was grouped into the new subsidiary Radiotechnique-Coprim (RTC). Radiotechnique became the parent company for RTC and LEP. In June 1967 Philips, Radiotechnique and the Compagnie Générale d'Electricité formed a joint venture named RTC: Radiotechnique-Compelec. This took over all the industrial establishments in Caen, Chartres, Dreux, Évreux, Suresnes, Tours and Joué-lès-Tours. It made ferrite cores, printed circuits, ceramic dielectric capacitors, memory matrices and wirewound resistors. In the late 1960s Radiotechnique produced Sylvania's SUHL-TTL integrated circuits, which were sold to the French computer maker Bull and to the computer division of Philips. In 1968 Radiotechnique Compelec had 22% of the French semiconductor market, ahead of Sescosem and Texas Instruments, who both had 20%.

Radiotechnique was later adversely affected when Sylvania lost market share to Texas Instruments. As of 1 January 1986 RTC la Radiotechnique-Compelec, Hyperelec and Cima became RTC-Compelec. Philips had a majority position in the new RTC. In 1988 it was renamed RTC-Philips Composants, and in 1990 Philips Composants. In 1992 this was split into Philips Composants and Philips Circuits Imprimes. In June 1998 Philips Composants, which specialized in manufacture of ceramics products, was sold to the Carbone Lorraine group and took the name Ferroxdure. In November 1998 the Aspocomp group of Finland purchased Philips circuits imprimés, which employed 550 people at the Évreux plant. The Évreux operation became Aspocomp, a 99% subsidiary of the Aspocomp group. Due to financial troubles the company first announced a severe layoff plan, then went bankrupt. On 20 June 2002 the judicial liquidation of the company Actions Simplifiées Aspocomp was announced by the Évreux District Court and all staff were dismissed.

== Brands ==
At first the trademark was an R with the outline of a transmitting tube as background. When the thoriated filament was introduced in 1923 the R was replaced by RT. In 1924 the company launched Super-Micro and Radio-Watt tubes. For a short period Radiotechnique used the "Doria" brand for American-style tubes. In 1927 the Dario trademark was adopted, but some tubes were marked as both RT and Dario. The Radiola brand appeared in 1922 for a receptor made by SFR. Later it was transferred to Radiotechnique and then to Philips in 1931. It gradually became a sub-brand of the Philips group before disappearing in 2002.

== Sources ==
- Base de données BASOL sur les sites et sols pollués (in French), Ministere de la Transition ecologique et solidaire
- Birks, J. B. (22 October 2013), The Theory and Practice of Scintillation Counting: International Series of Monographs in Electronics and Instrumentation, Elsevier Science, ISBN 978-1-4831-5606-4
- Caron, Francois; Erker, Paul; Fischer, Wolfram (1 January 1995), Innovations in the European Economy between the Wars, Walter de Gruyter, ISBN 978-3-11-088141-7
- Chambost, Emmanuel de (2012), La radioélectricité en France sous l'Occupation, Historiques (in French), l'Harmattan
- Chambost, Emmanuel (11 November 2012b), La Radiotechnique de Suresnes sous l'Occupation (in French)
- Gaspard, Françoise (1995), A Small City in France, Harvard University Press, ISBN 978-0-674-81097-6
- Gill, Jas; Swann, Peter (11 March 2002), Corporate Vision and Rapid Technological Change: The Evolution of Market Structure, Routledge, ISBN 978-1-134-87475-0
- "Histoire de Radiola 1922", 100 ans de radio (in French)
- "History of the manufacturer Radiola", Radiomuseum (in French)
- "La Radiotechnique (RT)", Radiomuseum (in French)
- Malerba, Franco (1985), The Semiconductor Business: The Economics of Rapid Growth and Decline, Univ of Wisconsin Press, ISBN 978-0-299-10460-3
- Muller, Franc (14 September 2014), Co-emploi et licenciement (in French)
- N° de pourvoi: 05-42551 (in French), Cour de cassation
- Parry, Claude (March–April 1963), "Un exemple de décentralisation industrielle : la dispersion des usines de " La Radiotechnique " à l'Ouest de Paris" (PDF), Annales de Géographie (in French), 72e Année (390), Armand Colin: 148–161, doi:10.3406/geo.1963.16372, JSTOR 23445391
- Porter, Michael E. (1983), Cases in Competitive Strategy, Simon and Schuster, ISBN 978-0-02-925410-3
- Science Applications, Inc. (October 1979), Characterization and Assessment of Potential European and Japanese Competition in Photovoltaics, US Department of Energy
- Société Ascopomp (Radiotechnique) (in French), Archives départementales de l'Eure
