= Société française radio-électrique =

French radiotelegraphic company

The Société française radio-électrique (SFR, Radiolectric French Company) was one of the first radiotelegraphic companies, founded by Émile Girardeau in 1910. It supported the conception and the production of the Radiola radio receivers, and the creation of the radio station of the same name.

It disappeared in 1957 after merging with Compagnie Générale de Télégraphie Sans Fil, later merged into Thomson-CSF.
