= Émile Girardeau =

French engineer

Émile Girardeau (12 October 1882 – 7 December 1970) was a French engineer, famous for being the first person to patent the original system of frequencies that is used and known today as radar. He was born in 1882 at Luçon, France (the Vendée).

In his early life he attended the École Polytechnique (Polytechnic School) (1902-1908) and became the Instructor at the École nationale des ponts et chaussées (National School of Bridges and Roads). By 1910, Girardeau established the first radiotelegraphic radio connection in tropical countries with Joseph Béthenod. The radio connection systems were designed for the Radioelectric French Company.

In 1919, Girardeau was promoted to Chevalier of the Legion of Honour for services in war. In 1922, Girardeau set in motion the idea for the creation of a public utility of information and music. Also in 1922, Girardeau helped establish the first private radio station in France, called RADIOLA, which at the end of March 1929 became Radio Paris. In 1931, Girardeau was promoted to Commander of the Legion of Honour.

In 1934, Girardeau headed the team which developed the first radar system in France. In 1939, Girardeau built with Maurice Ponte radar installations for the defence of Paris against planes (which were destroyed in June 1940). After the fall of France to Germany, Girardeau created a factory for underground forces of free France.

In 1944, Girardeau re-established radio communications in France. In 1945, Girardeau became a member of the Académie navale. In 1954, Girardeau became a member of the Académie des sciences morales et politiques. In 1970, Girardeau died in Paris.

== External links and references ==
- "Emile Girardeau". L'histoire du "radar ", les faits (tr. The history of the "radar", the facts)
