= Gustave-Auguste Ferrié =

French radio pioneer and army general

Gustave Ferrié
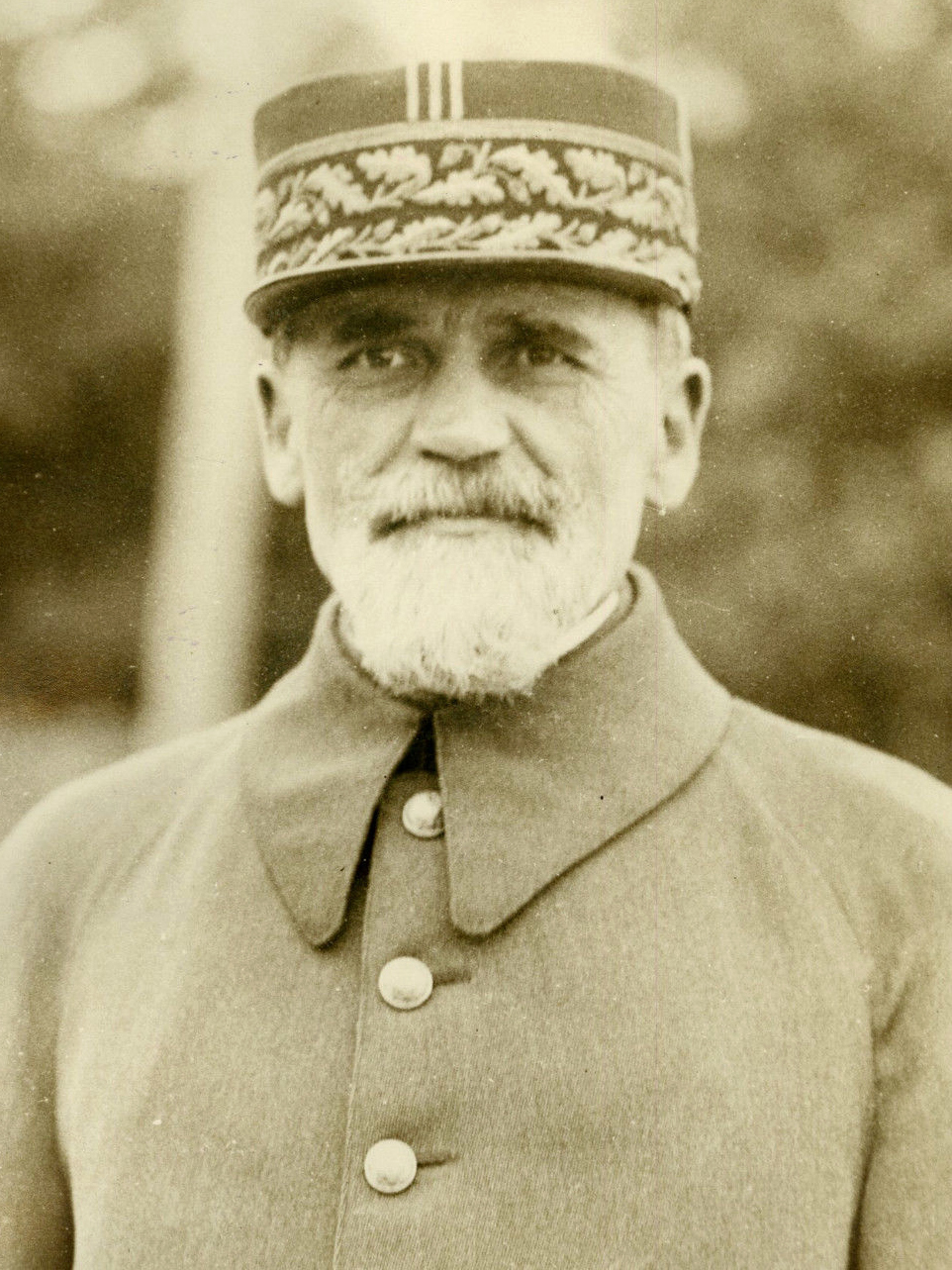
- Ferrié in 1932
- Born: 19 November 1868; Saint-Michel-de-Maurienne, France
- Died: 16 February 1932 (aged 63); Paris, France
- Known for: Electrolytic detector Radio communication TM (triode)
- Awards: Franklin Medal (1923); Prix Jules Janssen (1927); IEEE Medal of Honor (1931)
- Scientific career
- Fields: Electrical engineering

Gustave-Auguste Ferrié (19 November 1868 – 16 February 1932) was a French radio pioneer and army general.

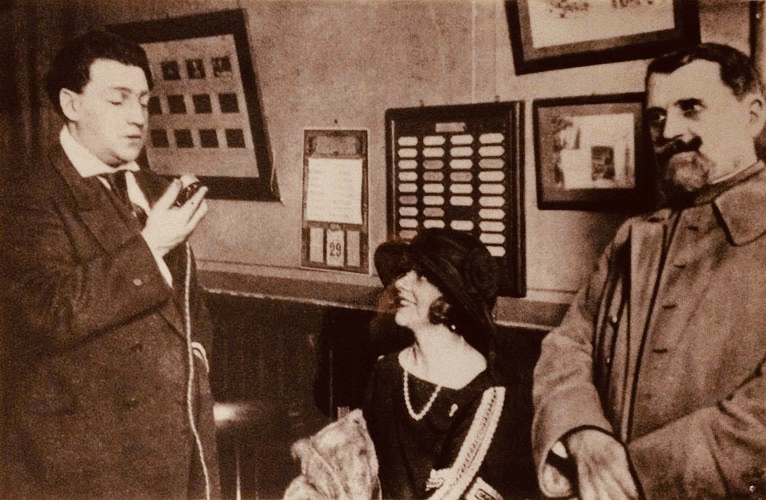
with Yvonne Printemps and Sacha Guitry

== Biography ==
=== Early years ===
Ferrié was born in Saint-Michel-de-Maurienne, Savoie. After having studied in the southern city of Draguignan, receiving the Claude Gay Prize, and graduating from the École Polytechnique in 1891, he became an officer in the French army's Engineers Corps, specialising in the military telegraph service. After being named to a committee exploring wireless telegraphy between France and England, in 1899 he carried out such communications in collaboration with Guglielmo Marconi.

He exposed his works on 22 August 1900, when the International congress of electricity was organised in Paris. His works had the title : “L'état actuel et les progrès de la télégraphie sans fil” (Current state and progress of wireless telegraphy).

In 1903 Ferrié invented a novel electrolytic detector, invented independently by Dr. Michael I. Pupin (1899), Professor Reginald A. Fessenden (1903), and W. Schloemilch (1903). That same year he also proposed setting aerials on the Eiffel Tower for long-range radiotelegraphy. Under his direction a transmitter was set up in the tower, and its effective range increased from an initial 400 km (250 mi) to 6,000 km (3,700 mi) by 1908. He then developed mobile transmitters for military units.

=== World War I ===
Ferrié headed the French Radiotelegraphie Militaire before and during World War I, where in 1914 he led two linked advances in military radio communications : practical ground telegraphy made feasible by the adoption of vacuum tubes within radio receivers. The transmitter was a buzzer, and the receiver an amplifier with triode. By the end of the war the French had produced almost 10,000 such sets.

Captain Paul Brenot headed the second group of Ferrié's Military Telegraphic Service. Members of the group included Henri Abraham, Maurice de Broglie, Paul Laüt and Lucien Lévy. Lévy was made head of the Eiffel Tower Military Radio Telegraphy laboratory in 1916.

=== Later career ===
Ferrié was made a General in 1919 and so remained until his death, having been exempted from retirement rules by a special law of 1930, and became general inspector of military telegraphy.

Ferrié was named a Fellow of the Institute of Radio Engineers in 1917, and in 1931 received its Medal of Honour for "his pioneer work in the building of radio communication in France and in the world, his long continued leadership in the communication field, and his outstanding contributions to the organisation of international cooperation in radio." He received on honorary doctorate from Oxford University in 1919, and in 1922 became a member of the French Academy of Sciences. He was the first president of the French National Committee of Geodesy and Géophysique (1920–1926), president of the International Scientific Radio Union (U.R.S.I.) and the International Commission on Longitudes by Radio, and vice president of the International Board of Scientific Unions. Ferrié was the president of the Société astronomique de France (SAF), the French astronomical society, from 1925–1927. In 1927, he received the Prix Jules Janssen, the highest award of SAF.

Ferrié died on 16 February 1932, at the Val-du-Grâce military hospital in Paris. Several hours after his death he was awarded the Grand Cross of the Legion of Honour.

Today the Espace Ferrié (Musée des Transmissions) continues his memory in Cesson-Sévigné. A college named "collège Ferrié" is located in Draguignan and in the 10th arrondissement of Paris.

== See also ==
- Carlos Ibáñez e Ibáñez de Ibero – 1st president of the International Committee for Weights and Measures

== Sources ==
- Electro-Science biography
- Espace Ferrié biography (French)
- IEEE History Center biography
- "Lucien LÉVY 1892–1965) In Memoriam" (PDF), Bulletin (in French) (48), Ecole Supérieure de Physique et de Chimie Industrielle de Paris, June 1966
- "Obituary: Gustave Ferrie", The Observatory, Vol. 55, p. 117–117, 1932.
- Photographs of commemorative monuments and plaques, Paris
