= Forthassa Gharbia =

- Location within Algeria
- Coordinates: 32.84177°N 1.24464°W
- Country: Algeria
- Province: Naâma
- Elevation: 1,426 m (4,678 ft)
- Time zone: GMT +1.0
- Postal code: 45201

Forthassa Gharbia (or Forthassa Rharbia) is a small settlement in western Algeria near the Moroccan border, to the west of Aïn Séfra. During the French colonial era it was important as a military post.

Forthassa Gharbia is a waterhole on the High Plateaux between the Tell and Saharan Atlas ranges. It lies slightly to the west of a line between Teniet el Sassi and the oasis of Ich, and therefore was technically within Moroccan territory, but in 1904 the boundary between Morocco and Algeria had not been delimited in this region, and there was no protest when the French occupied it. The French advance post at Forthassa Gharbia was established in March 1904 by Hubert Lyautey to ensure that the Beni Guil, a Moroccan tribe, accepted French rule. The post closed the dangerous pass of Jebel Grouz, cutting off the Beni Guil from their allies. By 1904 the pacification had mostly been achieved with little need for fighting.

For some time after establishing their protectorate over Morocco the French considered Forthassa Gharbia to be in Morocco, although the post was manned by Algerian troops. The troops collected the zekat tax on animals from the Beni Guil, a Moroccan tribe, in the name of the Moroccan government, and this money was used to maintain the post. However, eventually the French decided the post was in Algeria, drawing the boundary to the west of it.

A disaster occurred near Forthassa in January 1908. A company of legionnaires was marching from the fort at Berguent (Ras-el-Ain) to Forthassa. After several stages, they were caught in a storm with high winds and snow. Unable to erect their tents, they continued through the night. Ten men died of exhaustion. Others were frostbitten, and later their sores became infected by gangrene. By 5 February 37 of the men had died.

In February 1923 Governor-General Théodore Steeg of Algeria met in Algiers with his counterparts Marshal Hubert Lyautey of Morocco and Lucien Saint of Tunisia to discuss common problems. They agreed that the western Sahara must be treated as a whole, ignoring arbitrary boundaries. Nomadic migration across borders would be allowed but smuggling would not. A joint Algerian-Moroccan police force would operate from a base at Forthassa Rharbia. In practice, this agreement was not put into force.
