= Lyautey =

Lyautey is the name of:

- Hubert Lyautey, military governor and then Resident-General of then-French Morocco from 1907 through 1925
- Port-Lyautey, Morocco, named after Hubert Lyautey; now renamed Kenitra
- Place Lyautey, a prominent public square in Casablanca, Morocco
- Marechal Lyautey (ocean liner, 1924)
- Lyautey (ocean liner, 1952)
- Thorey-Lyautey, Meurthe-et-Moselle, France
- Mount Lyautey, a mountain in Alberta, Canada
