= Urbain Blanc =

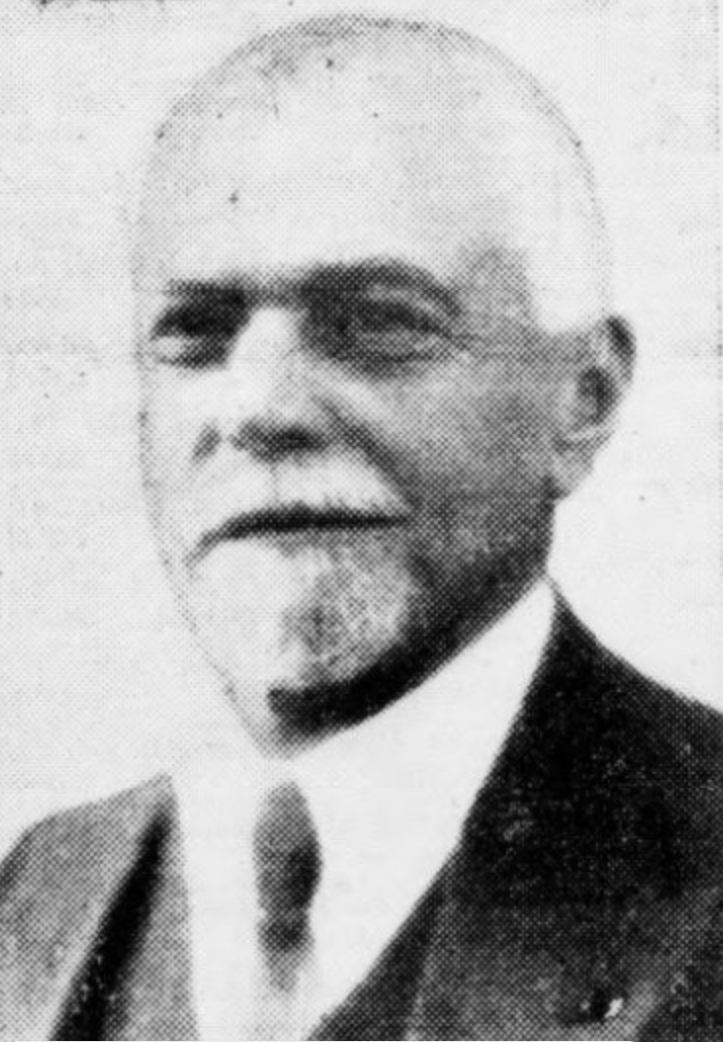
- Born: November 8, 1863

Urbain Blanc (1863–1943) was a French administrator and diplomat active in French colonial administrations in Morocco and Tunisia. Starting in 1919, he spent 15 years representing the French Ministry for Foreign Affairs as a senior administrator in Morocco, collaborating with résidents générals Hubert Lyautey, Théodore Steeg, Lucien Saint, and Henri Ponsot.

== Biography ==
Urbain Blanc was born November 8, 1863, in Saissac (Aude) in France and studied at the Lycée de Carcassonne. He began his career in 1889 as a redactor at the French Ministry of Interior. In 1893, he became the personal secretary to the minister of the interior, Alexandre Ribot. September 1, 1905, he was named inspector general of the Ministry of Interior's administrative services.

From 1906 to 1907, he was cabinet chief for Georges Clemenceau, then President of the Council of Ministers. On December 30, 1907, he joined the Ministry of Foreign Affairs and was named general secretary of the government in Tunisia.

On May 1, 1919, he was assigned to the French Résidence Générale in Morocco and was made general secretary of the French Protectorate. He would spend the rest of his career in his assignment to Morocco, collaborating with résidents générals Hubert Lyautey, Théodore Steeg, Lucien Saint, and Henri Ponsot, sometimes leading the French government in Morocco in interim periods.

In 1921, Blanc was named Minister Plenipotentiary. In 1932, he was made a commander in France's Legion of Honour. In 1926 he was made Minister Plenipotentiary, first class. In 1933 he was promoted to the grade of grand officer in the Legion of Honnor. He was also accorded the grand cordon of the Order of Ouissam Alaouite. He retired definitively February 1934.
