= Philippe La Beaume de Bourgoing =

French politician (1827–1882)

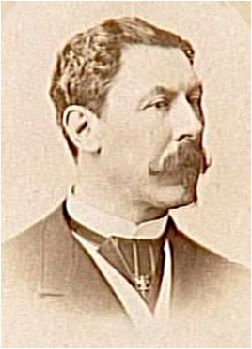

Philippe La Beaume de Bourgoing (1827–1882) was a French politician. He was the Grand Squire of France to Napoleon III, later serving as Inspector of the Haras Service before being elected five times as the Député for Nièvre in the French Parliament. Stemming from a noble family from the Nièvre, he became a Chevalier of the Légion d'Honneur in 1858, promoted to an officer in 1862.

His daughter Inès de Bourgoing gained fame as a pioneering nurse in Morocco.

The Baron died in Paris on 20 April 1882.
