= Lucien Saint =

French administrator and politician

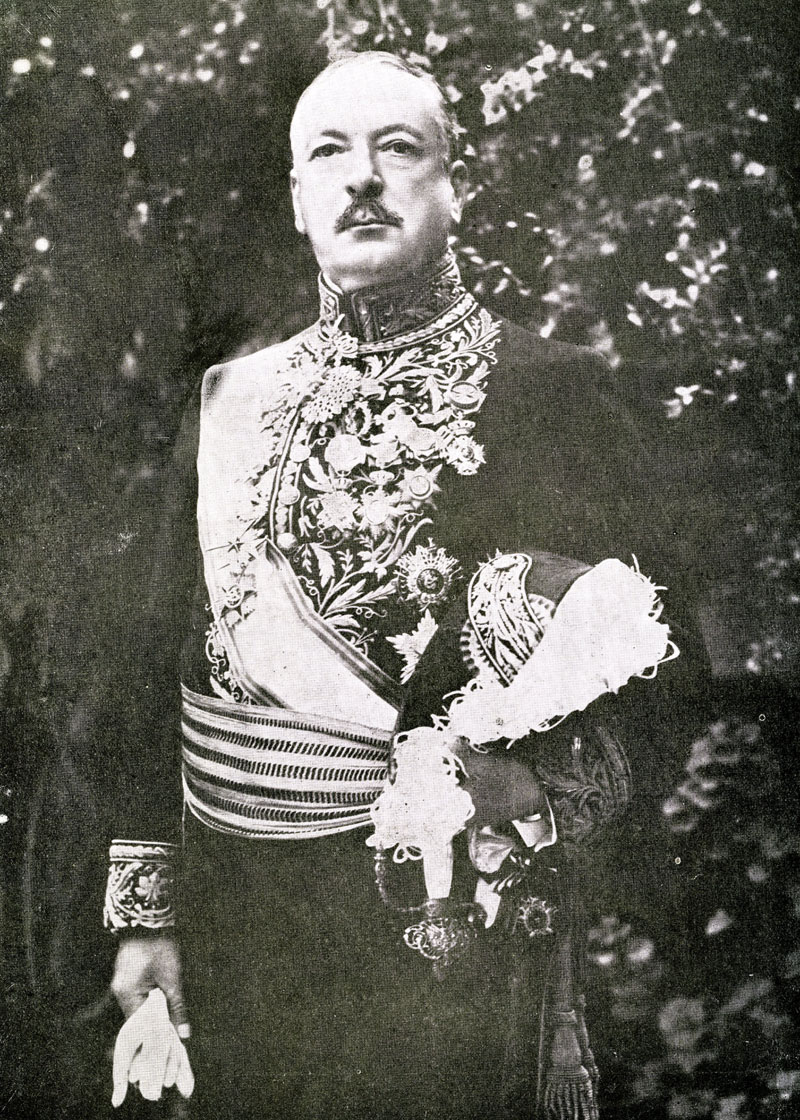
- Lucien Saint in 1930, in Meknes

Resident General in Tunisia
- In office 1 January 1921 – 2 January 1929
- Preceded by: Étienne Flandin
- Succeeded by: François Manceron

Resident General in Morocco
- In office 2 January 1929 – 29 July 1933
- Preceded by: Théodore Steeg
- Succeeded by: Auguste Henri Ponsot

Personal details
- Born: Lucien Charles Xavier Saint; 26 April 1867 Évreux, France
- Died: 24 February 1938 (aged 70) Bordeaux, Haute-Garonne, France
- Occupation: Colonial administrator

Lucien Saint (26 April 1867 – 24 February 1938) was a French administrator and politician.

== Early years ==
Lucien Charles Xavier Saint was born on 26 April 1867 in Évreux, Eure, where his father was a doctor. He obtained a law degree in Paris, and began his career as a lawyer before entering the prefectorial service in 1896 as a chief of staff. He was chief of staff of the prefecture of Aube, then sub-prefect of Rochefort. In 1902 he married the daughter of Georges Trouillot, the Minister of Commerce, and became chief of staff to his father-in-law. He was next chief of staff to the Minister Jean Cruppi. He was appointed prefect of Nièvre in 1906, then of Ille-et-Vilaine in 1909.

World War I (1914–1918) began in July 1914. In 1915 he was appointed Prefect of Toulouse, and in 1918 to Bouches-du-Rhône. In 1919 he was appointed by Georges Clemenceau to organize reconstruction of the Aisne department, which had been devastated by the war.

== Tunisia ==
Lucien Saint was appointed Minister Plenipotentiary first class and Resident General in the French protectorate of Tunisia from 1 January 1921 to 2 January 1929. He was responsible for creating four types of elected councils in Tunisia:

- Caïd councils, mainly reserved for Tunisians and given an advisory role in economic matters
- Regional Councils, composed of French and Tunisian members, with an advisory role in the economic sphere and responsible for distributing certain subsidies between caïdats and municipalities
- The Grand Council, with a French section and a Tunisian section, to examine the budget of the regency
- The arbitration committee of the Grand Council, which governed disputes between the two sections of the Grand Council.

These reforms created a degree of decentralization, and also a degree of association between the leading Tunisian and French figures.

== Morocco ==
Lucien Saint was appointed Resident General in Morocco from 2 January 1929 to 29 July 1933. In this capacity, he was committed to completing the work of Marshal Hubert Lyautey by extending the authority of the makhzen while completing French occupation of the territory. It was during his residency that one of the last bastions of Berber resistance in Morocco joined the makhzen, that of the Aït Atta refugees in Jbel Saghro led by Sheikh Assou Oubasslam. As resident general, Lucien Saint invited the sultan of Morocco, Moulay Mohammed (later Mohammed V), his grand vizier and his interpreter to Marignac on 26 July 1929 as part of their stay in Bagnères-de-Luchon, and their signatures in Arabic script are in the town's register.

== Later career ==
Lucien Saint became mayor of Marignac from 1933 to 1938. During the World War I, during one of his tours of prefect, he fell in love with the town and bought the property of Sacère. The name of Saint Lucien remains attached to an academic group that he brought to the commune in 1935. He was elected Senator of the Haute-Garonne on 10 January 1933. He joined the Democratic Left group, and sat on committees on Foreign Affairs, Colonies, Algeria and Air.

Saint died of heart disease on 24 February 1938 at his home of Sacère near Marignac. He was 71 years old. He is buried in the cemetery of Marignac. A speech that Édouard Daladier delivered in 1933 to honor him is inscribed on his stele.

== Awards ==
- Grand Officer of the Legion of Honor
- Cross of war
- Prefect Emeritus of the Haute-Garonne

== See also ==
- Urbain Blanc
