= Thorey-Lyautey =

- Commune
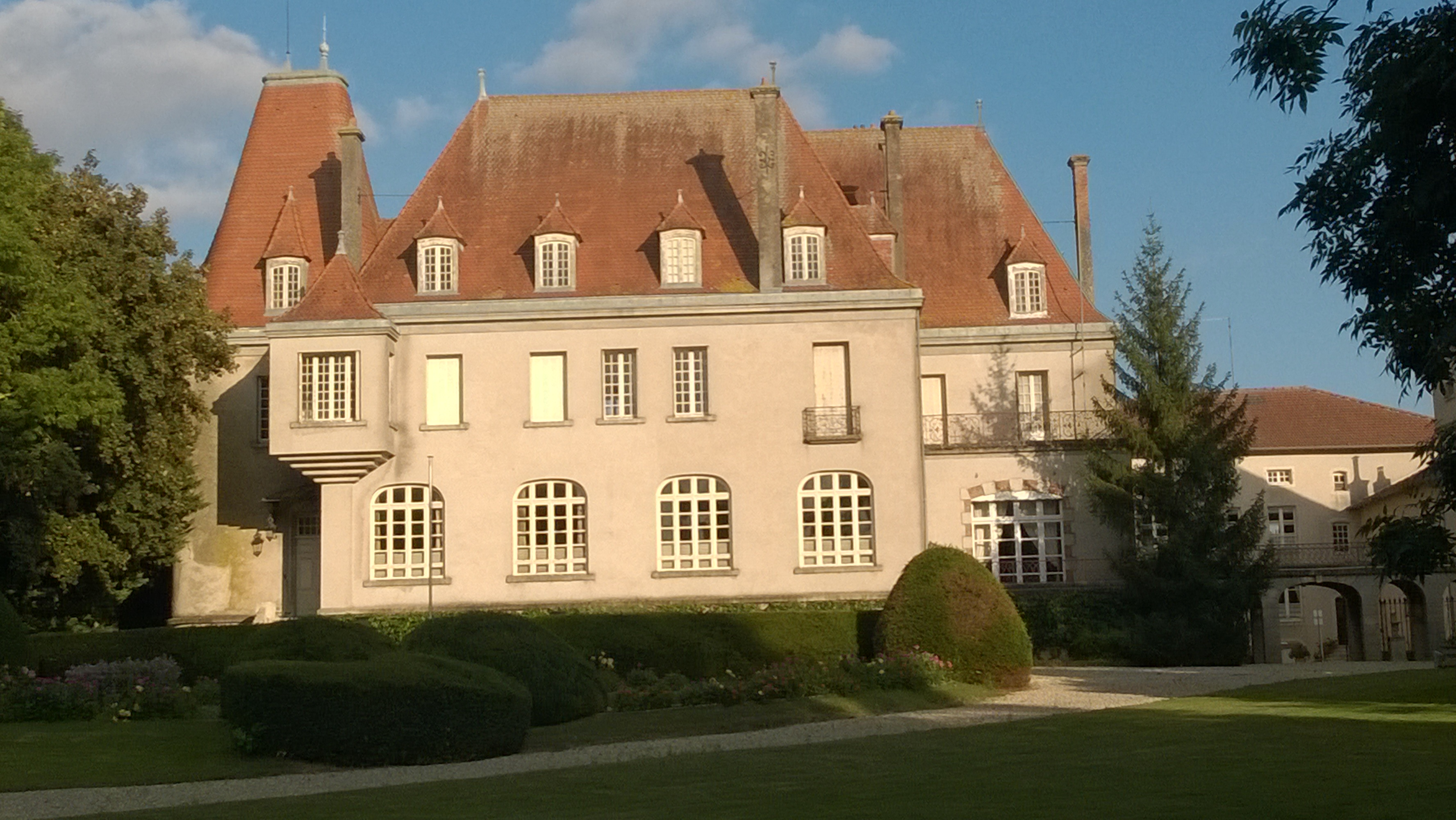
- The chateau in Thorey-Lyautey

- Coat of arms
- Location of Thorey-Lyautey
- Location within France Location within Grand Est
- Coordinates: 48°26′38″N 6°01′46″E
- Country: France
- Region: Grand Est
- Department: Meurthe-et-Moselle
- Arrondissement: Nancy
- Canton: Meine au Saintois

Government
  - Mayor (2020–2026): Philippe Lepape
- Area^{1}: 6.19 km^{2} (2.39 sq mi)
- Elevation: 300 m (980 ft)
- Highest elevation: 357 m (1,171 ft)
- Lowest elevation: 274 m (899 ft)
- Population (2023): 119
  - Density: 19.2/km^{2} (49.8/sq mi)
- Time zone: UTC+01:00 (CET)
  - Summer (DST): UTC+02:00 (CEST)
- INSEE/Postal code: 54522 /54115
- ^{1} French Land Register data, which excludes lakes, ponds, glaciers > 1 km^{2} (0.386 sq mi or 247 acres) and river estuaries.

Thorey-Lyautey (French pronunciation: [tɔʁɛ ljotɛ]) is a commune in the Meurthe-et-Moselle department in north-eastern France.

== Demographics ==
Historical population
Year	Pop.	±% p.a.
1968	115	—
1975	95	−2.69%
1982	81	−2.25%
1990	111	+4.02%
1999	118	+0.68%
2007	129	+1.12%
2012	138	+1.36%
2017	143	+0.71%
2023	119	−3.02%
Source: INSEE

== See also ==
- Communes of the Meurthe-et-Moselle department
