= Minister of Transport (France) =

Cabinet member in the Government of France

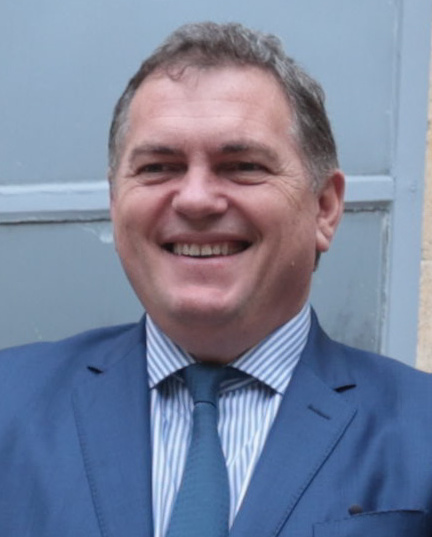
Philippe Tabarot has been Minister for Transport since 23 December 2024.

The Minister of Transport (French: Ministre des Transports) is a cabinet member in the Government of France.

The position was created in 1870 as a modification to the position of Minister of Public Works (Ministre des Travaux Publics), which had been established in 1830. It has frequently been combined with the position of Minister of Infrastructure (Ministre de l'Équipement), Minister of Housing (Ministre du Logement), Minister of Tourism (Ministre du Tourisme), Minister of Territorial Development (Ministre de l'Aménagement du territoire), as well as Minister of the Sea (Ministre de la Mer). Following the election of Nicolas Sarkozy as President of France in 2007, the Ministry of Transport, Public Works, Tourism and the Sea was absorbed by the Ministry of Ecology and Sustainable and Territorial Development.

The position holder in the Borne, Attal, and Barnier governments held the title of minister delegate (Ministre délégué aux Transports).

== Ministers of Transport (or equivalent) since 1870 ==
- 23 December 2024 – present: Philippe Tabarot
- 21 September 2024 – 23 December 2024: François Durovray
- 8 February 2024 – 21 September 2024: Patrice Vergriete
- 4 July 2022 – 11 January 2024: Clément Beaune
- 3 September 2019 – 16 May 2022: Jean-Baptiste Djebbari (Secretary of State for Transport, Minister Delegate for Transport from 6 July 2020)
- 17 May 2017 – 16 July 2019: Élisabeth Borne (Minister for Transport)
- 26 August 2014 – 10 May 2017: Alain Vidalies
- 16 May 2012 – 25 August 2014: Frédéric Cuvillier (Minister Delegate for Transport and the Maritime Economy, Minister Delegate for Transport, the Sea and Fisheries from 21 June 2012, Secretary of State for Transport, the Sea and Fisheries from 2 April 2014)
- 14 November 2010 – 10 May 2012: Thierry Mariani (Minister for Transport from 29 June 2011)
- 15 May 2007 – 13 November 2010: Dominique Bussereau (Secretary of State for Transport)
- 2 June 2005 – 15 May 2007: Dominique Perben
- 7 May 2002 – 2 June 2005: Gilles de Robien
- 4 June 1997 – 7 May 2002: Jean-Claude Gayssot
- 18 May 1995 – 4 June 1997: Bernard Pons
- 29 March 1993 – 18 May 1995: Bernard Bosson
- 2 April 1992 – 29 March 1993: Jean-Louis Bianco
- 15 May 1991 – 2 April 1992: Paul Quilès
- 21 December 1990 – 15 May 1991: Louis Besson
- 23 June 1988 – 21 December 1990: Michel Delebarre
- 10 May 1988 – 23 June 1988: Louis Mermaz
- 20 March 1986 – 10 May 1988: Pierre Méhaignerie
- 20 September 1985 – 20 March 1986: Jean Auroux
- 17 July 1984 – 20 September 1985: Paul Quilès
- 22 June 1981 – 17 July 1984: Charles Fiterman
- 21 May 1981 – 22 June 1981: Louis Mermaz
- 2 October 1980 – 21 May 1981: Daniel Hoeffel
- 3 April 1978 – 2 October 1980: Joël Le Theule
- 2 April 1973 – 27 February 1974: Yves Guéna
- 5 July 1972 – 2 April 1973: Robert Galley
- 7 January 1971 – 5 July 1972: Jean Chamant
- 22 June 1969 – 31 December 1970: Raymond Mondon
- 6 April 1967 – 22 June 1969: Jean Chamant
- 28 November 1962 – 6 April 1967: Marc Jacquet
- 15 May 1962 – 28 November 1962: Roger Dusseaulx
- 9 June 1958 – 15 May 1962: Robert Buron
- 3 June 1958 – 9 June 1958: Antoine Pinay
- 13 June 1957 – 1 June 1958: Édouard Bonnefous
- 23 February 1955 – 1 February 1956: Édouard Corniglion-Molinier
- 3 September 1954 – 23 February 1955: Jacques Chaban-Delmas
- 14 August 1954 – 3 September 1954: Maurice Bourgès-Maunoury
- 19 June 1954 – 14 August 1954: Jacques Chaban-Delmas
- 28 June 1953 – 19 June 1954: Jacques Chastellain
- 8 March 1952 – 28 June 1953: André Morice
- 12 July 1950 – 8 March 1952: Antoine Pinay
- 2 July 1950 – 12 July 1950: Maurice Bourgès-Maunoury
- 7 February 1950 – 2 July 1950: Jacques Chastellain
- 11 September 1948 – 7 February 1950: Christian Pineau
- 5 September 1948 – 11 September 1948: Henri Queuille
- 24 November 1947 – 5 September 1948: Christian Pineau
- 21 November 1945 – 24 November 1947: Jules Moch
- 10 September 1944 – 21 November 1945: René Mayer
- 9 November 1943 – 10 September 1944: René Mayer (commissioner)
- 27 June 1940 – 12 July 1940: Ludovic-Oscar Frossard
- 16 June 1940 – 27 June 1940: Ludovic-Oscar Frossard
- 5 June 1940 – 16 June 1940: Ludovic-Oscar Frossard
- 23 August 1938 – 5 June 1940: Anatole de Monzie
- 10 April 1938 – 23 August 1938: Ludovic-Oscar Frossard
- 13 March 1938 – 10 April 1938: Jules Moch
- 22 June 1937 – 13 March 1938: Henri Queuille
- 4 June 1936 – 22 June 1937: Albert Bedouce
- 24 January 1936 – 4 June 1936: Camille Chautemps
- 7 June 1935 – 24 January 1936: Laurent Eynac
- 1 June 1935 – 7 June 1935: Joseph Paganon
- 8 November 1934 – 1 June 1935: Henri Roy
- 9 February 1934 – 8 November 1934: Pierre Étienne Flandin
- 31 January 1933 – 9 February 1934: Joseph Paganon
- 18 December 1932 – 31 January 1933: Georges Bonnet
- 3 June 1932 – 18 December 1932: Édouard Daladier
- 20 February 1932 – 3 June 1932: Charles Guernier
- 27 January 1931 – 20 February 1932: Maurice Deligne
- 13 December 1930 – 27 January 1931: Édouard Daladier
- 2 December 1930 – 13 December 1930: Georges Pernot
- 21 February 1930 – 2 March 1930: Édouard Daladier
- 3 November 1929 – 21 February 1930: Georges Pernot
- 11 November 1928 – 3 November 1929: Pierre Forgeot
- 23 July 1926 – 11 November 1928: André Tardieu
- 19 July 1926 – 23 July 1926: Orly André-Hesse
- 23 June 1926 – 19 July 1926: Charles Daniel-Vincent
- 29 October 1925 – 23 June 1926: Anatole de Monzie
- 17 April 1925 – 29 October 1925: Pierre Laval
- 14 June 1924 – 17 April 1925: Victor Peytral
- 29 March 1924 – 14 June 1924: Yves Le Trocquer
- 20 January 1920 – 29 March 1924: Yves Le Trocquer
- 5 May 1919 – 20 January 1920: Albert Claveille
- 12 September 1917 – 5 May 1919: Albert Claveille
- 20 March 1917 – 12 September 1917: Georges Desplas
- 12 December 1916 – 20 March 1917: Édouard Herriot
- 26 August 1914 – 12 December 1916: Marcel Sembat
- 13 June 1914 – 26 August 1914: René Renoult
- 9 June 1914 – 13 June 1914: Jean Dupuy
- 9 December 1913 – 9 June 1914: Fernand David
- 22 March 1913 – 9 December 1913: Joseph Thierry
- 14 January 1912 – 22 March 1913: Jean Dupuy
- 27 June 1911 – 14 January 1912: Victor Augagneur
- 2 March 1911 – 27 June 1911: Charles Dumont
- 3 November 1910 – 2 March 1911: Louis Puech
- 24 July 1909 – 3 November 1910: Alexandre Millerand
- 14 March 1906 – 24 July 1909: Louis Barthou
- 24 January 1905 – 14 March 1906: Armand Gauthier de l'Aude
- 7 June 1902 – 24 January 1905: Émile Maruéjouls
- 22 June 1899 – 7 June 1902: Pierre Baudin
- 6 May 1899 – 22 June 1899: Jean Monestier
- 1 November 1898 – 6 May 1899: Camille Krantz
- 17 September 1898 – 1 November 1898: Jules Godin
- 28 June 1898 – 17 September 1898: Louis Tillaye
- 29 April 1896 – 28 June 1898: Adolphe Turrel
- 1 November 1895 – 29 April 1896: Edmond Guyot-Dessaigne
- 26 January 1895 – 1 November 1895: Ludovic Dupuy-Dutemps
- 30 May 1894 – 13 January 1895: Louis Barthou
- 3 December 1893 – 30 May 1894: Charles Jonnart
- 27 February 1892 – 3 December 1893: Jules Viette
- 22 February 1889 – 27 February 1892: Yves Guyot
- 3 April 1888 – 22 February 1889: Pierre Deluns-Montaud
- 12 December 1887 – 3 April 1888: Émile Loubet
- 30 May 1887 – 12 December 1887: Severiano de Heredia
- 4 November 1886 – 30 May 1887: Édouard Millaud
- 7 January 1886 – 2 November 1886: Charles Baïhaut
- 16 April 1885 – 7 January 1886: Charles Demôle
- 6 April 1885 – 16 April 1885: Sadi Carnot
- 21 February 1883 – 6 April 1885: David Raynal
- 10 August 1882 – 21 February 1883: Anne Charles Hérisson
- 30 January 1882 – 7 August 1882: Henri Varroy
- 14 November 1881 – 30 January 1882: David Raynal
- 23 September 1880 – 14 November 1881: Sadi Carnot
- 28 December 1879 – 23 September 1880: Henri Varroy
- 13 December 1877 – 28 December 1879: Charles Louis de Saulces de Freycinet
- 23 November 1877 – 13 December 1877: Michel Graëff
- 17 May 1877 – 23 November 1877: Auguste Pâris
- 9 March 1876 – 17 May 1877: Albert Christophle
- 22 May 1874 – 9 March 1876: Eugène Caillaux
- 26 November 1873 – 22 May 1874: Roger de Larcy
- 25 May 1873 – 26 November 1873: Alfred Deseilligny
- 18 May 1873 – 25 May 1873: René Bérenger
- 7 December 1872 – 18 May 1873: Oscar Bardi de Fourtou
- 19 February 1871 – 7 December 1872: Roger de Larcy
- 4 September 1870 – 19 February 1871: Pierre Frédéric Dorian

== See also ==
- Minister of the Sea (France)
