= Minister of Public Works (France) =

The Minister of Public Works (French: Ministre de l'Equipement) was a cabinet member in the Government of France. Formerly known as "Ministre des Travaux Publics" (1830–1870), in 1870, it was largely subsumed by the position of Minister of Transportation. Since the 1960s, the positions of Minister of Public Works has reappeared, often linked with Minister of Housing ("Logement"). It has also been linked to Minister of Transportation, Minister of Tourism, Minister of Territorial Development ("Aménagement du territoire") and Minister of the Sea.

== Minister of Public Works ("Travaux Publics") (1830–1870) ==
Start	End	Officeholder
19 May 1830	31 July 1830	Guillaume Antoine Benoît, baron Cappelle
31 July 1830	1 August 1830	Achille Charles Léonce Victor, duc de Broglie
13 March 1831	31 December 1832	Antoine, comte d'Argout
31 December 1832	4 April 1834	Adolphe Thiers
22 February 1836	6 September 1836	Hippolyte Passy
19 September 1836	31 March 1839	Nicolas Martin du Nord
31 March 1839	12 May 1839	Adrien de Gasparin
12 May 1839	1 March 1840	Jules Armand Dufaure
1 March 1840	29 October 1840	Hippolyte François Jaubert
29 October 1840	16 December 1840	Jean-Baptiste Teste
16 December 1840	9 May 1847	Pierre Sylvain Dumon
9 May 1847	24 February 1848	Hippolyte Paul Jayr
24 February 1848	11 May 1848	Alexandre Marie
11 May 1848	28 June 1848	Ulysse Trélat
28 June 1848	13 October 1848	Adrien Recurt
13 October 1848	20 December 1848	Alexandre-François Vivien
20 December 1848	29 December 1848	Léon Faucher
29 December 1848	31 October 1849	Théobald de Lacrosse
31 October 1849	9 January 1851	Jean Bineau
9 January 1851	26 October 1851	Pierre Magne
26 October 1851	3 December 1851	Théobald de Lacrosse
3 December 1851	25 January 1852	Pierre Magne
25 January 1852	28 July 1852	Noël Jacques Lefebvre-Duruflé
28 July 1852	3 February 1855	Pierre Magne
3 February 1855	23 June 1863	Eugène Rouher
23 June 1863	20 January 1867	Armand Béhic
20 January 1867	17 December 1868	Adolphe Forcade La Roquette
17 December 1868	2 January 1870	Edmond Valléry Gressier
2 January 1870	15 May 1870	Auguste Élisabeth Joseph Bonamour, marquis de Talhouët
15 May 1870	10 August 1870	Charles Ignace Plichon
10 August 1870	4 September 1870	Jérôme Frédéric Paul, baron David

== Minister of Public Works ==
Between 25 October 1906 and 22 March 1913 the Ministry of Public Works was combined with the Ministry of Posts and Telegraphs to form the Ministry of Public Works, Posts and Telegraphs. Posts and Telegraphs was then transferred to the Ministry of Commerce and Industry. Ministers of public works after this included:

Start	End	Officeholder	Notes
22 March 1913	9 December 1913	Joseph Thierry	Cabinet of Louis Barthou
9 December 1913	9 June 1914	Fernand David	First cabinet of Gaston Doumergue
9 June 1914	13 June 1914	Jean Dupuy	Fourth cabinet of Alexandre Ribot
13 June 1914	26 August 1914	René Renoult	First cabinet of René Viviani
26 August 1914	29 October 1915	Marcel Sembat	Second cabinet of René Viviani
29 October 1915	12 December 1916	Marcel Sembat	Fifth cabinet of Aristide Briand
12 December 1916	20 March 1917	Édouard Herriot	Sixth cabinet of Aristide Briand. Supply, Public Works, and Transport
20 March 1917	12 September 1917	Georges Desplas	Fifth cabinet of Alexandre Ribot. Public Works and Transport
12 September	16 November 1917	Albert Claveille	First cabinet of Paul Painlevé. Public Works and Transport
16 November 1917	20 January 1920	Albert Claveille	Second cabinet of Georges Clemenceau. Public Works and Transport
20 January 1920	24 September 1920	Yves Le Trocquer	Cabinet of Alexandre Millerand. Public Works
24 September 1920	16 January 1921	Yves Le Trocquer	Cabinet of Georges Leygues. Public Works
16 January 1921	15 January 1922	Yves Le Trocquer	Seventh cabinet of Aristide Briand. Public Works
15 January 1922	29 March 1924	Yves Le Trocquer	Second cabinet of Raymond Poincaré. Public Works
29 March 1924	9 June 1924	Yves Le Trocquer	Third cabinet of Raymond Poincaré. Public Works, Ports, and Marine
17 April	29 October 1925	Pierre Laval	Second cabinet of Paul Painlevé
29 October 1925	28 November 1925	Anatole de Monazie	Third cabinet of Paul Painlevé
28 November 1925	23 June 1926	Anatole de Monzie	Eighth and ninth cabinets of Aristide Briand. Public Works
23 June 1926	19 July 1926	Charles Daniel-Vincent	Tenth cabinet of Aristide Briand. Public Works
23 July 1926	11 November 1928	André Tardieu	Fourth cabinet of Raymond Poincaré. Public Works
11 November 1928	29 July 1929	Pierre Forgeot	Fifth cabinet of Raymond Poincaré. Public Works
29 July 1929	3 November 1929	Pierre Forgeot	Eleventh cabinet of Aristide Briand. Public Works
3 November 1929	21 February 1930	Georges Pernot	First cabinet of André Tardieu
21 February 1930	2 March 1930	Édouard Daladier	First cabinet of Camille Chautemps
2 March 1930	13 December 1930	Georges Pernot	Second cabinet of André Tardieu
13 December 1930	22 January 1931	Édouard Daladier	Cabinet of Théodore Steeg
27 January 1931	6 February 1932	Maurice Deligne	First, second and third cabinets of Pierre Laval
20 February 1932	3 June 1932	Charles Guernier	Third cabinet of André Tardieu. Public Works and Merchant Marine
3 June 1932	14 December 1932	Édouard Daladier	Third cabinet of Édouard Herriot
18 December 1932	28 January 1933	Georges Bonnet	Cabinet of Joseph Paul-Boncour
31 January 1933	24 October 1933	Joseph Paganon	First cabinet of Édouard Daladier
26 October 1933	24 November 1933	Joseph Paganon	First cabinet of Albert Sarraut
26 November 1933	30 January 1934	Joseph Paganon	Second cabinet of Camille Chautemps
9 February 1934	8 November 1934	Pierre-Étienne Flandin	Second cabinet of Gaston Doumergue
8 November 1934	31 May 1935	Henri Roy	First cabinet of Pierre-Étienne Flandin
1 June 1935	4 June 1935	Joseph Paganon	Cabinet of Fernand Bouisson
7 June 1935	22 January 1936	Laurent Eynac	Fourth cabinet of Pierre Laval
24 January 1936	4 June 1936	Camille Chautemps	Second cabinet of Albert Sarraut
4 June 1936	21 June 1937	Albert Bedouce	First cabinet of Léon Blum
22 June 1937	18 January 1938	Henri Queuille	Third cabinet of Camille Chautemps
18 January 1938	13 March 1938	Henri Queuille	Fourth cabinet of Camille Chautemps

== Minister of Public Works ("Equipement") (1966–2005) ==
The following is a list of all Ministers of Public Works (Ministre de l'Equipement) from 1966 onward:

- 8 January 1966 – 28 April 1967 : Edgard Pisani (Ministre de l’Equipement et du Logement)
- 28 April 1967 – 30 May 1968 : François-Xavier Ortoli (Ministre de l’Equipement et du Logement)
- 31 May – 10 July 1968 : Robert Galley (Ministre de l’Equipement et du Logement)
- 10 July 1968 – 5 July 1972 : Albin Chalandon (Ministre de l’Equipement et du Logement)
- 5 July 1972 – 28 May 1974 : Olivier Guichard (Ministre de l'Equipement, du Logement et de l'Aménagement du Territoire; Aménagement du Territoire, de l'Equipement, du Logement et du Tourisme; Ministre d'Etat à l'Aménagement du Territoire, à l'Equipement et aux Transports)
- 28 May 1974 – 25 August 1976 : Robert Galley (Ministre de l’Equipement)
- 25 August 1976 – 26 September 1977 : Jean-Pierre Fourcade (Ministre de l’Equipement; Ministre de l’Equipement et de l’Aménagement du Territoire (27 March 1977))
- 26 September 1977 – 21 May 1981 : Fernand Icart (Ministre de l’Equipement et de l’Aménagement du Territoire)
- 21 May 1981 – 22 June 1981 : Louis Mermaz (Ministre de l’Equipement et des Transports)
- 20 March 1986 – 10 May 1988 : Pierre Méhaignerie (Ministre de l'Equipement, du Logement, de l'Aménagement du Territoire et des Transports)
- 10 May 1988 – 22 February 1989 : Maurice Faure (Ministre de l'Equipement, du Logement)
- 22 February 1989 – 21 December 1990 : Michel Delebarre (Ministre de l'Equipement, du Logement, des Transports et de la Mer)
- 21 December 1990 – 15 May 1991 : Louis Besson (Ministre délégué auprès du Ministre de l'Equipement, du Logement, des Transports et de la Mer)
- 15 May 1991 – 2 April 1992 : Paul Quilès (Ministre de l'Equipement, du Logement, des Transports et de l'Espace)
- 2 April 1992 – 29 March 1993 : Jean-Louis Bianco (Ministre de l'équipement, du logement et des transports)
- 29 March 1993 – 18 May 1995 : Bernard Bosson (Ministre de l'équipement, des transports et du tourisme)
- 18 May 1995 – 4 June 1997 : Bernard Pons (Ministre de l'Aménagement du Territoire, de l'Equipement et des Transports)
- 4 June 1997 – 7 May 2002 : Jean-Claude Gayssot (Ministre de l'Equipement, des Transports et du Logement)
- 7 May 2002 – 2 June 2005 : Gilles de Robien
- 2 June 2005 – 2007 : Dominique Perben as Minister of Transportation, Public Works, Tourism and the Sea
