= Paul Reynaud =

French politician and lawyer (1878–1966)

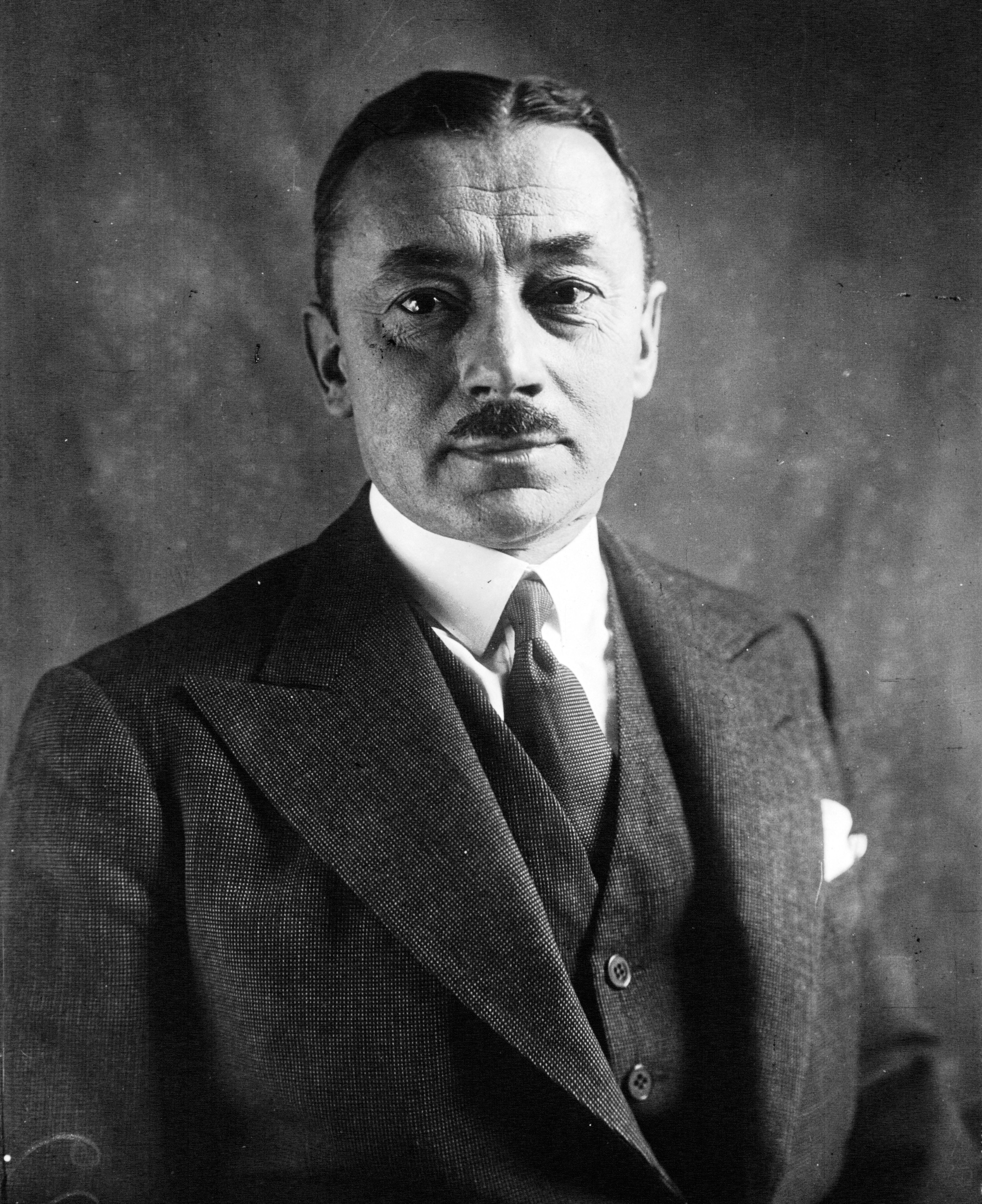
- Reynaud in 1933

Prime Minister of France
- In office 21 March – 16 June 1940
- President: Albert Lebrun
- Deputy: Philippe Pétain
- Preceded by: Édouard Daladier
- Succeeded by: Philippe Pétain

Deputy Prime Minister of France
- In office 28 June 1953 – 12 June 1954
- Prime Minister: Joseph Laniel
- Preceded by: Henri Queuille
- Succeeded by: Guy Mollet
- In office 20 February – 10 May 1932
- Prime Minister: André Tardieu
- Preceded by: Lucien Hubert
- Succeeded by: Albert Dalimier

Minister responsible for Relations with Partner States and the Far East
- In office 2–4 July 1950
- Prime Minister: Henri Queuille
- Preceded by: Position established
- Succeeded by: Jean Letourneau

Minister of Finance and Economic Affairs
- In office 26 July – 28 August 1948
- Prime Minister: André Marie
- Preceded by: René Mayer
- Succeeded by: Christian Pineau

Minister of Foreign Affairs
- In office 5–16 June 1940
- Prime Minister: Himself
- Preceded by: Édouard Daladier
- Succeeded by: Philippe Pétain
- In office 21 March – 18 May 1940
- Prime Minister: Himself
- Preceded by: Édouard Daladier
- Succeeded by: Édouard Daladier

Minister of National Defence and War
- In office 18 May – 16 June 1940
- Prime Minister: Himself
- Preceded by: Édouard Daladier
- Succeeded by: Maxime Weygand

Minister of Finance
- In office 1 November 1938 – 21 March 1940
- Prime Minister: Édouard Daladier
- Preceded by: Paul Marchandeau
- Succeeded by: Lucien Lamoureux
- In office 2 March – 4 December 1930
- Prime Minister: André Tardieu
- Preceded by: Charles Dumont
- Succeeded by: Louis Germain-Martin

Minister of Justice
- In office 12 April – 1 November 1938
- Prime Minister: Édouard Daladier
- Preceded by: Marc Rucart
- Succeeded by: Paul Marchandeau
- In office 20 February – 3 June 1932
- Prime Minister: André Tardieu
- Preceded by: Léon Bérard
- Succeeded by: René Renoult

Minister of the Colonies
- In office 27 February 1931 – 6 February 1932
- Prime Minister: Pierre Laval
- Preceded by: Théodore Steeg
- Succeeded by: Louis de Chappedelaine

Personal details
- Born: Jean Paul Reynaud; 15 October 1878 Barcelonnette, Basses-Alpes, France
- Died: 21 September 1966 (aged 87) Neuilly-sur-Seine, France
- Party: Democratic Republican Alliance (1901–1949); National Centre of Independents and Peasants (1949–1966)
- Spouse(s): Jeanne Henri-Robert (1912–1949); Christiane Mabire (1949–1966)
- Domestic partner: Hélène de Portes
- Children: 4
- Education: HEC Paris

Paul Reynaud (French: [pɔl ʁɛno]; 15 October 1878 – 21 September 1966) was a French politician and lawyer prominent in the interwar period, noted for his economic liberalism and vocal opposition to Nazi Germany.

Reynaud opposed the Munich Agreement of September 1938, when France and the United Kingdom gave way before Hitler's proposals for the dismemberment of Czechoslovakia. After the outbreak of World War II, Reynaud became the penultimate Prime Minister of the Third Republic in March 1940. He was also vice-president of the Democratic Republican Alliance center-right party. Reynaud was Prime Minister during the German defeat of France in May and June 1940; he persistently refused to support an armistice with Germany and unsuccessfully attempted to save France from German occupation in World War II, and resigned on 16 June.

After unsuccessfully attempting to flee France, he was arrested by Philippe Pétain's administration. Surrendering to German custody in 1942, he was imprisoned in Germany and later Austria until liberation in 1945, where he was released after the Battle of Itter Castle in which one of the leaders, German Major Josef Gangl, declared a hero by the Austrian resistance, took a sniper's bullet to save Reynaud.

Elected to the National Assembly in 1946, he became a prominent figure again in French political life, serving in several cabinet positions. He favoured a United States of Europe, and participated in drafting the constitution for the Fifth Republic, but resigned from government in 1962 after disagreement with President de Gaulle over changes to the electoral system.

== Early life and politics ==
Reynaud was born in Barcelonnette, Alpes-de-Haute-Provence, the son of Alexandre and Amelie (née Gassier) Reynaud. His father had made a fortune in the textile industry, enabling Reynaud to study law at the Sorbonne. He entered politics and was elected to the French Chamber of Deputies from 1919 to 1924, representing Basses-Alpes, and again from 1928, representing a Paris district. Although he was first elected as part of the conservative "Blue Horizon" bloc in 1919, Reynaud shortly thereafter switched his allegiance to the centre-right Democratic Republican Alliance party, later becoming its vice-president.

In the 1920s, Reynaud developed a reputation for laxity on German reparations, at a time when many in the French government backed harsher terms for Germany. In the 1930s during the Great Depression, particularly after 1933, Reynaud's stance hardened against the Germans at a time when all nations were struggling economically. Reynaud backed a strong alliance with the United Kingdom and, unlike many others on the French Right, better relations with the Soviet Union as a counterweight against the Germans.

Reynaud held several cabinet posts in the early 1930s, but he clashed with members of his party after 1932 over French foreign and defense policy. In June 1934, Reynaud defended in the Chamber of Deputies the need to devalue the French franc, whose belonging to the gold standard was increasingly harmful for the French economy, but in those years French public opinion was opposed to any devaluation.

He was not given another cabinet position until 1938. Like Winston Churchill, Reynaud was a maverick in his party and often alone in his calls for rearmament and resistance to German aggrandizement. Reynaud was a supporter of Charles de Gaulle's theories of mechanized warfare in contrast to the static defense doctrines that were in vogue among many of his countrymen, symbolized by the Maginot Line. He strongly opposed appeasement in the run-up to the Second World War. He also clashed with his party on economic policy, backing the devaluation of the franc as a solution to France's economic woes. Pierre Étienne Flandin, the leader of the Democratic Republican Alliance, agreed with several of Reynaud's key policy stances, particularly on Reynaud's defence of economic liberalism. The franc was devalued, in a range between 25% and 34%, by the Popular Front government presided by Leon Blum on 1 October 1936.

== Return to government ==
Reynaud returned to the cabinet in 1938 as Minister of Justice under Édouard Daladier. The Sudeten Crisis, which began not long after Reynaud was named Minister of Justice, again revealed the divide between Reynaud and the rest of the Alliance Démocratique; Reynaud adamantly opposed abandoning the Czechs to the Germans, while Flandin felt that allowing Germany to expand eastward would inevitably lead to a conflict with the Soviets that would weaken both. Reynaud publicly made his case, and in response Flandin pamphleted Paris in order to pressure the government to agree to Hitler's demands. Reynaud subsequently left his party to become an independent. However, Reynaud still had the support of Daladier, whose politique de fermeté ("policy of firmness") was very similar to Reynaud's notion of deterrence.

Reynaud, however, had always wanted the Finance ministry. He endorsed radically liberal economic policies in order to draw France's economy out of stagnation, centered on a massive program of deregulation, including the elimination of the forty-hour work week. The notion of deregulation was very popular among France's businessmen, and Reynaud believed that it was the best way for France to regain investors' confidence again and escape the stagnation its economy had fallen into. The collapse of Léon Blum's government in 1938 was a response to Blum's attempt to expand the regulatory powers of the French government; there was therefore considerable support in the French government for an alternative approach like Reynaud's.

Paul Marchandeau, Daladier's first choice for finance minister, offered a limited program of economic reform that was not to Daladier's satisfaction; Reynaud and Marchandeau swapped portfolios, and Reynaud went ahead with his radical liberalization reforms. Reynaud's reforms were implemented, and the government faced down a one-day strike in opposition. Reynaud addressed France's business community, arguing that "We live in a capitalist system. For it to function we must obey its laws. These are the laws of profits, individual risk, free markets, and growth by competition." With Reynaud as Minister of Finance, the confidence of the investors returned and the French economy recovered. Reynaud's reforms involved a massive austerity program (although armament measures were not cut). At the outbreak of war, however, Reynaud was not bullish on France's economy; he felt that the massive increase in spending that a war entailed would stamp out France's recovery.

The French Right was ambivalent about the war in late 1939 and early 1940, feeling that the Soviets rather than Nazi Germany were the greater long-term threat. Daladier regarded the war with Germany as the greater priority and so refused to send aid to the Finns, who were under attack from the USSR, then loosely allied to Germany, in the Winter War. News that the Finns had sued for peace in March 1940 prompted Flandin and Pierre Laval to hold secret sessions of the legislature that denounced Daladier's actions; the government fell on 19 March. The government named Reynaud Prime Minister of France two days later.

== Prime minister, resignation, and arrest ==
=== Appointment ===
Despite Reynaud's growing popularity, the Chamber of Deputies elected him as Premier by a narrow margin of just one vote, with most of his own party abstaining. Notably, over half of the votes in Reynaud's favour came from the French Section of the Workers' International (SFIO) party. Given the significant support from the left and opposition from many right-wing parties, Reynaud's government faced considerable instability. Many on the right called for Reynaud to shift focus from Germany to the Soviet Union. Additionally, the Chamber mandated that Daladier, whom Reynaud personally blamed for France's weaknesses, serve as Reynaud's Minister of National Defence and War.

One of Reynaud's initial actions was attending a meeting of the Anglo-French Supreme War Council in London on 28 March 1940. The meeting culminated in a declaration with British Prime Minister Neville Chamberlain, stating that neither country would seek a separate peace. The joint communiqué asserted, "Both Governments mutually undertake that during the present war they will neither negotiate nor conclude an armistice or treaty of peace except by mutual agreement. They undertake to maintain after conclusion of peace a community of action for so long as may be necessary".

On 15 June 1940, the French cabinet rejected a British proposal—conceived by Jean Monnet and supported by De Gaulle—for a union between France and Britain. Reynaud abandoned the idea of a "long war strategy" based on attrition. To divert German attention from France, Reynaud considered expanding the war to the Balkans or Northern Europe. He played a key role in initiating the Allied campaign in Norway, although it ended in failure. Following Britain's decision to withdraw on 26 April, Reynaud travelled to London to personally urge the British to continue their fight in Norway.

=== The German breakthrough ===
The Battle of France began less than two months after Reynaud assumed office. The initial German attack in early May 1940 severely damaged French defences, and Paris was under threat. On 15 May, just five days after the invasion began, Reynaud famously remarked to Churchill that "We have been defeated... we are beaten; we have lost the battle... The front is broken near Sedan." The dire state of French equipment and morale was underscored by a postcard found on the body of an officer who had committed suicide in Le Mans. The postcard read: "I am killing myself Mr President to let you know that all my men were brave, but one cannot send men to fight tanks with rifles."

On 18 May, Reynaud dismissed Commander-in-Chief Maurice Gamelin and replaced him with Maxime Weygand.

On 26 May, Reynaud attended a meeting in London with Churchill. During the meeting, Churchill informed the War Cabinet that Reynaud had declared the French military situation as hopeless. Reynaud stated he had no intention of signing a separate peace with Germany but might be compelled to resign, leaving the possibility that others in the French government could sign such a treaty. Churchill also mentioned that he did not rule out talks with Mussolini, who was still neutral at that time. Later that day, Foreign Secretary Lord Halifax met with Reynaud before his return to France. This marked the beginning of the British May 1940 War Cabinet Crisis, where Halifax supported what was known as "the Reynaud Option"—exploring negotiations with the Italians for acceptable peace terms, potentially involving concessions in the Mediterranean. However, Churchill ultimately overruled Halifax.

On 28 May, Churchill sent a telegram to Reynaud confirming that there would be no immediate approach to Mussolini, although the option remained open. Mussolini had already rejected an overture by President Roosevelt based on suggestions from Britain and France. It was also revealed on 28 May that Italy was preparing to enter the war on Germany's side, which would occur on 10 June.

In early June, Charles de Gaulle, whom Reynaud had long supported and one of the few French commanders to achieve success against the Germans in May 1940, was promoted to brigadier general and appointed undersecretary of war.

=== Support for an armistice; Reynaud's resignation ===
Reynaud wavered somewhat upon his return from London on 26 May but remained committed to continuing the fight. However, he was unable to convince enough of his colleagues to support this stance. Italy entered the war on 10 June, and on the same day, General Weygand, the Commander-in-Chief, stormed into Reynaud's office and demanded an armistice. That night, around 11 pm, Reynaud and de Gaulle left Paris for Tours, with the rest of the government following the next day. De Gaulle was unable to persuade Reynaud to dismiss Weygand.

At the Anglo-French conference held at the Château du Muguet in Briare on 11–12 June, Churchill urged the French to continue fighting, either from Brittany, French North Africa, or through guerrilla warfare. However, he faced strong resistance from Deputy Prime Minister Marshal Pétain. By the Cabinet meeting on the evening of 12 June, it was evident that a significant faction was pushing for an armistice, leading to the decision to relocate the government to Bordeaux rather than retreat to a fortified Brittany.

During the subsequent Anglo-French conference in Tours on 13 June, Reynaud requested to be released from the agreement he had made with Prime Minister Neville Chamberlain in March 1940, so that France could pursue an armistice. Churchill expressed understanding but did not agree with the request. That evening, Pétain, who strongly supported Weygand's call for an armistice, announced his intention to remain in France to share the suffering of the French people and begin a national renewal. President Albert Lebrun refused Reynaud's resignation on 13 June.

Edward Spears noted that Reynaud was under immense stress starting the evening of 13 June. Paul Baudouin and Marie-Joseph Paul de Villelume, along with Reynaud's mistress, the Comtesse Hélène de Portes—a Fascist sympathizer—were pressuring him to seek an armistice. On 14 June, Villelume and de Portes met with American diplomat Anthony Joseph Drexel Biddle Jr. and stated that France had no choice but to seek an armistice, although Biddle was sceptical of their claims.

At the Cabinet meeting on 15 June, Reynaud proposed that France follow the Dutch example and lay down its arms to continue the fight from abroad. Pétain showed some sympathy for this idea, and he was sent to speak with General Weygand, who argued that this would be a dishonourable surrender. Chautemps then suggested a compromise of inquiring about terms, which the Cabinet approved by a vote of 13–6. Reynaud attempted to resign on the spot but was vehemently opposed by Lebrun. Admiral Darlan, who had previously opposed an armistice, agreed to it on the condition that the French fleet remained out of German hands. On the same day, Reynaud threw two glasses of water at de Portes during dinner after discovering a key telegram in her bed, which had gone missing.

On 16 June, de Portes was frequently seen at Reynaud's office, leading US diplomats to suspect her presence was significant. President Roosevelt's reply to Reynaud's inquiry, indicating limited assistance without Congressional approval, was received that morning. Churchill's telegram, also received on 16 June, proposed an armistice if the French fleet was moved to British ports—a condition unacceptable to Darlan, who feared it would leave France defenseless. That afternoon, de Gaulle was in London discussing a proposed Franco-British Union—a plan hastily put together by Churchill and his advisers to support Reynaud against those favouring an armistice and to keep France, especially its naval fleet, in the war alongside Britain. De Gaulle called Reynaud to inform him of the British Cabinet's agreement to the proposal, reporting that "a sensational declaration" was imminent. Time was critical, and de Gaulle dictated the "Declaration of Union" to Reynaud over the phone, enabling him to present it to his Cabinet that afternoon in an attempt to counter the armistice faction. Unknown to Reynaud, General Weygand had ordered his phone to be tapped, depriving Reynaud of the element of surprise.

When the French Cabinet met in Bordeaux that afternoon, Reynaud presented the British union plan and, with Georges Mandel, declared his resolve to continue fighting. However, the proposal was no longer enough to sway the wavering ministers. Contrary to Lebrun's later recollection, no formal vote taken that day. The outcome was unclear: ten ministers wanted to continue the fight, seven, including Deputy Prime Ministers Pétain and Chautemps, favoured an armistice, and eight were undecided but ultimately leaned towards accepting an armistice. Lebrun reluctantly accepted Reynaud's resignation, and the French government, at this critical moment, fell into the hands of Pétain and those advocating for an armistice and collaboration with the German invader. De Gaulle later described Reynaud as "a man of great worth unjustly crushed by events beyond measure".

=== After resignation ===
Julian Jackson notes that Reynaud felt a profound sense of guilt for 20 years over allowing Pétain to come to power and offered increasingly convoluted explanations for the events that transpired. Despite Reynaud's own fighting spirit and a brief moment of indecision on 26 May, he regretted not being able to emulate Clemenceau, France's great wartime Prime Minister from 1917 to 1918, and he never forgave himself for failing to be another de Gaulle. Reynaud later claimed he had hoped Pétain would resign if the armistice terms were too harsh; Jackson considers this to be wishful thinking. There were suggestions that Reynaud might have mustered a Cabinet majority for continuing the fight, but he later argued that he could not counter the political influence of the "softs", particularly Pétain and Weygand, France's leading military figures.

Spears observed that Reynaud seemed relieved to be free of his burden. In the immediate aftermath of his resignation, Reynaud appeared to be in denial, still hoping to meet Churchill at Concarneau on 17 June. However, Churchill, who was at London Waterloo station, had cancelled his travel plans upon learning of Reynaud's resignation.

Jules Jeanneney and Édouard Herriot, Presidents of the Senate and the Chamber of Deputies, respectively, urged President Lebrun to reappoint Reynaud as Prime Minister, as all four men wanted to continue the war from North Africa. Lebrun felt compelled to appoint Pétain, who was prepared with a ministerial team, as Prime Minister. Pétain became the head of the new government—the last of the Third Republic—and signed the armistice on 22 June. De Gaulle returned to Bordeaux around 10 pm on 16 June and visited Reynaud, who still hoped to relocate to North Africa and declined to go to London. Reynaud retained control of secret government funds until the transfer of power the next day, and allocated money to de Gaulle. De Gaulle, accompanied by Edward Spears, flew to London at 9 a.m. on 17 June and made his famous broadcast the following day, declaring his intent to continue the fight. Although it has been suggested that Reynaud ordered de Gaulle to go to London, no written evidence has ever confirmed this.

Reynaud later tentatively accepted Pétain's offer to become the French Ambassador to the US, but Lebrun refused to confirm the appointment, possibly because he admired Reynaud and wished to protect him from association with the Pétain government.

=== Accident and arrest ===
Reynaud and de Portes left the Hotel Splendid in Bordeaux, driving southeast to avoid the advancing German armies. They intended to stop at Reynaud's holiday home in Grès, Hérault (some sources suggest they were heading for his daughter's home in Sainte-Maxime) before fleeing to North Africa. On 28 June, while Reynaud was driving their Renault Juvaquatre, the car veered off the road and crashed into a plane tree at La Peyrade, near Sète. De Portes was killed (and almost decapitated) in the accident, while Reynaud sustained relatively minor head injuries. While hospitalized in Montpellier, Reynaud reportedly told Bill Bullitt, the American ambassador, "I have lost my country, my honour, and my love."

Upon his discharge, Reynaud was arrested on Pétain's orders and imprisoned at Fort du Portalet. Although Pétain chose not to charge Reynaud during the Riom Trial of 1942, he handed him over to the Germans. Reynaud was initially sent to Sachsenhausen concentration camp and later transferred to Itter Castle near Wörgl, Austria. There, he remained with other high-profile French prisoners until the castle was liberated by Allied troops on 7 May 1945. During the Battle for Castle Itter on 5 May 1945, Major Josef Gangl, a Wehrmacht officer who had joined the anti-Nazi Austrian resistance, was killed by a sniper's bullet while attempting to protect Reynaud and other prisoners.

== Post-World War II career ==
After the war, Reynaud was elected in 1946 as a member of the National Assembly. He was appointed to several cabinet positions in the post-war period and remained a prominent figure in French politics. His attempts to form governments in 1952 and 1953 in the turbulent politics of the French Fourth Republic were unsuccessful.

Reynaud supported the idea of a United States of Europe, along with a number of prominent contemporaries. He was a member of the Consultative Assembly of the Council of Europe for ten years, from 1949 to 1959, where he worked alongside his old wartime allies Churchill, Spaak and others to build a united Europe as a way of preventing future wars and a recurrence of the Nazi atrocities. Reynaud presided over the consultative committee that drafted the constitution of France's (current) Fifth Republic. In 1962, he denounced his old friend de Gaulle's replacement of the electoral college system by a direct public vote for the Presidency. Reynaud left office the same year.

== Appearance and private life ==
Reynaud was a physically small man, with "the countenance of a samurai who had been educated at Cambridge". His head was set deep between his shoulders, and he had "a sharp, nasal, metallic voice" and "mechanical" bearing.

By his first marriage in 1912 to Jeanne Anne Henri-Robert, he was the father of a daughter, Collette, born in 1914. At some time in the early 1920s, Reynaud was introduced to Hélène Rebuffel by André Tardieu, a friend of her father's. Rebuffel's father, however, was displeased at her relationship with a married man, actively seeking other suitors for her, and she was eventually persuaded to marry Comte Henri de Portes. After she had borne him two children, the marriage failed, and when Reynaud and his wife separated in 1938, Hélène de Portes was his mistress until her death in the road accident at Frontignan in 1940. Reynaud and his first wife were finally divorced in 1949. Reynaud then married Christiane Mabire (one of his former office assistants, who had voluntarily joined him at the Castle Itter in 1943) at Versailles in the same year, at the age of 71. Mabire had already borne him a son, Serge Paul-Reynaud, in 1945; they had two more children, Evelyne, in 1949, and Alexandre in 1954.

Reynaud died on 21 September 1966 at Neuilly-sur-Seine, leaving a number of writings.

== Reynaud's government, 21 March – 16 June 1940 ==
- Paul Reynaud – President of the Council and Minister of Foreign Affairs
- Camille Chautemps – Vice President of the Council, Minister for Coordination
- Édouard Daladier – Minister of National Defense and War
- Raoul Dautry – Minister of Armaments
- Henri Roy – Minister of the Interior
- Lucien Lamoureux – Minister of Finance
- Charles Pomaret – Minister of Labour
- Albert Sérol – Minister of Justice
- César Campinchi – Minister of Military Marine
- Alphonse Rio – Minister of Merchant Marine
- Laurent Eynac – Minister of Air
- Albert Sarraut – Minister of National Education
- Albert Rivière – Minister of Veterans and Pensioners
- Paul Thellier – Minister of Agriculture
- Henri Queuille – Minister of Supply
- Georges Mandel – Minister of Colonies
- Anatole de Monzie – Minister of Public Works
- Marcel Héraud – Minister of Public Health
- Alfred Jules-Julien – Minister of Posts, Telegraphs, Telephones, and Transmissions
- Ludovic-Oscar Frossard – Minister of Information
- Louis Rollin – Minister of Commerce and Industry
- Georges Monnet – Minister of Blockade

Changes

- 10 May 1940 – Louis Marin and Jean Ybarnegaray enter the Cabinet as Ministers of State
- 18 May 1940 – Philippe Pétain enters the Cabinet as Minister of State. Reynaud succeeds Daladier as Minister of National Defense and War. Daladier succeeds Reynaud as Minister of Foreign Affairs. Georges Mandel succeeds Roy as Minister of the Interior. Louis Rollin succeeds Mandel as Minister of Colonies. Léon Baréty succeeds Rollin as Minister of Commerce and Industry.
- 5 June 1940 – Reynaud succeeds Daladier as Minister of Foreign Affairs, remaining also Minister of National Defense and War. Yves Bouthillier succeeds Lamoureux as Minister of Finance. Yvon Delbos succeeds Sarraut as Minister of National Education. Ludovic-Oscar Frossard succeeds Monzie as Minister of Public Works. Jean Prouvost succeeds Frossard as Minister of Information. Georges Pernot succeeds Héraud as Health Minister, with the new title of Minister of French Family. Albert Chichery succeeds Baréty as Minister of Commerce and Industry.

== See also ==
- Interwar France

== Notes ==
Political offices
Preceded by Charles Dumont	Minister of Finance; 1930	Succeeded by Louis Germain-Martin
Preceded by Théodore Steeg	Minister of the Colonies; 1931–1932	Succeeded by Louis de Chappedelaine
Preceded by Lucien Hubert	Vice President of the Council; 1932	Succeeded by Albert Dalimier
Preceded by Léon Bérard	Minister of Justice; 1932	Succeeded by René Renoult
Preceded by Marc Rucart	Minister of Justice; 1938	Succeeded by Paul Marchandeau
Preceded by Paul Marchandeau	Minister of Finance; 1938–1940	Succeeded by Lucien Lamoureux
Preceded by Édouard Daladier	President of the Council; 1940	Succeeded by Philippe Pétain
Preceded by Édouard Daladier	Minister of Foreign Affairs; 1940	Succeeded by Édouard Daladier
Preceded by Édouard Daladier	Minister of National Defense and War; 1940	Succeeded by Maxime Weygand
Preceded by Édouard Daladier	Minister of Foreign Affairs; 1940	Succeeded by Philippe Pétain
Preceded by René Mayer	Minister of Finance and Economic Affairs; 1948	Succeeded by Christian Pineau
Preceded by –	Minister responsible for Relations with Partner States and the Far East; 1950	Succeeded by Jean Letourneau
Preceded by Henri Queuille	Vice President of the Council with Henri Queuille and Pierre-Henri Teitgen; 1953–1954	Succeeded by Guy Mollet
