= Joseph Paganon =

French chemical engineer and politician (1880–1937)

Minister of Public Works
- In office 31 January 1933 – 9 February 1934
- Prime Minister: Daladier, Sarraut, Chautemps, Daladier
- Preceded by: Georges Bonnet
- Succeeded by: Pierre-Étienne Flandin

Minister of Public Works
- In office 1 June 1935 – 4 June 1935
- Prime Minister: Fernand Bouisson
- Preceded by: Henri Roy
- Succeeded by: Laurent Eynac

Interior Minister
- In office 7 June 1935 – 22 January 1936
- Prime Minister: Pierre Laval
- Preceded by: Fernand Bouisson
- Succeeded by: Albert Sarraut

Personal details
- Born: 19 March 1880 Vourey, Isère, France
- Died: 2 November 1937 (aged 57) Paris, France
- Occupation: Chemical engineer

Joseph Paganon (19 March 1880 – 2 November 1937) was a French chemical engineer and politician. He was Minister of Public Works in 1933–34, and for a few days in 1935. He helped provide infrastructure needed by the alpine tourist industry in his native department of Isère, and introduced reforms to railway regulations. He was Minister of the Interior in 1935–36 during a period when France was struggling to manage an influx of refugees from Nazi Germany, and tensions were rising in the French colony of Algeria.

== Early years (1880–1924) ==
Joseph Paganon was born on 19 March 1880 in Vourey, Isère. His parents were Marie and Alexandre Paganon from Laval, teachers in Vourey. He spent his childhood in Sainte-Agnès, a small mountain village, He studied at the Lycée Polyvalent Vaucanson in Grenoble. He won a scholarship that let him study at the Faculty of Science in Lyon and the School of Chemistry. He graduated with a diploma as a chemical engineer and a Bachelor of Science.

Paganon moved to Paris to work as a secretary at the head office of the Poulenc frères company, while studying under Louis Bouveault (1864–1909) at the Sorbonne. He earned a doctorate in Chemistry with a thesis on artificial silk. This won him a travel scholarship to Germany. There he was attached to the French embassy in Berlin and attended courses of Hermann Emil Fischer at the Faculty of Science. After returning to Paris he became a contributor to the journal Le Temps, writing on economic and social topics. In 1906 Paganon joined the office of the Minister of Agriculture. In 1908 he was appointed adviser on foreign trade. He was secretary general of the National Committee of Advisers on Foreign Trade.

Paganon became chief of staff to Jules Pams, Minister of Agriculture from 1911 to 1913. During World War I (1914–18) he served in the chasseurs before being attached as a chemist to the Ministry of Armament, with the status of artillery officer. In 1917 Paganon was recalled to the Ministry of Agriculture, where he was chief of staff until 1918. As an officer, he was also military attaché to Georges Clemenceau. Soon after the war Pams, now Minister of the Interior, appointed him chief of staff to that Ministry. He was elected mayor of the commune of Laval, Isère.

== Deputy (1924–37) ==
Paganon ran unsuccessfully for election to the legislature on 16 November 1919. On 11 May 1924 he was elected deputy for the Isère. He joined the Radical and Radical Socialist group in the chamber. He was elected to the general council of Isère representing Goncelin in 1925. He was reelected deputy in April–May 1928 for the first district of Grenoble, and was again elected on 1 May 1932. On 3 June 1932 he was appointed under-secretary of state for Foreign Affairs in the third cabinet of Édouard Herriot, holding office until 14 December 1932. In this role he participated in the Geneva talks of June 1932 on German reparations for World War I damages.

=== Minister of Public Works (1933–34) ===
On 31 January 1933 Paganon was appointed Minister of Public Works in the first cabinet of Édouard Daladier. He retained this post in the cabinets of Albert Sarraut and Camille Chautemps and the second cabinet of Daladier, which fell on 7 February 1934. As Minister of Public Works he reclassified 40,000 kilometres (25,000 mi) of roads into the national network. He began work on the Chambon and Sautet dams. In Isère he created or improved tourist routes, including access to Villard-Notre-Dame, and the link from Uriage to Allevard called the "Balcon de Belledonne". In the mid-1930s the Alpe d'Huez resort consisted of a few cabins and chalets, one of them owned by Paganon, reached by a zigzag gravel road. Paganon anticipated a boom in winter sports and authorized construction of a new road up to the resort. Fourteen companies shared the task, each building 1 kilometre (0.62 mi) of the road. The ski resort soon began to thrive.

In response to requests from the railway companies to allow greater competition with road haulage companies, Paganon introduced what became known as the "Paganon amendment", The amendment to the act of 1921 was dated 8 July 1933. It gave the government greater power, and allowed for various changes to earlier acts to improve efficiency. The effect was a thorough overhaul of railway operations, tariffs, stock and infrastructure. The reform did little to improve the financial condition of the railways, which continued to lose money. Paganon was also unable to resolve the problem of coordinating rail and road haulage without favoring one or the other.

Paganon was very briefly Minister of Public Works in the ephemeral cabinet of Fernand Bouisson from 1–4 June 1935. On 17 November 1935 he was elected senator for the Isère in a by-election.

=== Minister of the Interior (1935–36) ===
Paganon was appointed Minister of the Interior in the fourth cabinet of Pierre Laval on 7 June 1935. He had to deal with growing numbers of refugees from Nazi Germany and Eastern Europe. The French position on the High Commission for Refugees, Jewish and Other (HCR) of the League of Nations was ambiguous. France wanted a weak organization that would not interfere with French rights to refuse visas and expel refugees, and a strong organization that would force other countries to take more refugees, particularly in the Americas. Paganon observed that the HCR wanted to get France to absorb the refugees already in the country so the HCR could concentrate on placing the refugees who were continuing to flee from Germany. He felt this was "unfavorable toward those rare countries like our own, which had committed the imprudence of welcoming foreigners too generously." However, he agreed that France could not return refugees to countries where their lives were in danger.

Paganon began to explore the possibility of placing refugees in farming settlements in the south of France. In November he issued two circulars that stated that refugees and stateless foreigners could not be expelled unless they had committed crimes or subversive acts. This did not prevent expulsions, as the Sûreté Nationale often refused to recognize that West European Jews were stateless. Some French diplomats warned that France should not give the impression of welcoming opponents of the Nazis. However, Paganon announced at the end of 1935 that he would consider naturalizing some refugees so they could serve in the armed forces. He wanted to follow a humane approach that would avoid putting the refugees in concentration camps or prisons, and would allow most of them to remain in France. This conflicted with popular opposition to letting refugees work in trades and professions where they would compete with the French for scarce jobs.

In August 1935 Paganon was informed by the Algerian governor-general George Le Beau of a surge of anti-Semitism by French colons, many of whom had joined the right wing Front paysan and Croix-de-Feu. Poor Muslims were being drawn into clashes with the Jews. Le Beau was concerned that the unrest could lead to violence against Europeans who tried to protect the Jews. On 30 August 1935 Paganon issued a law that aimed to prevent disruption of auctions of land of bankrupt colons. Prefects were afraid that if the government yielded to colon pressure to halt these bankruptcy sales, the indigenous people who were struggling to pay taxes after a poor harvest might revolt against the regime. In September 1935 Paganon observed, "the North Africans residing in the Paris region follow the different phases of the Italian–Ethiopian conflict with a vivid interest. ... They reckon that it is the duty of all Muslims unreservedly to lend their material and moral support to the Ethiopians."

Paganon left the Ministry of the Interior on 22 January 1936. With his health undermined, unable to recover through rest in his native Alps, Joseph Paganon died in Paris on 2 November 1937 at the age of 57.

== Sources ==
- Caron, Vicki (1999). Uneasy Asylum: France and the Jewish Refugee Crisis, 1933-1942. Stanford University Press. ISBN 978-0-8047-4377-8.
- Cossins, Peter (2015-05-28). Alpe d'Huez: The Story of Pro Cycling's Greatest Climb. Aurum Press Limited. ISBN 978-1-78131-477-7.
- Duroselle, Jean-Baptiste (2013-10-18). France and the Nazi Threat: The Collapse of French Diplomacy 1932-1939. Enigma Books. ISBN 978-1-929631-15-5.
- Goebel, Michael (2015-08-25). Anti-Imperial Metropolis. Cambridge University Press. ISBN 978-1-107-07305-0.
- Jolly, Jean (1960–1977). "PAGANON (Joseph)". Dictionnaire des parlementaires français (1889–1940). Paris: Presses universitaires de France. ISBN 2-1100-1998-0.
- Jones, Joseph (1984-07-01). Politics of Transport in Twentieth-Century France. McGill-Queen's Press - MQUP. ISBN 978-0-7735-6097-0.
- "Joseph Paganon". La Garde en Oisans (in French).
- Kalman, Samuel (2013-10-03). French Colonial Fascism: The Extreme Right in Algeria, 1919-1939. Palgrave Macmillan. ISBN 978-1-137-30709-5.
- "Nécrologie: Joseph Paganon" (PDF). Bulletin de l'Association amicale des anciens élèves de l'École de chimie industrielle de Lyon, 1887 (in French) (135). November–December 1937.
- Roth, Ralf; Divall, Colin (2015-03-28). From Rail to Road and Back Again?: A Century of Transport Competition and Interdependency. Ashgate Publishing, Ltd. ISBN 978-1-4094-7115-8.
