= Château de Chazeron =

Castle in the commune of Loubeyrat in the French département of Puy-de-Dôme

Coordinates: 45°55′22″N 3°2′11″E

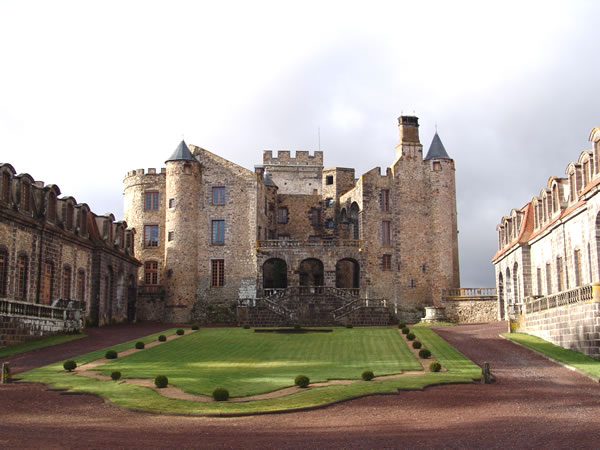
The Château de Chazeron

The Château de Chazeron is a castle situated in the commune of Loubeyrat in the French département of Puy-de-Dôme, 3 km (1.9 mi) north-west of Châtel-Guyon.

Originally a medieval castle, Chazeron was altered in the 17th century by the architect Jules Hardouin-Mansart. He built a staircase on the site of the keep and added an arcaded gallery. The moat was filled in, three of the external walls were demolished and two wings were added.

During the Second World War, Léon Blum, Georges Mandel, Édouard Daladier, Paul Reynaud and Maurice Gamelin were imprisoned in the castle in 1942 before their appearance at the Riom Trial.

Today, the castle is a cultural centre, exhibiting drawings and avant-garde furniture. The keep offers views over the Sardon valley and the Limagne plain.

The castle has been listed as a monument historique by the French Ministry of Culture since 1944.

== See also ==
List of castles in France
