= Paul Jacquier =

French politician (1879–1961)

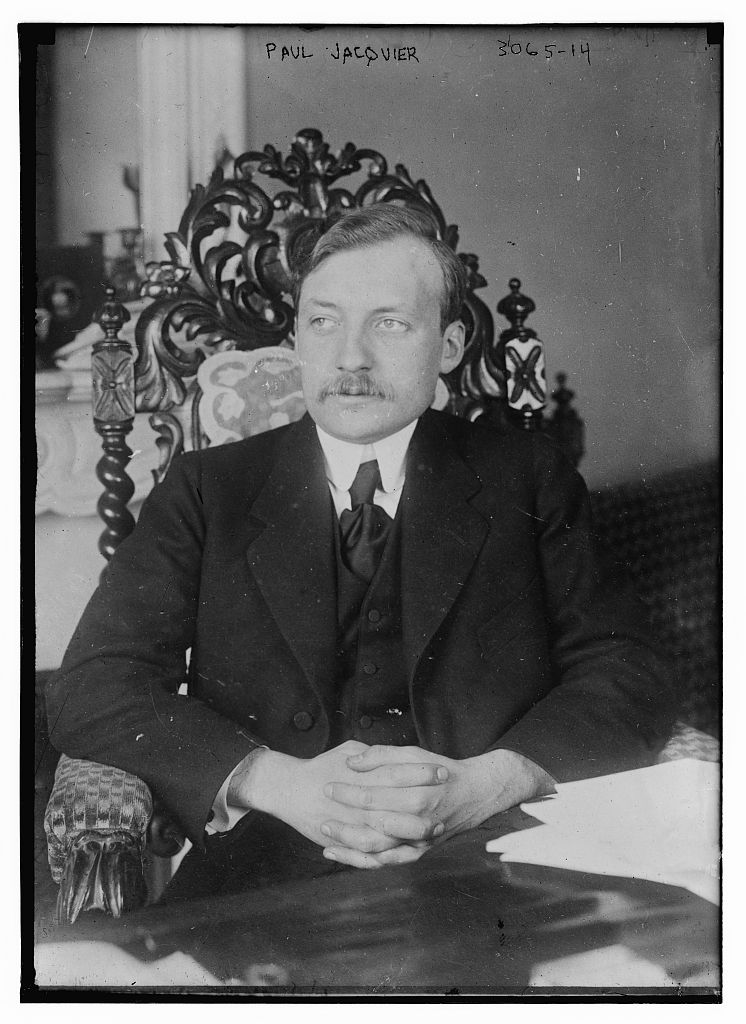

Paul Jacquier (French pronunciation: [pɔl ʒakje]; 26 March 1879 – 3 March 1961) was a French senator.

On 10 July 1940, he voted as a Senator in favour of granting the cabinet presided by Marshal Philippe Pétain authority to draw up a new constitution, thereby effectively ending the French Third Republic and establishing Vichy France.

== Positions ==
- MP of Haute-Savoie from 1909 to 1919 and from 1924 to 1935
- Senator of Haute-Savoie from 1935 to 1940
- Undersecretary of State for Fine Arts on Dec. 9 1913 to 9 June 1914 in the government of Gaston Doumergue
- Undersecretary of State for the Interior on June 14, 1914, to October 29, 1915, in the governments of René Viviani and René Viviani
- Undersecretary of State for Finance of 19 to 23 July 1926 in the government of Édouard Herriot
- Minister of Labour on November 8, 1934, at 1 June 1935 in the government of Pierre-Étienne Flandin
- Minister of Agriculture from 1 to 7 June 1935 in the government of Fernand Bouisson
