= Pierre-Étienne Flandin =

French prime minister

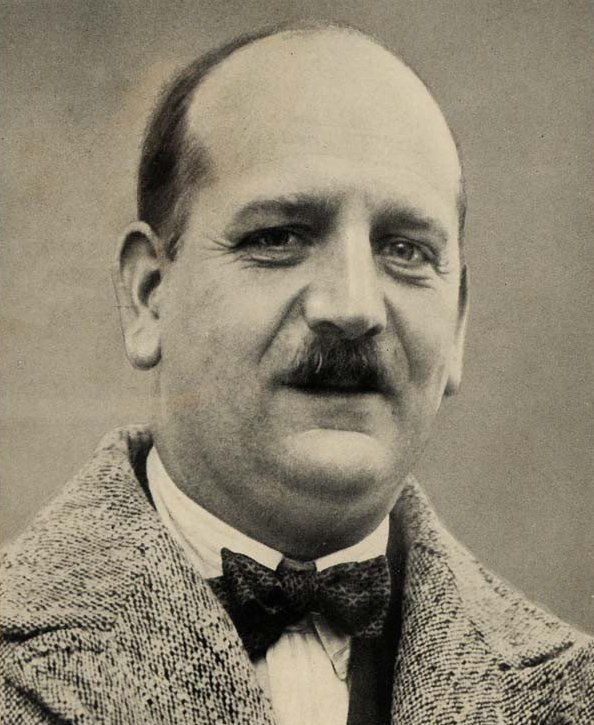
- Flandin in 1935

Deputy Prime Minister of France
- In office 13 December 1940 – 9 February 1941
- Chief of the State: Philippe Pétain
- Preceded by: Pierre Laval
- Succeeded by: François Darlan

Prime Minister of France
- In office 8 November 1934 – 1 June 1935
- President: Albert Lebrun
- Preceded by: Gaston Doumergue
- Succeeded by: Fernand Bouisson

Personal details
- Born: April 12, 1889 Paris, France
- Died: 13 June 1958 (aged 69) Saint-Jean-Cap-Ferrat, France
- Party: Democratic Republican Alliance (1914–1940)

Pierre-Étienne Flandin (French: [pjɛʁ etjɛn flɑ̃dɛ̃]; 12 April 1889 – 13 June 1958) was a French conservative politician of the Third Republic, leader of the Democratic Republican Alliance (ARD), and Prime Minister of France from 1934 to 1935.

A military pilot during World War I, Flandin held a number of cabinet posts during the interwar period. He was minister of commerce, under the premiership of Frédéric François-Marsal, for just five days in 1924. He was minister of commerce and industry in the premierships of André Tardieu in 1931 and 1932. Between those posts, he served under Pierre Laval as finance minister. In 1934 (6 February to 8 November), he was minister of public works in the second cabinet of Gaston Doumergue. He became prime minister in November 1934, but his premiership lasted only until June 1935. However, a number of important pacts were negotiated during his term: the Franco-Italian Agreement of 1935, the Stresa Front and the Franco-Soviet Pact. Flandin was, at 45, the youngest prime minister in French history.

Flandin was the French foreign minister when Adolf Hitler ordered the Wehrmacht to reoccupy the Rhineland on 7 March 1936. He attempted to organize a strong response but was unable to without British support. Supporting appeasement during the Munich crisis hurt his career. On 13 December 1940, Vichy Chief of State Philippe Pétain appointed Flandin foreign minister and deputy prime minister, replacing Pierre Laval. He occupied that position for only two months.

He was ousted by François Darlan in January 1941.

After the Liberation of France, Flandin was put on trial for treason but the high court acquitted him. He was instead sentenced to 5 years in prison for "national unworthiness"; however, his sentence was remitted due to his help of the resistance during the war.

A street in Avallon was named in his honour. In May 2017, it was renamed in honour of the murdered British MP, Jo Cox.

== Flandin's ministry, 8 November 1934 – 1 June 1935 ==
- Pierre Étienne Flandin – president of the council
- Georges Pernot – vice president of the council and minister of justice
- Pierre Laval – minister of foreign affairs
- Louis Maurin – minister of war
- Marcel Régnier – minister of the interior
- Louis Germain-Martin – minister of finance
- Paul Jacquier – minister of labour
- François Piétri – minister of military marine
- William Bertrand – minister of merchant marine
- Victor Denain – minister of air
- André Mallarmé – minister of national education
- Georges Rivollet – minister of pensions
- Émile Casset – minister of agriculture
- Louis Rollin – minister of colonies
- Henri Roy – minister of public works
- Henri Queuille – minister of public health and physical education
- Georges Mandel – minister of posts, telegraphs, and telephones
- Paul Marchandeau – minister of commerce and industry
- Édouard Herriot – minister of state
- Louis Marin – minister of state

Political offices
Preceded by Louis Loucheur	Minister of Commerce, Industry, Posts, and Telegraphs; 1924	Succeeded by Eugène Raynaldy
Preceded by Georges Bonnefous	Minister of Commerce and Industry; 1929–1930	Succeeded by Georges Bonnet
Preceded by Georges Bonnet	Minister of Commerce and Industry; 1930	Succeeded by Louis Loucheur
Preceded by Louis Germain-Martin	Minister of Finance; 1931–1932	Succeeded by Henry Chéron
Preceded by Joseph Paganon	Minister of Public Works; 1934	Succeeded by Henry Roy
Preceded by Gaston Doumergue	President of the Council; 1934–1935	Succeeded by Fernand Bouisson
Preceded by Philippe Pétain	Minister without Portfolio; 1935–1936	Succeeded by –
Preceded by Pierre Laval	Minister of Foreign Affairs; 1936	Succeeded by Yvon Delbos
Preceded by Pierre Laval	Minister of Foreign Affairs; 1940–1941	Succeeded by François Darlan
