= Fernand Bouisson =

French politician (1874–1959)

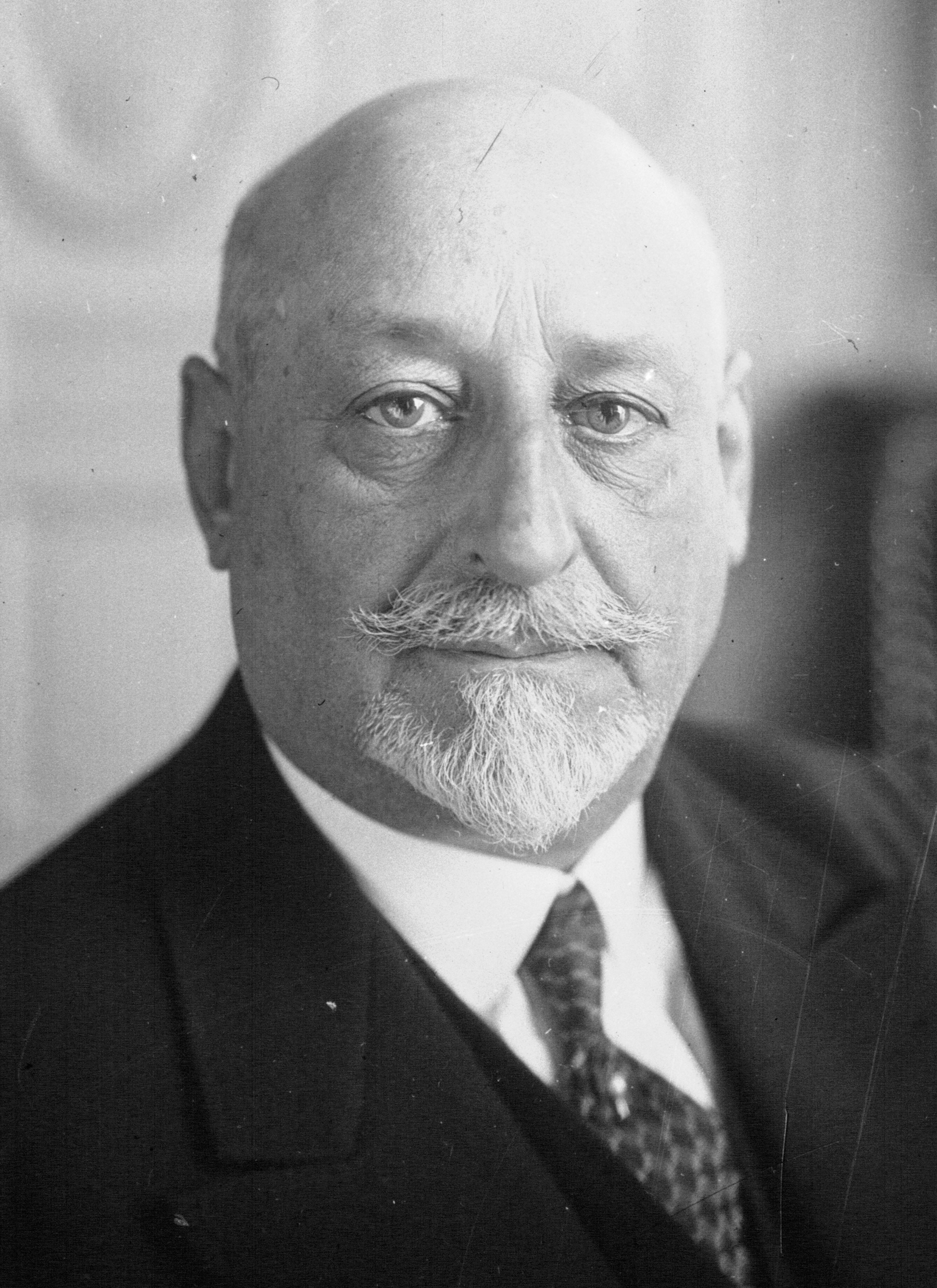
- Bouisson in 1931

Prime Minister of France
- In office 1 June 1935 – 7 June 1935
- President: Albert Lebrun
- Preceded by: Pierre Étienne Flandin
- Succeeded by: Pierre Laval

President of the Chamber of Deputies
- In office 11 January 1927 – 31 May 1936
- Preceded by: Raoul Péret
- Succeeded by: Édouard Herriot

Personal details
- Born: 16 June 1874 Constantine, French Algeria
- Died: 28 December 1959 (aged 85) Antibes, France
- Party: None

Fernand Bouisson (French: [fɛʁnɑ̃ bwisɔ̃]; 16 June 1874 – 28 December 1959) was a Socialist French politician of the Third Republic, who served as President of the Chamber of Deputies from 1927 to 1936 and briefly as Prime Minister in June 1935 following the ouster of Pierre-Étienne Flandin.

== Bouisson's Ministry, 1–7 June 1935 ==
- Fernand Bouisson – President of the Council and Minister of the Interior
- Georges Pernot – Vice President of the Council and Minister of Justice
- Pierre Laval – Minister of Foreign Affairs
- Louis Maurin – Minister of War
- Joseph Caillaux – Minister of Finance
- Ludovic-Oscar Frossard – Minister of Labour
- François Piétri – Minister of Marine and interim Minister of Merchant Marine
- Victor Denain – Minister of Air
- Mario Roustan – Minister of National Education
- Camille Perfetti – Minister of Pensions
- Paul Jacquier – Minister of Agriculture
- Louis Rollin – Minister of Colonies
- Joseph Paganon – Minister of Public Works
- Louis Lafont – Minister of Public Health and Physical Education
- Georges Mandel – Minister of Posts, Telegraphs, and Telephones
- Laurent Eynac – Minister of Commerce and Industry
- Édouard Herriot – Minister of State
- Louis Marin – Minister of State
- Philippe Pétain – Minister of State

Political offices
Preceded by Raoul Péret	President of the Chamber of Deputies; 1927–1936	Succeeded by Édouard Herriot
Preceded by Pierre-Étienne Flandin	Prime Minister of France; 1935	Succeeded by Pierre Laval
