= Henri Roy =

French politician (1873–1950)

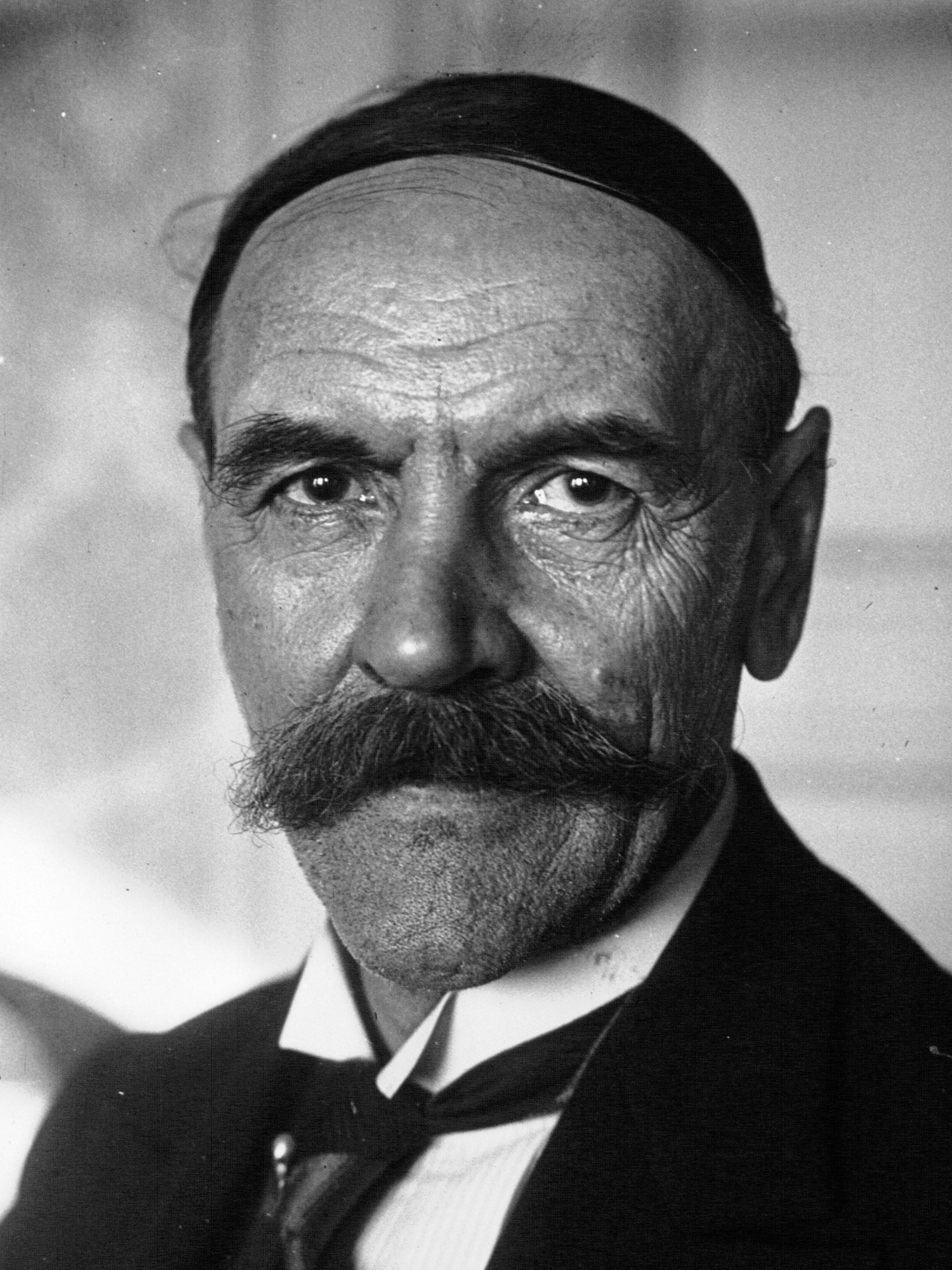
- Roy in 1932

Minister of Public Works
- In office 8 November 1934 – 31 May 1935
- Preceded by: Pierre-Étienne Flandin
- Succeeded by: Joseph Paganon

Minister of the Interior
- In office 21 March 1940 – 18 May 1940
- Prime Minister: Paul Reynaud
- Preceded by: Albert Sarraut
- Succeeded by: Georges Mandel

Personal details
- Born: 17 February 1873 Le Bouchaud, Jura, France
- Died: 23 August 1950 (aged 77) Paris, France

Henri Roy (French pronunciation: [ɑ̃ʁi ʁwa]; 17 February 1873 – 23 August 1950) was a French politician who was deputy for Loiret from 1906 to 1919 and senator for Loiret from 1920 to 1941. He was Minister of Public Works in 1934–35 and was briefly Minister of the Interior in 1940.

== Life ==
Henri Roy was born on 17 February 1873 in Le Bouchaud, Jura, son of a schoolteacher in the small town. He won a scholarship to the lycée in Lons-le-Saunier, then entered the lycée Lakanal, and went on to the Collège Sainte-Barbe in Paris, where he prepared for teachers' college. There he met Jérôme and Jean Tharaud and Charles Péguy, with whom he formed a lasting friendship. He lost interest in becoming a teacher but gained degrees in letters and the law. The Dreyfus affair gave him an interest in politics, and for two months he contributed to the journal La Volonté that Franklin Bouillon and Pierre Baudin had founded in 1897. He then accepted the job of chief editor of the radical Orléans daily Le Progrès du Loiret.

Roy ran successfully for election in 1906 as deputy in the 2nd district of Orléans as the Republican and Radical candidate. He continued to work as a journalist and a lawyer and was admitted to the bar in Orléans. He was reelected in 1910 and 1914. After World War I (1914–18) he was appointed Commissioner of Supply by Georges Clemenceau on 15 July 1919. On 16 November 1919 he lost his seat in the general election. In January 1920 Roy was elected to the Senate, where he joined the Democratic Left group. He was reelected in 1924 and 1928 and was rapporteur of the budget in 1932 and 1933. He joined the Board of Directors of the National Board of liquid fuels, of which he became president in 1932.

On 8 November 1934 he joined the cabinet of Pierre-Étienne Flandin as Minister of Public Works, holding office until 31 May 1935. On 31 May 1935 he was reelected to the Senate and was elected vice-president of the Senate from 1936 to 1940. During World War II (1939–45) he joined the cabinet of Paul Reynaud as Minister of the Interior from 21 March 1940 to 18 May 1940. On 10 July 1940 he voted for the constitutional law that gave full power to Marshal Philippe Pétain. In 1941 he refused to accept the seat that was offered to him by the Vichy government in the National Council. After the war the jury of honor removed the ineligibility that resulted from his positive vote of 10 July 1940. He retired from public life and died in Paris on 23 August 1950 at the age of 77.

== Publications ==
- Pechelbronn, société anonyme d'exploitations minières (1937), Principes et pratique des essais physiques et chimiques effectués sur les produits pétrolifères, Ferraud, Jean, Collaborateur; Roy, Henri, Préfacier; Weiss, Henri, Préfacier, Paris; Liége: Ch. Béranger : Impr. Hérissey, p. 465

== Sources ==
- Collectif (2005), Dictionnaire des parlementaires français de 1940 à 1958 (in French), Paris: La Documentation française
- Jolly, Jean (1960–1977). "Roy (Henri)". Dictionnaire des parlementaires français; notices biographiques sur les ministres, députés et sénateurs français de 1889 à 1940 (in French). Paris: Presses universitaires de France. ISBN 2-1100-1998-0.
