= Georges Mandel =

French journalist and politician (1885–1944)

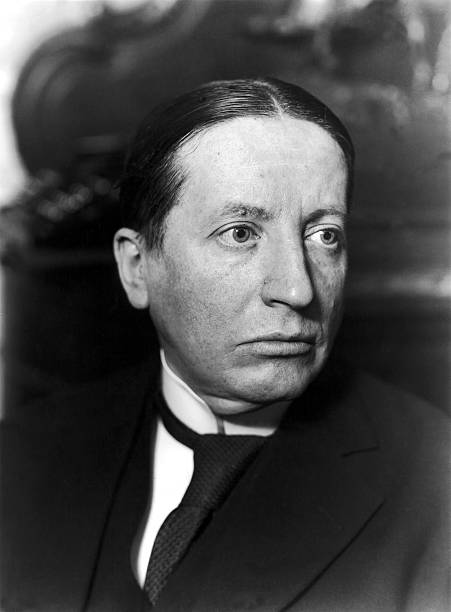
- Mandel in 1930

Member of the Chamber of Deputies
- In office 1 June 1928 – 10 July 1940 Serving with Daniel Bergey (until 1932) and Philippe Henriot (from 1932)
- Constituency: Gironde
- In office 18 December 1919 – 31 May 1924
- Constituency: Gironde
Cabinet positions
Minister of the Interior
In office 18 May 1940 – 16 June 1940
Prime Minister	Paul Reynaud
Preceded by	Henri Roy
Succeeded by	Charles Pomaret
Minister of the Colonies
In office 10 April 1938 – 18 May 1940
Prime Minister	Édouard Daladier
Preceded by	Marius Moutet
Succeeded by	Louis Rollin
Minister of Posts and Telegraphs
In office 8 November 1934 – 4 June 1936
Prime Minister	Pierre-Étienne Flandin; Fernand Bouisson; Pierre Laval; Albert Sarraut
Preceded by	André Mallarmé
Succeeded by	Robert Jardillier

Personal details
- Born: Louis George Rothschild; 5 June 1885 Chatou, France
- Died: 7 July 1944 (aged 59) Forest of Fontainebleau, German occupied France
- Cause of death: Execution by shooting
- Party: Independent; Republican Independents

Georges Mandel (born Louis George Rothschild; 5 June 1885 – 7 July 1944) was a French journalist and politician who was a member of the Chamber of Deputies representing Gironde from 1919 to 1924 and from 1928 until the dissolution of the French Third Republic in 1940. Described by Winston Churchill as "the first resister", Mandel fled France in the summer of that year and attempted to establish a government-in-exile upon the Fall of France, but was arrested in August of 1940 by the government of Vichy France and detained thereafter, primarily in Germany. He was executed by the Milice paramilitary group in 1944 in retaliation for the assassination of Philippe Henriot by the opposing Maquis, a cornerstone of the French resistance.

== Early life ==
Born Louis George Rothschild in Chatou in the department Yvelines, he was the son of a tailor and his wife. His family was Jewish, originally from Alsace. They moved into France in 1871 to preserve their French citizenship when Alsace-Lorraine was annexed by the German Empire at the end of the Franco-Prussian War.

== Early career ==
Mandel began working life as a journalist for L'Aurore, a literary and socialist newspaper founded in 1897 by Émile Zola and Georges Clemenceau. They notably defended Alfred Dreyfus during the Dreyfus Affair of the 1890s. The paper continued until 1916.

As Minister of the Interior, Clemenceau later brought Mandel into politics as his aide. Described as "Clemenceau's right-hand man," Mandel helped Clemenceau control the press and the trade union movement during the First World War. Clemenceau said of him: "I fart and Mandel stinks".

== Interwar period ==
In 1919 Mandel was elected to the Chamber of Deputies from Gironde. In September that year, he was delegated to try to draw the government out of its noncommittal attitude regarding the system of proportional representation adopted by both houses of the National Assembly earlier in the year. He lost his seat when the Cartel des Gauches swept the 1924 elections, but was reelected in 1928. By 1932, he had become the chairman of the Chamber's universal suffrage committee. Its actions led to passage of a bill enfranchising women, although the proposal was rejected by the Senate.

In 1934, Mandel was appointed Minister of Posts (1934–1936) and oversaw the first official television transmission in French.

Mandel was an economic conservative and an outspoken opponent of Nazism and fascism. In the 1930s, he played a similar role to that of Winston Churchill in the United Kingdom, highlighting the dangers posed by the rise of Adolf Hitler in Germany. He opposed Pierre Laval's plan to partition Ethiopia following its invasion by Benito Mussolini's Italy (the Second Italo–Abyssinian War of 1935–1936). Mandel advocated a military alliance with the Soviet Union and opposed the Munich Agreement.

During the 1936 Albert Sarraut government, Mandel served as both Minister of Posts and High Commissioner for Alsace and Lorraine. After the fall of the Popular Front government, he served as Minister of Colonies from 1938 to 18 May 1940 in the cabinet of Édouard Daladier. Mandel was known for his fierce hatred of the Foreign Minister Georges Bonnet, whose foreign policy he strongly opposed. By contrast, Mandel despite being a conservative and a protégé of Georges Clemenceau, was a close friend of the Soviet ambassador in Paris, Jakob Suritz. In February 1939, Suritz reported to Moscow that Mandel was "absolutely devoid of any sentimentality. This is in the purest sense a rationalist with a proclivity to cynicism and a strong inclination to conspiracy and intrigue". Suritz further stated that Mandel was lobbying very hard to have Bonnet sacked as foreign minister as he wrote: "He [Mandel] picks up facts, rumors, materials and bides his times. During the September days [of 1938], when he foresaw impending war and played for the first time the role of a second Clemenceau, he had already soaped the hangman's rope for Bonnet. He is keeping quiet now, but his hatred of Bonnet has not weakened. If you want to know anything about Bonnet, you have to go to Mandel".

== German invasion ==
In September 1939, after the outbreak of World War II, Mandel argued that the French Army should fight an offensive war. Mandel was accused by some on the right of being a warmonger and of placing his Jewish ancestry above France's interests. On 18 May 1940 Premier Paul Reynaud appointed him briefly Minister of the Interior.

Mandel opposed the Armistice of 22 June 1940 with the rapidly advancing Germans. He was an Anglophile and had inherited Georges Clemenceau's vicious tongue – he had particular contempt for Albert Lebrun, the President of the Republic, and for Deputy Prime Minister Camille Chautemps – but in the view of historian Julian Jackson he was a natural deputy, not a leader, and did not carry the political weight to oppose those - including France's two leading soldiers, Philippe Pétain and Maxime Weygand - who favoured an armistice. The British general Edward Spears, Churchill's military liaison officer, compared him to a fish, but a likeable one.

Winston S. Churchill, in his book The Second World War: Their Finest Hour. describes Mandel as a gallant public servant under the heading "The Great Mandel." Recounting his 2 o'clock luncheon with the man during Churchill's last trip to France for four years "almost to the day" on 13 June 1940 his account was very favorable, and is as follows:

We then returned to the Prefecture, where Mandel, Minister of the Interior, awaited us. This faithful former secretary of Clemenceau, and a bearer forward of his life's message, seemed in the best spirits. He was energy and defiance personified. His luncheon, an attractive chicken, was uneaten on the tray before him. He was a ray of sunshine. He had a telephone in each hand, through which he was constantly giving orders and decisions. His ideas were simple: fight on to the end in France, in order to cover the largest possible movement into Africa. This was the last time I saw this valiant Frenchman. The restored French Republic rightly shot to death the hirelings who murdered him. His memory is honored by his countrymen and their allies."

On 16 June 1940 in Bordeaux (the day Reynaud resigned and Pétain was asked to form a government), Mandel was arrested but released shortly afterwards, with apologies, upon urgent representations to Premier Pétain made jointly and in person by Édouard Herriot (President of the Chamber of Deputies) and Jules Jeanneney (President of the Senate). Spears offered Mandel the chance to leave on his plane on the morning of 17 June, together with Charles de Gaulle. Mandel declined, saying: "You fear for me because I am a Jew. Well, it is just because I am a Jew that I will not go tomorrow; it would look as though I was afraid, as if I was running away."

Mandel sought to persuade Lebrun, Herriot, Jeanneney, and as many members of the Cabinet as possible to travel to French North Africa, to continue the fight against the Germans. Only 25 other deputies and one senator embarked with Mandel on the SS Massilia on 21 June, including Pierre Mendès France and the former Popular Front education minister, Jean Zay.

== Arrest, detention and death ==
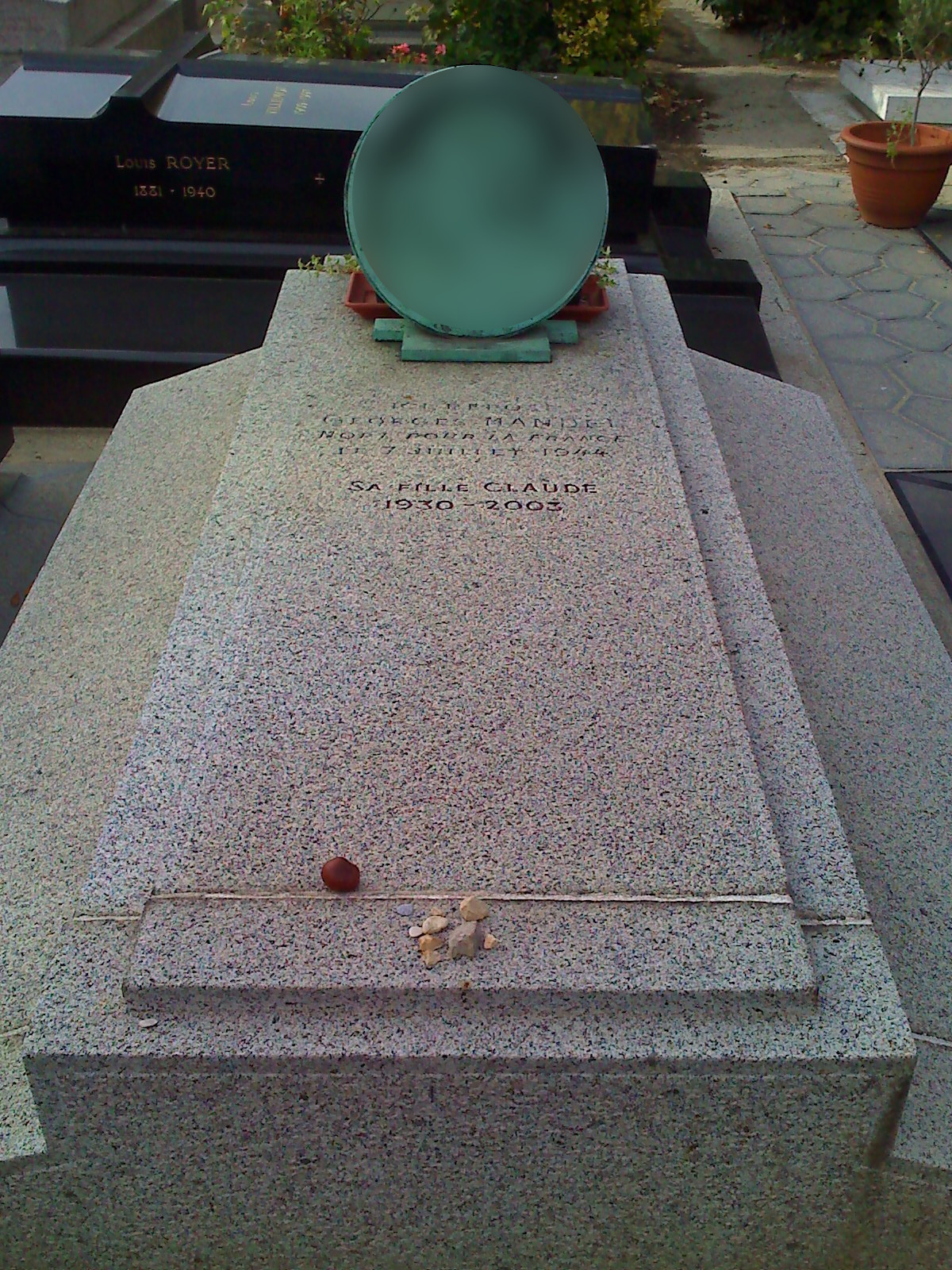
The grave of Mandel in Paris

Mandel's evacuation to North Africa prevented him from being able to vote in the Chamber of Deputies for the remainder of the Third Republic, meaning that his name is not among the 57 deputies and 23 senators (dubbed "the eighty"), who refused to suspend the constitutional laws of France and to give full powers to the government of Pétain on 10 July 1940.

Mandel was arrested on 8 August 1940 in French Morocco by General Charles Noguès on the orders of Pierre Laval, Prime Minister of the Vichy government. He was conveyed to the Château de Chazeron via Fort du Portalet, where Paul Reynaud, Édouard Daladier and General Maurice Gamelin were also being held prisoner. Churchill tried unsuccessfully to arrange Mandel's rescue. He described Mandel as "the first resister" and is believed to have preferred him over Charles de Gaulle to lead the Free French Forces. Following pressure from the Germans and the Riom Trial, all four were sentenced to life imprisonment on 7 November 1941.

In November 1942, after the German Army moved into unoccupied France and took it over to counter the threat from the Allies, who had just landed in North Africa, the French government at Vichy transferred Mandel and Reynaud to the Gestapo upon their request. The Gestapo deported Mandel to KZ Oranienburg, and then to KZ Buchenwald, where he was held with the French politician Léon Blum.

In 1944 the German Ambassador in Paris, Otto Abetz suggested to Laval that Mandel, Blum, and Reynaud should be murdered by the Vichy government in retaliation for the assassination of Philippe Henriot, Minister of Propaganda, by the Algiers Committee, the Communist-Socialist Maquis of the Resistance. Mandel was returned to Paris on 4 July 1944, supposedly as a hostage. While being transferred from one prison to another, he was captured by the Milice, the paramilitary Vichy force. Three days later, the Milice took Mandel to the Forest of Fontainebleau, where they murdered him. He was buried at Passy Cemetery.

Laval was appalled and protested that he could not condone the execution: "I have no blood on my hands...and no responsibility for these events." He added that the members of the Vichy Cabinet were unanimous "in favour of refusing to hand over any hostages in future or to condone reprisals of this nature." Both Laval and Robert Brasillach, a French Fascist who had called for Mandel's trial or execution, were ultimately executed in 1945.

== Legacy and honours ==
A monument to Mandel was erected near the site of his execution, next to the road connecting Fontainebleau to Nemours.

Avenue Georges Mandel, a wide avenue in the 16th Arrondissement in Paris, commencing at the Place du Trocadero, is named in his honor.

== Representation in other media ==
Nicolas Sarkozy wrote a biography, Georges Mandel, moine de la politique, 1994. It was adapted as a French television film, The Last Summer, which starred Jacques Villeret in the title role.

== Book ==
- Carley, Michael Jabara (1999). 1939: The Alliance That Never Was and the Coming of World War II. Chicago: Ivan R. Dee. ISBN 9781461699385.
- Jackson, Julian (2003). The Fall of France. Oxford: Oxford University Press. ISBN 019280300X.
- Churchill, Winston (1949). The Second World War (2nd Volume). New York, New York, USA: Houghton Mifflin Company. ISBN 0395410568.

== Discovery of art looted from Mandel by Nazis in the Gurlitt collection ==
Thomas Couture’s Portrait of a Seated Woman, (c.1850-1855) which was discovered in the Gurlitt trove was identified as having belonged to Georges Mandel from a small hole in the canvas. It was restored to Mandel's heirs in 2019.

Political offices
Preceded by André Mallarmé	Minister of Posts, Telegraphs, and Telephones; 1934–1936	Succeeded by Robert Jardillier
Preceded by Marius Moutet	Minister of Colonies; 1938–1940	Succeeded by Louis Rollin
Preceded by Henri Roy	Minister of the Interior; 1940	Succeeded by Charles Pomaret
