= Bersaillin =

Commune in Bourgogne-Franche-Comté, France

- Commune
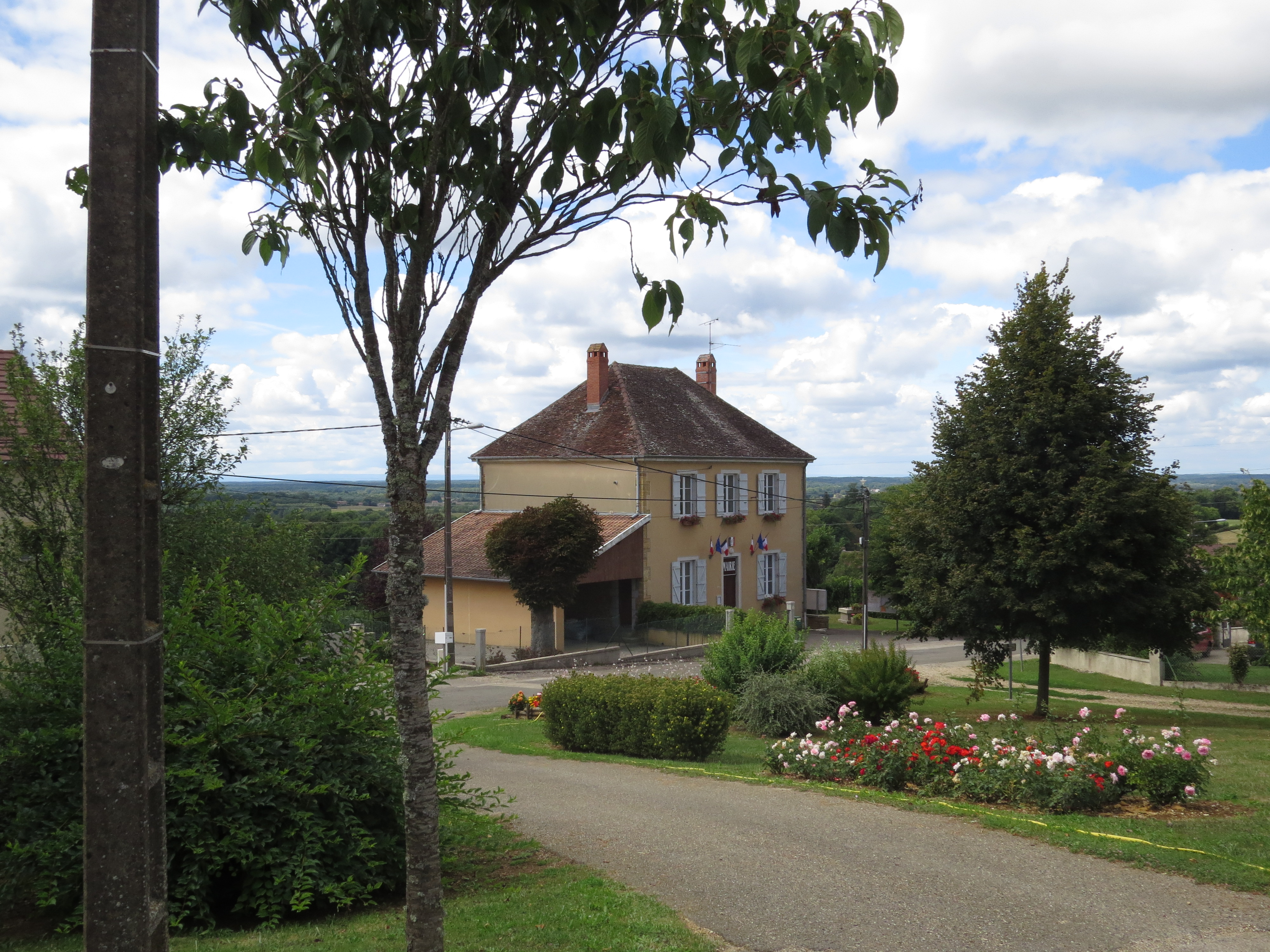
- The town hall in Bersaillin
- Location of Bersaillin
- Location within France Location within Bourgogne-Franche-Comté
- Coordinates: 46°51′37″N 5°36′08″E
- Country: France
- Region: Bourgogne-Franche-Comté
- Department: Jura
- Arrondissement: Dole
- Canton: Bletterans

Government
  - Mayor (2020–2026): Antoine Marcelin
- Area^{1}: 13.90 km^{2} (5.37 sq mi)
- Highest elevation: 300 m (980 ft)
- Lowest elevation: 222 m (728 ft)
- Population (2023): 396
  - Density: 28.5/km^{2} (73.8/sq mi)
- Time zone: UTC+01:00 (CET)
  - Summer (DST): UTC+02:00 (CEST)
- INSEE/Postal code: 39049 /39800
- ^{1} French Land Register data, which excludes lakes, ponds, glaciers > 1 km^{2} (0.386 sq mi or 247 acres) and river estuaries.

Bersaillin (French pronunciation: [bɛʁsajɛ̃]) is a commune in the Jura department in the region of Bourgogne-Franche-Comté in eastern France. In 1973 it absorbed the former communes of Le Bouchaud and Le Viseney.

== Population ==
Historical population
Year	Pop.	±% p.a.
1968	290	—
1975	283	−0.35%
1982	325	+2.00%
1990	305	−0.79%
1999	274	−1.18%
2007	360	+3.47%
2012	397	+1.98%
2017	405	+0.40%
2023	396	−0.37%
Source: INSEE

Population data refer to the area corresponding with the commune as of January 2025.

== See also ==
- Communes of the Jura department
