= National Assembly (French Fourth Republic) =

Lower house of the French Parliament under the Fourth Republic

National Assembly Assemblée nationale
- 1st, 2nd and 3rd legislatures of the French Fourth Republic

Type
- Type: Lower house of the French Parliament

History
- Founded: 28 November 1946
- Disbanded: 8 December 1958
- Preceded by: Constituent Assembly (Provisional Government)
- Succeeded by: National Assembly (Fifth Republic)

Leadership
- President: Vincent Auriol, SFIO (1946–1947)
- Édouard Herriot, PRRS (1947–1954)
- André Le Troquer, SFIO (1954–1955; 1956–1958)
- Pierre Schneiter, MRP (1955)

Structure
- Seats: 626
- Political groups: Filled (594) (Note: Last election of 2 January 1956.) COM–RP (150) SFIO (94) UDSR–RDA (19) PRRS (58) RS (22) RGR–CR (14) MRP–IOM (83) IPAS–PAYSAN (95) UFF (52) Independent (7) Vacant (32) Vacant (1) French Polynesia (1) French Algeria (30) (Note: Due to the Algerian War.)
- Length of term: 4 years

Elections
- Voting system: Party-list proportional representation
- First election: 10 November 1946
- Last election: 2 January 1956

Meeting place
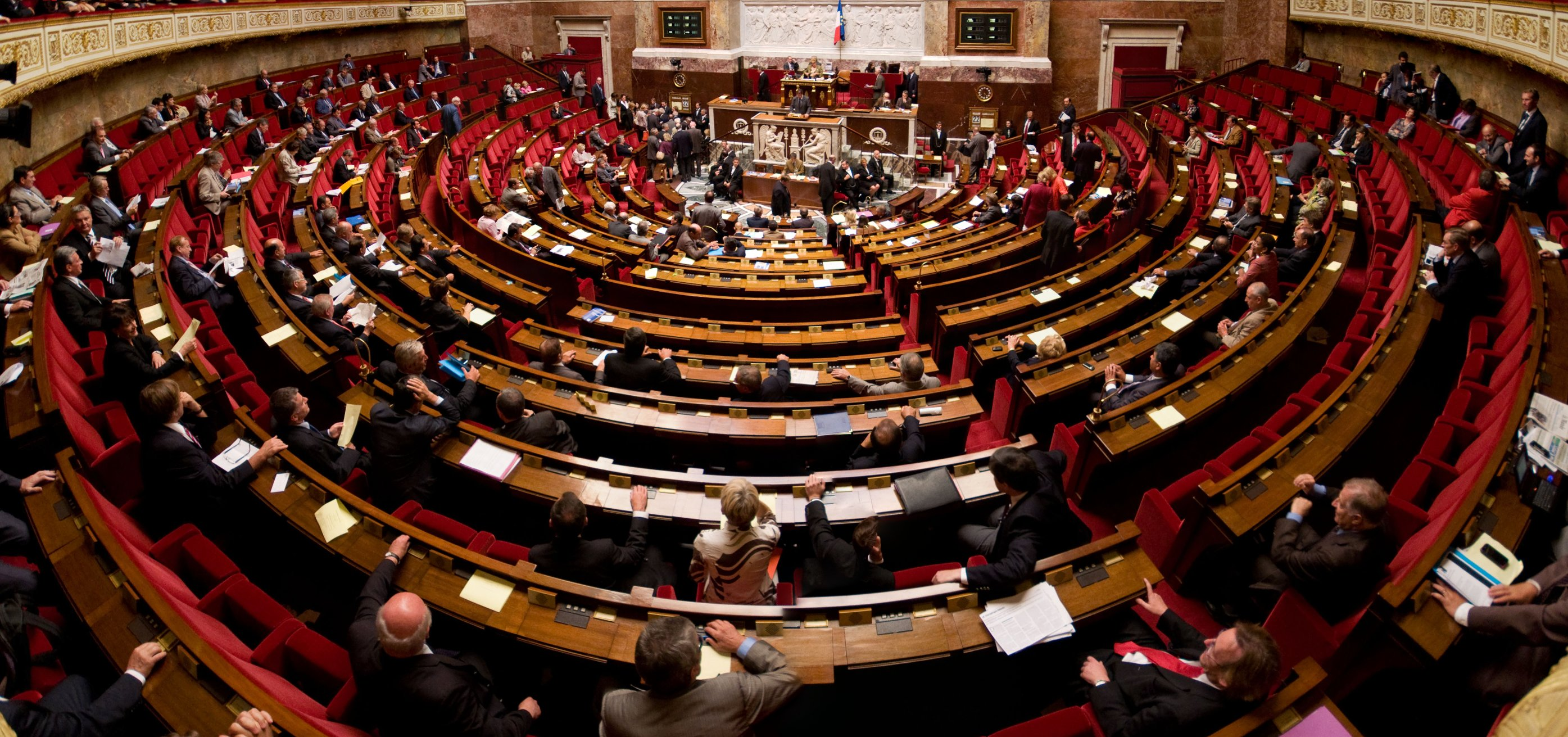
- Salle des Séances; Palais Bourbon; Paris, French Republic

Website
- Archives

The National Assembly (French: Assemblée nationale, [asɑ̃ble nɑsjɔnal]) was the lower house of the French Parliament under the Fourth Republic, with the Council of the Republic being the upper house. It was established by the post-war Constitution of 1946, dissolved by the Constitution of 1958 and replaced with a new chamber bearing the same name.

The institutional nature of the parliamentarian Fourth Republic has been described as a source of political instability by historians and jurists. The proportional voting system of the 1946 legislative election led to a "tripartisme" dominated by the Communists, the Socialists and the Popular Republican Movement, that ended up with the step down of communist ministers from the government in 1947.

The electoral law of 9 May 1951 introduced a voting system based on affiliations: it combined proportional representation with the possibility for the ballots to join forces in the counting and distribution of votes. This system was intended to give a stable majority to the government, as well as to reduce the influence of the Communist Party and the Rally of the French People in the parliament.

By creating the French Union, the 1946 constitution allowed a rising number of black deputies from French West Africa, French Equatorial Africa and French West Indies to be elected in the Assembly: from only one Senegalese representative in the Third Republic, black deputies were 21 in 1946 and 30 in 1958, the year of the founding of the Fifth Republic.

== History ==
The Constitution of 1946, adopted by the Constituent Assembly on 29 September 1946 and approved by referendum on 13 October 1946, led to the creation of a new bicameral parliament. The lower house, named Chamber of Deputies under the Third Republic, became the National Assembly.

== Composition ==
Term	Composition
I (1946 election)	
II (1951 election)	
III (1956 election)	
