= Vourey =

- Commune
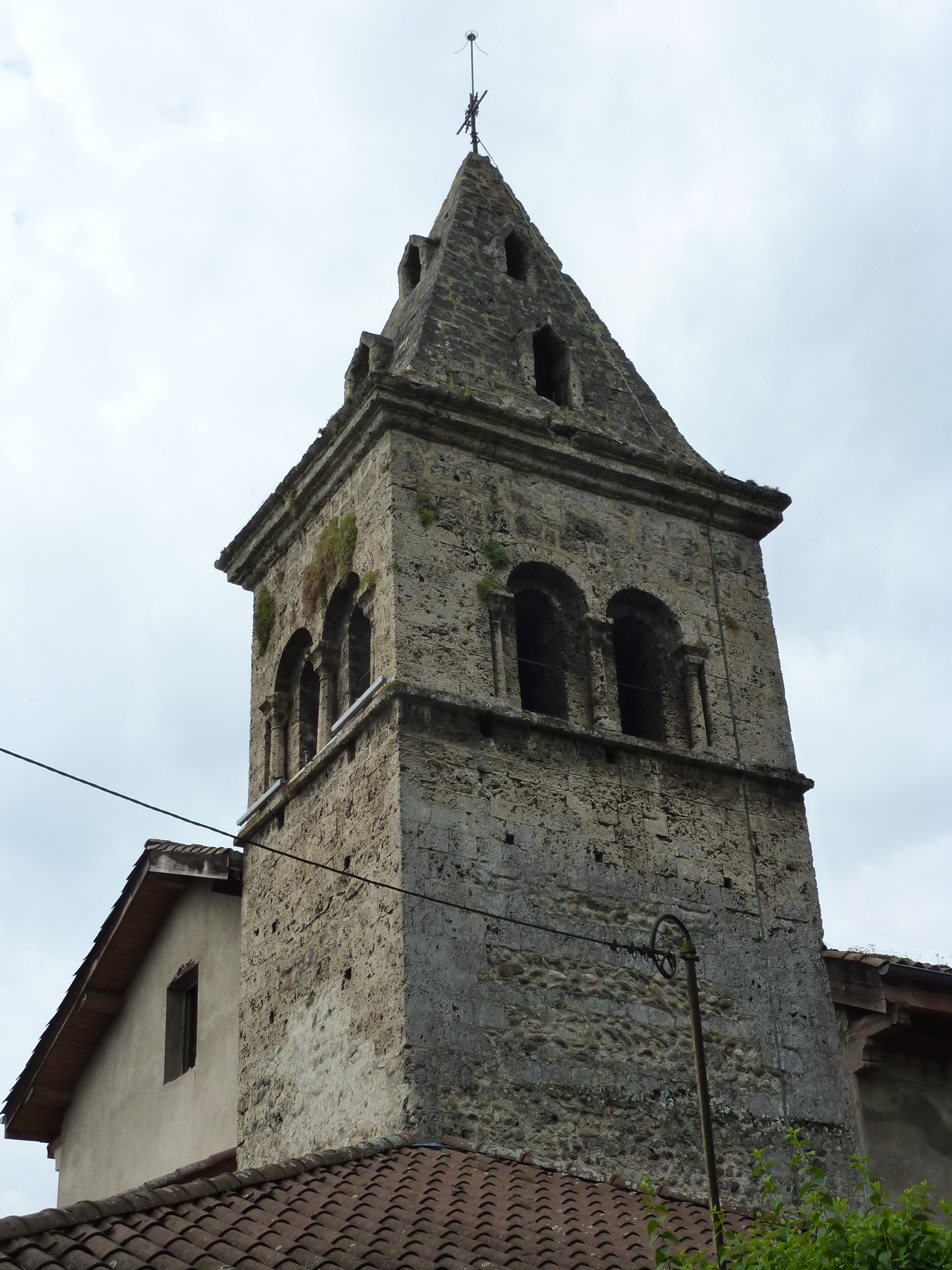
- The bell tower of the church in Vourey

- Coat of arms
- Location of Vourey
- Location within France Location within Auvergne-Rhône-Alpes
- Coordinates: 45°19′18″N 5°31′14″E
- Country: France
- Region: Auvergne-Rhône-Alpes
- Department: Isère
- Arrondissement: Grenoble
- Canton: Tullins
- Intercommunality: Pays Voironnais

Government
  - Mayor (2020–2026): Fabienne Blachot-Minassian
- Area^{1}: 6.88 km^{2} (2.66 sq mi)
- Elevation: 192 m (630 ft)
- Highest elevation: 402 m (1,319 ft)
- Lowest elevation: 181 m (594 ft)
- Population (2023): 1,688
  - Density: 245/km^{2} (635/sq mi)
- Time zone: UTC+01:00 (CET)
  - Summer (DST): UTC+02:00 (CEST)
- INSEE/Postal code: 38566 /38210
- ^{1} French Land Register data, which excludes lakes, ponds, glaciers > 1 km^{2} (0.386 sq mi or 247 acres) and river estuaries.

Vourey (French pronunciation: [vuʁɛ]) is a commune in the Isère department in southeastern France.

== Population ==
Historical population
Year	Pop.	±% p.a.
1968	672	—
1975	761	+1.79%
1982	1,033	+4.46%
1990	1,236	+2.27%
1999	1,548	+2.53%
2007	1,675	+0.99%
2012	1,609	−0.80%
2017	1,705	+1.17%
2023	1,688	−0.17%
Source: INSEE

== See also ==
- Communes of the Isère department
