= René Renoult =

French politician (1867–1946)

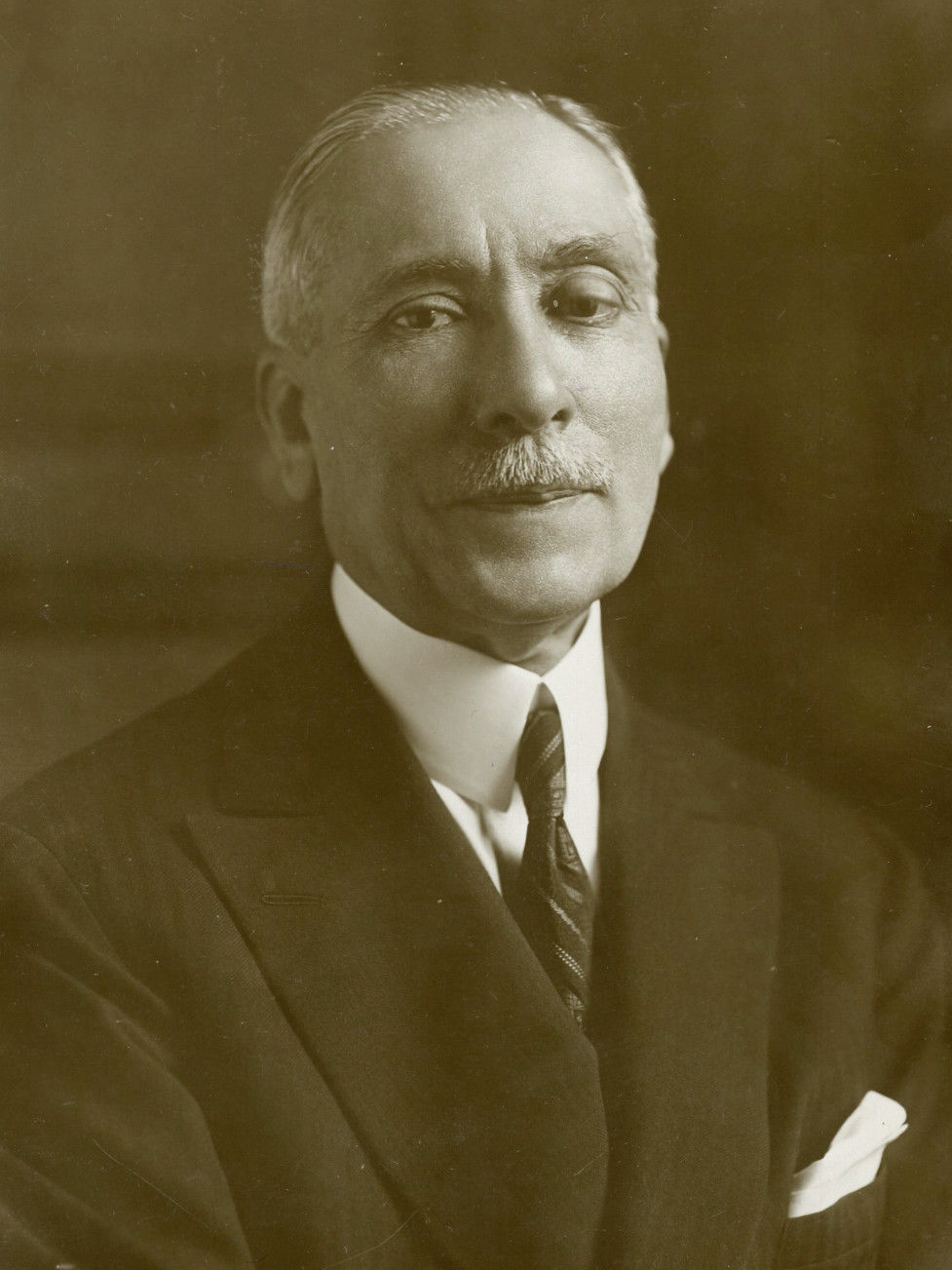
Renoult in 1931

René Renoult (29 August 1867 in Paris – 30 April 1946 in Paris) was a French Minister and lawyer.

== Biography ==
Renoult was the son of Étienne and Élisa Geranger, a female day laborer. He studied at the Faculty of Law in Paris and obtained his doctorate in 1888. He married for the first time with Blanche-Clothilde Wormser in 1910, and a second time with Henriette-Emelie-Céleste Giriat in 1937.

Renoult was a member of the Radical Party. His political career started in 1911, when he became General Counselor of the Lure commune (until 1913). In 1902 he became deputy for the Haute-Saône département (until 1919). From 1920 to 1941 he was Senator of Var.

== Offices ==
- 1889: Chief of cabinet under Charles Floquet, president of the Chamber of Deputies.
- 1903: President of the Radical Party
- 1911–1912: Minister of Labour and Social Security Provisions
- 1913–1914: Minister of the Interior
- 1914: Minister of Finance (during 85 days).
- 1914: Minister of Transportation
- 1924–1926, 1932–1933: Minister of Justice
- 1926: Minister of the Marine.

Political offices
Preceded by Antony Ratier	Minister of Justice; 1924–1925	Succeeded by Théodore Steeg
Preceded by Camille Chautemps	Minister of Justice; 1925–1926	Succeeded by Pierre Laval
Preceded by Paul Reynaud	Minister of Justice; 1932–1933	Succeeded by Abel Gardey
