= Georges Desplas =

French politician (1856–1922)

- Born: 30 January 1856; Bagnères-de-Bigorre, Hautes-Pyrénées, France
- Died: 29 January 1922 (aged 65); Paris, France
- Occupation: Politician

Georges Desplas (30 January 1856 – 29 January 1922) was a French politician. He served as a member of the Chamber of Deputies from 1906 to 1919. He also served as the Minister of Public Works and Transport from 20 March 1917 to 7 September 1917.

During his tenure as the Minister of Public Works, he insisted, against considerable opposition from the grande ecole, that the l'École nationale supérieure des mines de Saint-Étienne should allow women to sit the entrance examination, enabling Anne-Marcelle Kahn to later graduate as a civil engineer of mines in 1919.
