= Laurent Eynac =

French politician (1886–1970)

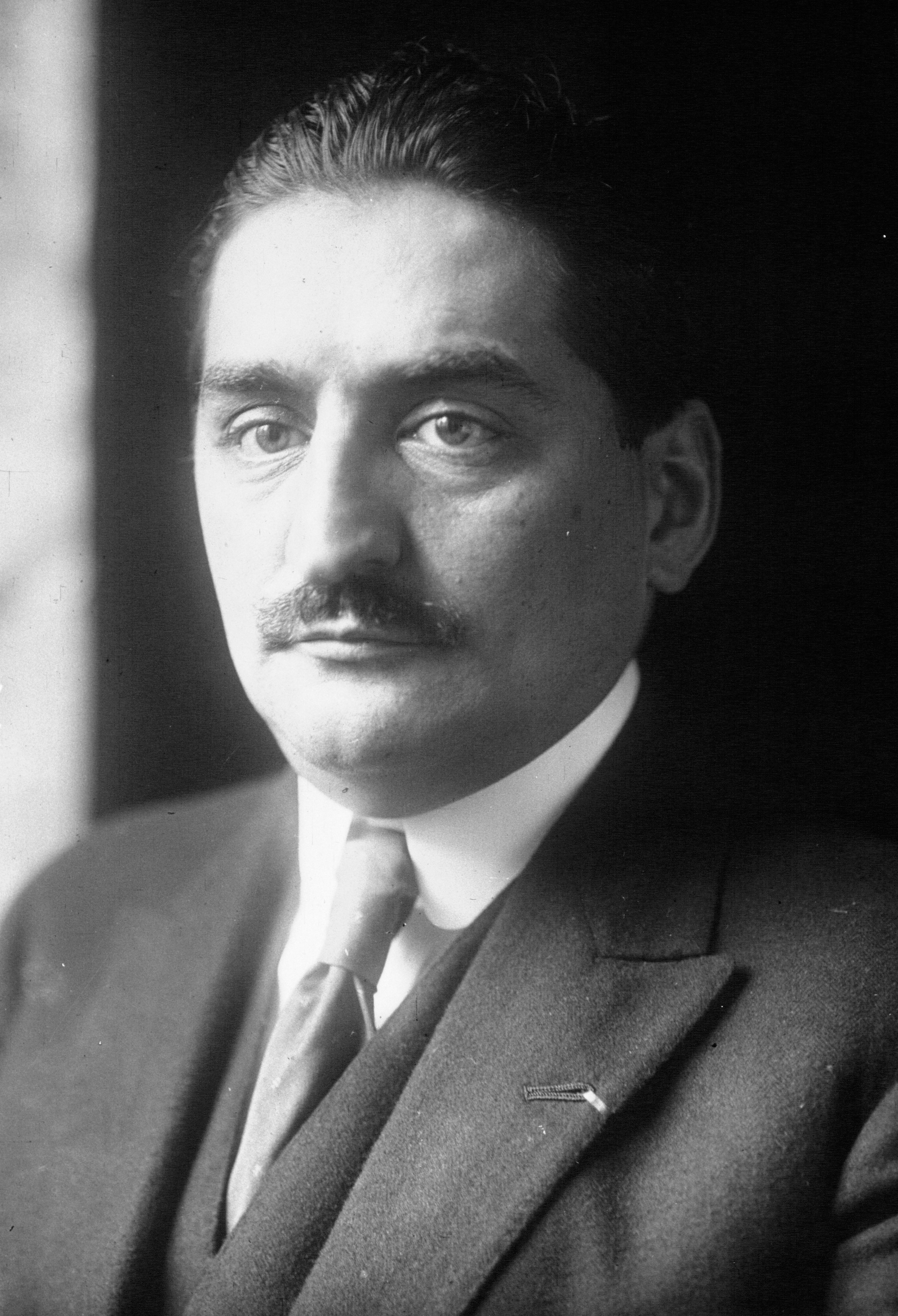

Laurent Eynac (4 October 1886 – 16 December 1970) was a French politician who was appointed Minister of Transportation on 7 June 1935 until 24 January 1936. He was born in Le Monastier-sur-Gazeille, Haute-Loire.

In 1940, Eynac was appointed Minister of the Air in the government of Paul Reynaud. In this role, he served as part of the War Committee put together at early in the Second World War and consisting of Reynaud, President Albert François Lebrun, Naval Minister César Campinchi, War Minister Édouard Daladier, Interior Minister Georges Mandel, Eynac as Air Minister, French Navy chief Admiral François Darlan, Chief of the Air Staff General Joseph Vuillemin and French Army generals Maurice Gamelin and Alphonse Joseph Georges.

== Honors and awards ==
- Commander of the Order of Legion of Honour
- Croix de guerre 1914-1918
- Honour medal of railroads
