= Maurice Deligne =

French politician (1861–1939)

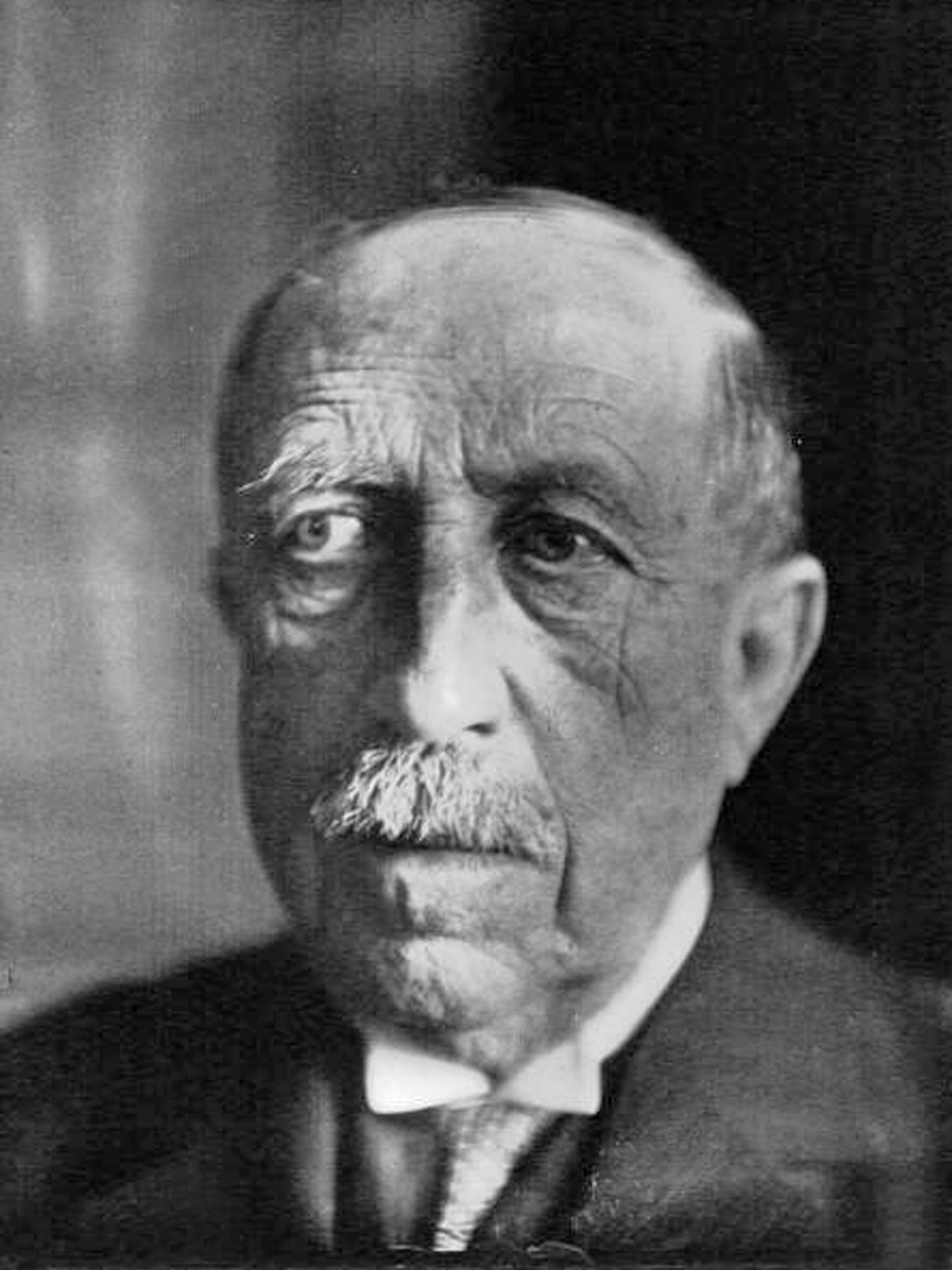
- Born: 7 October 1861; Clary, Nord, France
- Died: 11 July 1939; Paris, France
- Occupation: Politician
- Parent(s): Jules Deligne; Angélique-Augustine Piette

Maurice Deligne (7 October 1861 - 11 July 1939) was a French politician. He served as a member of the Chamber of Deputies from 1928 to 1936, representing Nord. He was also the Minister of Public Works from 27 January 1931 to 16 February 1932.
