= Édouard Herriot =

French Radical politician (1872–1957)

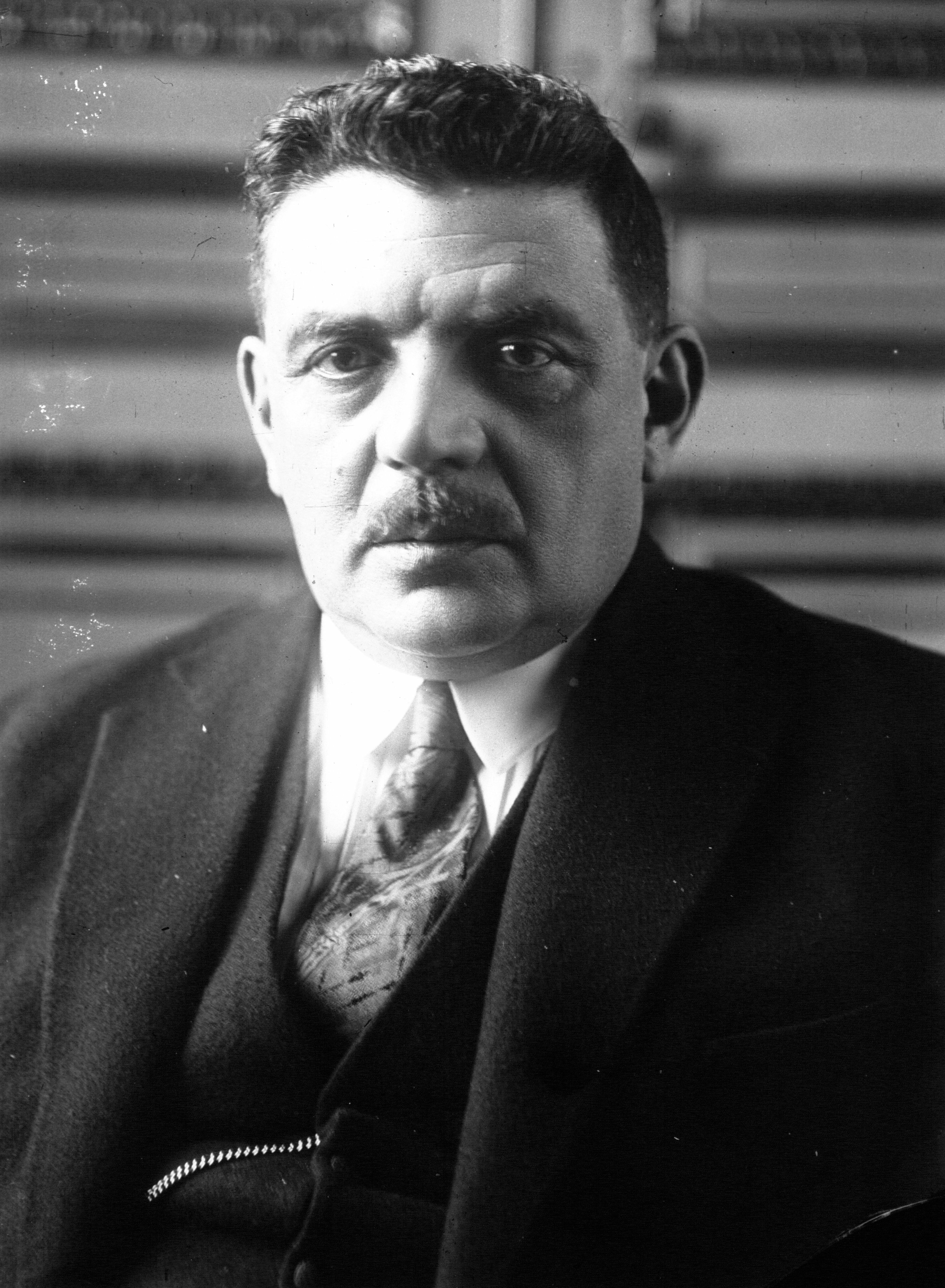
- Herriot in 1924

Prime Minister of France (Note: the term "President of the Council of Ministers of France" was naming of head of government of France in the Third Republic and Fourth Republic periods, naming "Prime Minister of France" is used since Fifth Republic periods, in fact, naming of Prime Minister of France is used in several political regimes era by the foreign press)
- In office 3 June 1932 – 18 December 1932
- President: Albert Lebrun
- Preceded by: André Tardieu
- Succeeded by: Joseph Paul-Boncour
- In office 20 July 1926 – 23 July 1926
- President: Gaston Doumergue
- Preceded by: Aristide Briand
- Succeeded by: Raymond Poincaré
- In office 15 June 1924 – 17 April 1925
- President: Gaston Doumergue
- Preceded by: Frédéric François-Marsal
- Succeeded by: Paul Painlevé

President of the National Assembly
- In office 21 January 1947 – 11 January 1954
- Preceded by: Vincent Auriol
- Succeeded by: André Le Troquer

President of the Chamber of Deputies
- In office 4 June 1936 – 10 July 1940 (Note: Parliament suspended.)
- Preceded by: Fernand Bouisson
- Succeeded by: Félix Gouin (as President of the Provisional Consultative Assembly, 1943)
- In office 22 April 1925 – 20 July 1926
- Preceded by: Paul Painlevé
- Succeeded by: Raoul Péret

Minister of Public Instruction and Beaux-Arts
- In office 23 July 1926 – 1 November 1928
- President: Gaston Doumergue
- Prime Minister: Raymond Poincaré
- Preceded by: Édouard Daladier
- Succeeded by: Pierre Marraud

Mayor of Lyon
- In office 18 May 1945 – 26 March 1957
- Preceded by: Justin Godart
- Succeeded by: Louis Pradel
- In office 3 November 1905 – 20 September 1940
- Preceded by: Victor Augagneur
- Succeeded by: Georges Cohendy

Member of the National Assembly for Rhône
- In office 6 November 1945 – 26 March 1957

Member of the Chamber of Deputies for Rhône
- In office 20 November 1919 – 31 May 1942

Minister of Foreign Affairs
- In office 3 June 1932 – 14 December 1932
- President: Albert Lebrun
- Prime Minister: Himself
- Preceded by: André Tardieu
- Succeeded by: Joseph Paul-Boncour
- In office 19 July 1926 – 21 July 1926
- President: Gaston Doumergue
- Prime Minister: Himself
- Preceded by: Aristide Briand
- Succeeded by: Aristide Briand
- In office 14 June 1924 – 10 April 1925
- President: Gaston Doumergue
- Prime Minister: Himself
- Preceded by: Edmond Lefebvre du Prey
- Succeeded by: Aristide Briand

Member of the Senate
- In office 7 November 1912 – 23 December 1919
- Preceded by: Édouard Millaud
- Succeeded by: Eugène Ruffier

Minister of Public Works
- In office 12 December 1916 – 17 March 1917
- President: Raymond Poincaré
- Prime Minister: Aristide Briand
- Preceded by: Marcel Sembat
- Succeeded by: Georges Desplas

Personal details
- Born: Édouard Marie Herriot; 5 July 1872 Troyes, France
- Died: 26 March 1957 (aged 84) Saint-Genis-Laval, France
- Resting place: Loyasse Cemetery, Lyon
- Party: Radical Party
- Spouse: Blanche Rebatel
- Education: Lycée Louis-le-Grand
- Alma mater: École normale supérieure
- Occupation: Historian

Édouard Marie Herriot (French: [edwaʁ ma.ʁi ɛʁjo]; 5 July 1872 – 26 March 1957) was a French Radical politician of the Third Republic who served three times as Prime Minister (1924–1925; 1926; 1932) and twice as President of the Chamber of Deputies. He led the first Cartel des Gauches. Under the Fourth Republic, he served as President of the National Assembly until 1954. A historian by occupation, Herriot was elected to the Académie Française's eighth seat in 1946. He served as Mayor of Lyon for more than 45 years, from 1905 until his death, except for a brief period from 1940 to 1945, when he saw his movements variously restricted for opposing the Vichy regime.

== Life ==
Herriot was born at Troyes, France on 5 July 1872. As Mayor of Lyon, Herriot improved relations between municipal government and local unions, increased public assistance funds, and began an urban renewal programme, amongst other measures. He died in Lyon on 26 March 1957. He went through a Deathbed conversion to Catholicism with Cardinal Pierre-Marie Gerlier, and was buried at the Loyasse Cemetery "with church ritual".

== Herriot's First Ministry, 14 June 1924 – 17 April 1925 ==
- Édouard Herriot - President of the Council and Minister of Foreign Affairs
- Charles Nollet - Minister of War
- Camille Chautemps - Minister of the Interior
- Étienne Clémentel - Minister of Finance
- Justin Godart - Minister of Labour, Hygiene, Welfare Work, and Social Security Provisions
- René Renoult - Minister of Justice
- Jacques-Louis Dumesnil - Minister of Marine
- François Albert - Minister of Public Instruction and Fine Arts
- Édouard Amédée Bovier-Lapierre - Minister of Pensions
- Henri Queuille - Minister of Agriculture
- Édouard Daladier - Minister of Colonies
- Victor Peytral - Minister of Public Works
- Eugène Raynaldy - Minister of Commerce and Industry
- Victor Dalbiez - Minister of Liberated Regions

Changes

- 3 April 1925 - Anatole de Monzie succeeds Clémentel as Minister of Finance.

== Herriot's Second Ministry, 19–23 July 1926 ==
- Édouard Herriot - President of the Council and Minister of Foreign Affairs
- Paul Painlevé - Minister of War
- Camille Chautemps - Minister of the Interior
- Anatole de Monzie - Minister of Finance
- Louis Pasquet - Minister of Labour, Hygiene, Welfare Work, and Social Security Provisions
- Maurice Colrat - Minister of Justice
- René Renoult - Minister of Marine
- Édouard Daladier - Minister of Public Instruction and Fine Arts
- Georges Bonnet - Minister of Pensions
- Henri Queuille - Minister of Agriculture
- Adrien Dariac - Minister of Colonies
- Orly André-Hesse - Minister of Public Works
- Louis Loucheur - Minister of Commerce and Industry

== Herriot's Third Ministry, 3 June – 18 December 1932 ==
- Édouard Herriot - President of the Council and Minister of Foreign Affairs
- Joseph Paul-Boncour - Minister of War
- Camille Chautemps - Minister of the Interior
- Louis Germain-Martin - Minister of Finance
- Maurice Palmade - Minister of Budget
- Albert Dalimier - Minister of Labour and Social Security Provisions
- René Renoult - Minister of Justice
- Georges Leygues - Minister of Marine
- Léon Meyer - Minister of Merchant Marine
- Paul Painlevé - Minister of Air
- Anatole de Monzie - Minister of National Education
- Aimé Berthod - Minister of Pensions
- Abel Gardey - Minister of Agriculture
- Albert Sarraut - Minister of Colonies
- Édouard Daladier - Minister of Public Works
- Justin Godart - Minister of Public Health
- Henri Queuille - Minister of Posts, Telegraphs, and Telephones
- Julien Durand - Minister of Commerce and Industry

=== Denial of Famine in Ukraine ===
Herriot's denial of the Ukrainian Famine of 1932-33 came after a visit to Ukraine between 26 August and 9 September 1933, shortly after leaving the French Prime Ministership. Herriot denied accounts of the famine and said that Soviet Ukraine was "like a garden in full bloom".

Furthermore, he announced to the press that there was no famine in Ukraine, that he did not see any trace of hunger, and that the allegations of starving millions were being spread by adversaries of the Soviet Union. "When one believes that the Ukraine is devastated by famine, allow me to shrug my shoulders", he declared. The 13 September 1933 issue of Pravda was able to write that Herriot "categorically contradicted the lies of the bourgeoisie press in connection with a famine in the USSR."

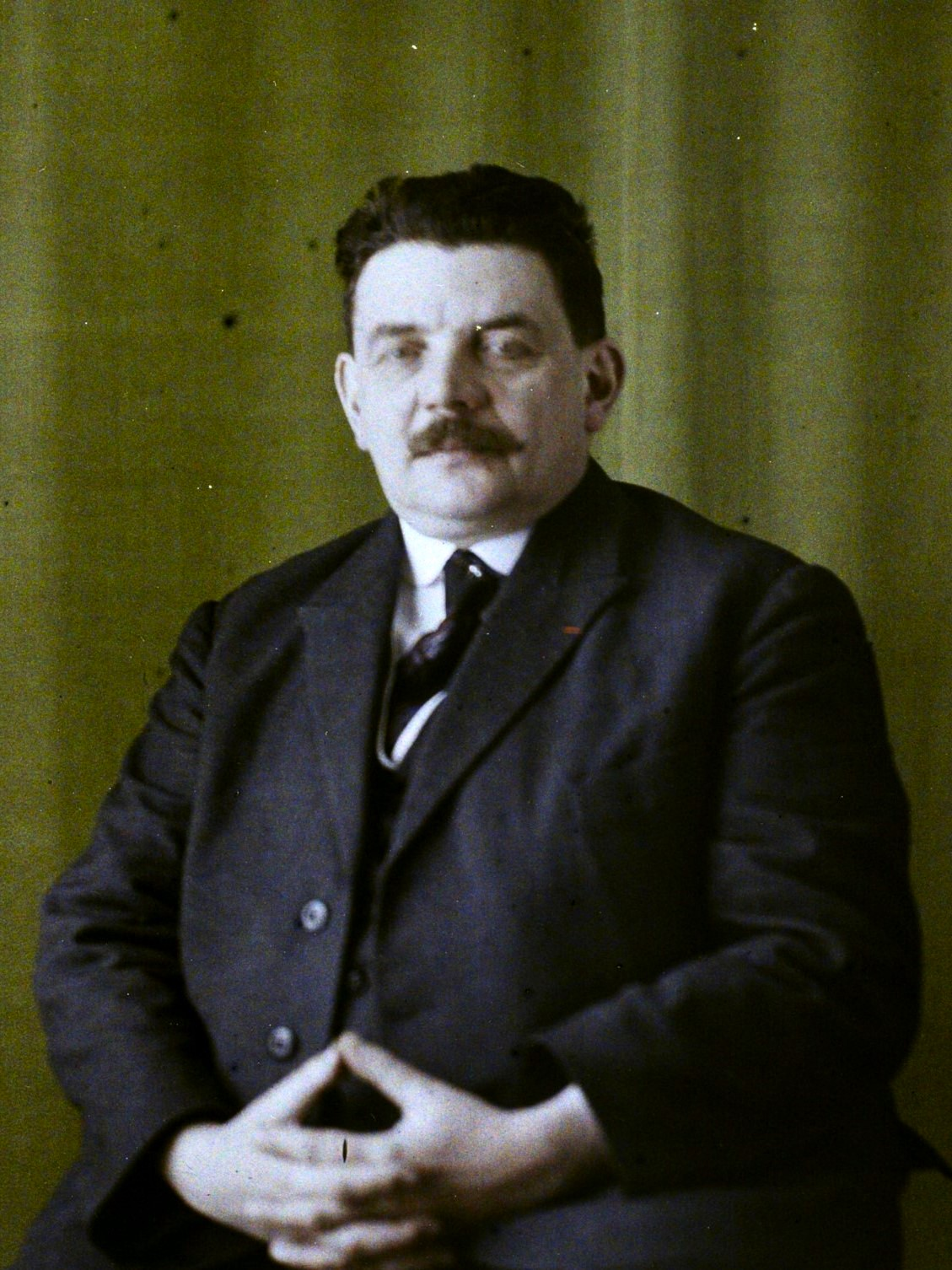
Autochrome by Georges Chevalier, 1923

== Political career ==
Governmental functions

Président of the Council of Ministers : 1924–1925 / 19–21 July 1926 / June–December 1932.

Minister of Transport, Public Works and Supply : 1916–1917.

Minister of Education and Fine Arts : 1926–1928.

Minister of Foreign Affairs : 1924–1925 / 19–21 July 1926 / June–December 1932.

Minister of State : 1934–1936.

Electoral mandates

National Assembly of France

President of the National Assembly of France : 1947–1954.

Member of the National Assembly of France for Rhône : 1946–1957 (He died in 1957). Elected in 1946, reelected in 1951, 1956.

Constitutional Assembly

Member of the Constitutional Assembly for Rhône : 1945–1946. Elected in 1945, reelected in June 1946.

Chamber of Deputies of France

President of the Chamber of Deputies of France : 1925–1926 / 1936–1940.

Member of the Chamber of Deputies of France for Rhône : 1919–1942 (Dissolution of Parliament by Philippe Pétain in 1942). Elected in 1919, reelected in 1924, 1928, 1932, 1936.

Senate of France

Senator of Rhône : 1912–1919. Elected in 1911.

General council

General councillor of Rhône : 1945–1951.

Municipal Council

Mayor of Lyon : 1905–1940 (Deposition by Vichy regime in 1940) / 1945–1957 (He died in 1957). Reelected in 1908, 1912, 1919, 1925, 1929, 1935, 1945, 1947, 1953.

Municipal councillor of Lyon : 1904–1940 (Deposition by the Vichy regime in 1940) / 1945–1957 (He died in 1957). Reelected in 1908, 1912, 1919, 1925, 1929, 1935, 1945, 1947, 1953.

Political functions

President of the Radical Party : 1919–1926 / 1931–1936 / 1948–1953 / 1955–1957.

== Legacy ==
Herriot was declared an honorary citizen of the city of Veliki Bečkerek (today Zrenjanin) in 1933. There is also a street with his name in Zrenjanin.

His visit to a church in Kiev, where a fake religious service was organized for the occasion, is described in "The Mechanical Lions", one of the stories in A Tomb for Boris Davidovich by Danilo Kiš.

== See also ==
- Foire de Lyon
- Interwar France

== Notes ==
Political offices
Preceded by Marcel Sembat	Minister of Public Works and Transport; 1916–1917	Succeeded by Georges Desplas
Preceded by —	Minister of Supply; 1916–1917	Succeeded by Maurice Viollette
Preceded by Frédéric François-Marsal	Prime Minister of France; 1924–1925	Succeeded by Paul Painlevé
Preceded by Edmond Lefebvre du Prey	Minister of Foreign Affairs; 1924–1925	Succeeded by Aristide Briand
Preceded by Paul Painlevé	President of the Chamber of Deputies; 1925–1926	Succeeded by Raoul Péret
Preceded by Aristide Briand	Prime Minister of France; 1926	Succeeded by Raymond Poincaré
Preceded by Aristide Briand	Minister of Foreign Affairs; 1926	Succeeded by Aristide Briand
Preceded by Édouard Daladier	Minister of Public Instruction; 1926–1928	Succeeded by Pierre Marraud
Preceded by André Tardieu	Prime Minister of France; 1932	Succeeded by Joseph Paul-Boncour
Preceded by André Tardieu	Minister of Foreign Affairs; 1932	Succeeded by Joseph Paul-Boncour
Preceded by —	Minister of State; 1934–1936	Succeeded by —
Preceded by Fernand Bouisson	President of the Chamber of Deputies; 1936–1940	Succeeded by —
Preceded by Vincent Auriol	President of the National Assembly; 1947–1954	Succeeded by André Le Troquer
New office	President of the Parliamentary Assembly of the Council of Europe; 1949	Succeeded by Paul-Henri Spaak
