= Louis Germain-Martin =

French politician (1872–1948)

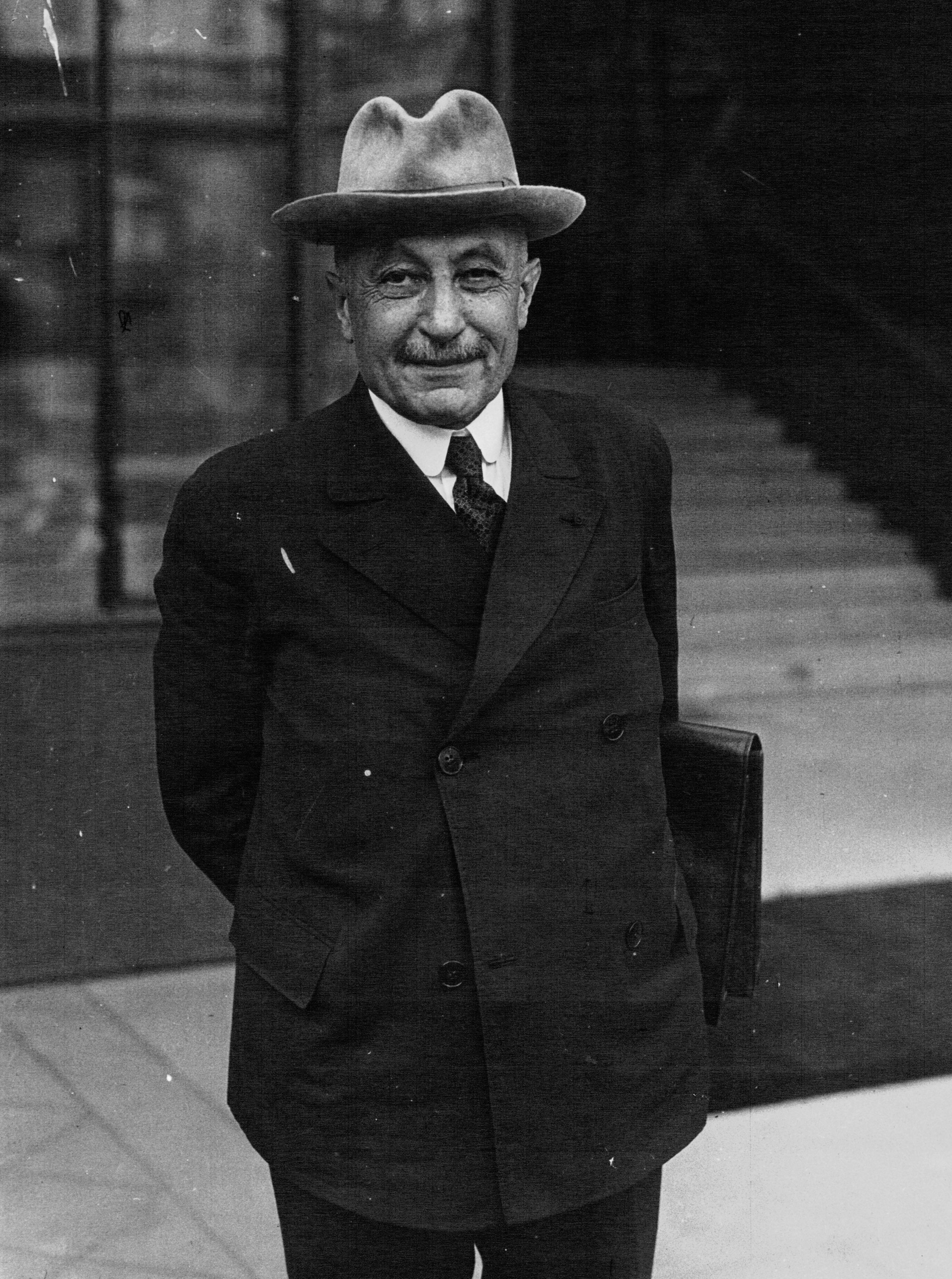
Louis Germain-Martin (1932)

Louis Germain-Martin (French pronunciation: [lwi ʒɛʁmɛ̃ maʁtɛ̃]; 7 November 1872, in Le Puy-en-Velay, Haute-Loire – 4 October 1948, in Paris) was an Independent Radical French politician. He was Minister of Post and Telecommunications in the government of André Tardieu, and later a Budget Minister, before serving three times as Finance minister for much of the first half of the 1930s.

On 23 January 1941, Germain-Martin was made a member of the National Council of Vichy France.
