= Pierre Laval =

French politician (1883–1945)

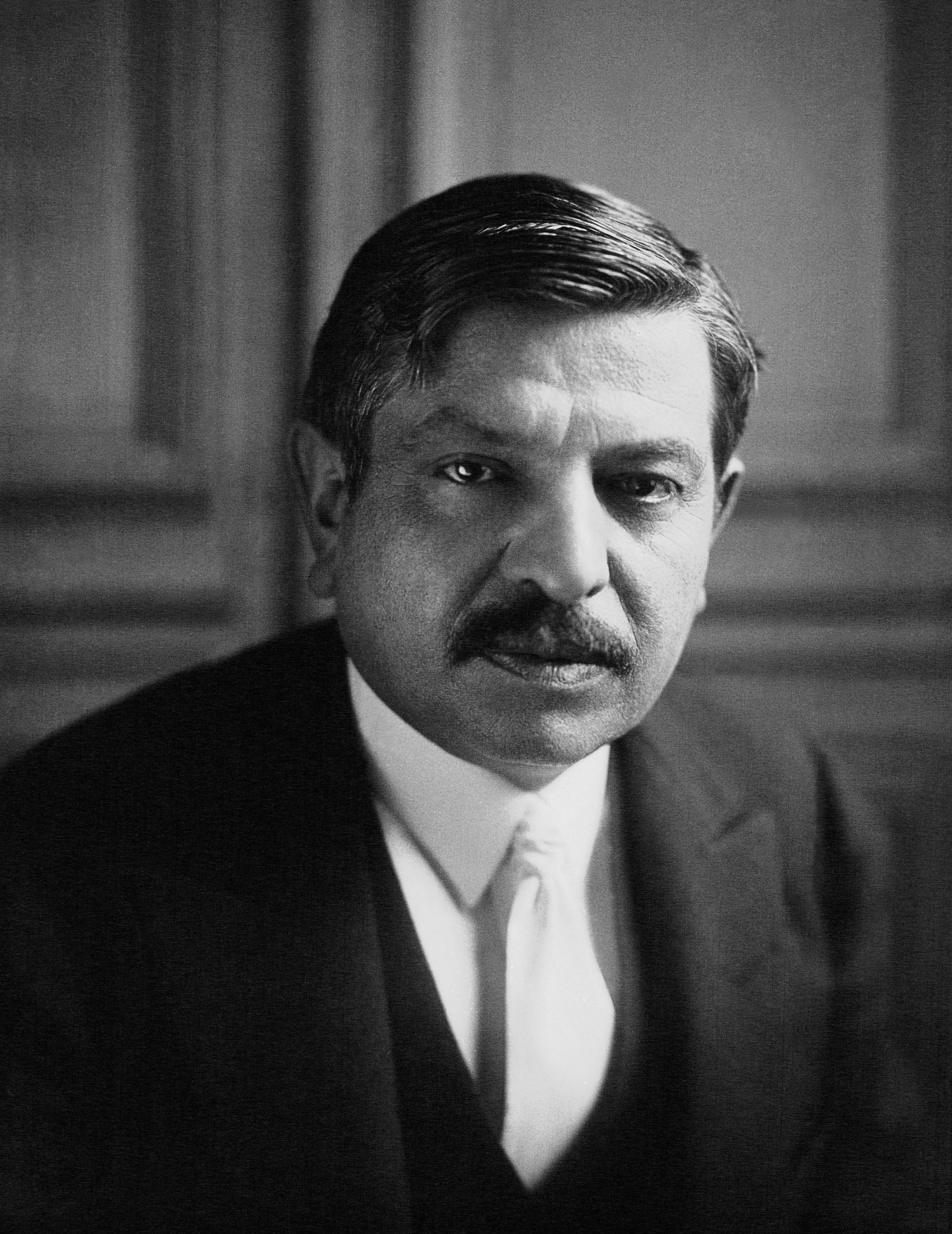
- Laval in 1931

Prime Minister of France
- In office 18 April 1942 – 19 August 1944
- Chief of the State: Philippe Pétain
- Preceded by: Philippe Pétain
- Succeeded by: Charles de Gaulle (as Chairman of the Provisional Government)
- In office 7 June 1935 – 24 January 1936
- President: Albert Lebrun
- Preceded by: Fernand Bouisson
- Succeeded by: Albert Sarraut
- In office 27 January 1931 – 20 February 1932
- President: Gaston Doumergue; Paul Doumer
- Preceded by: Théodore Steeg
- Succeeded by: André Tardieu

Deputy Prime Minister of France
- In office 11 July 1940 – 13 December 1940
- Prime Minister: Philippe Pétain
- Preceded by: Philippe Pétain
- Succeeded by: Pierre-Étienne Flandin

Personal details
- Born: Pierre Jean Marie Laval; 28 June 1883 Châteldon, France
- Died: 15 October 1945 (aged 62) Fresnes Prison, Fresnes, France
- Cause of death: Execution by firing squad
- Resting place: Montparnasse Cemetery
- Party: SFIO (1914–23); Independent (1923–45)
- Spouse: Jeanne Claussat (m. 1909)
- Relations: Joseph Claussat (brother-in-law); René de Chambrun (son-in-law)
- Children: Josée Laval
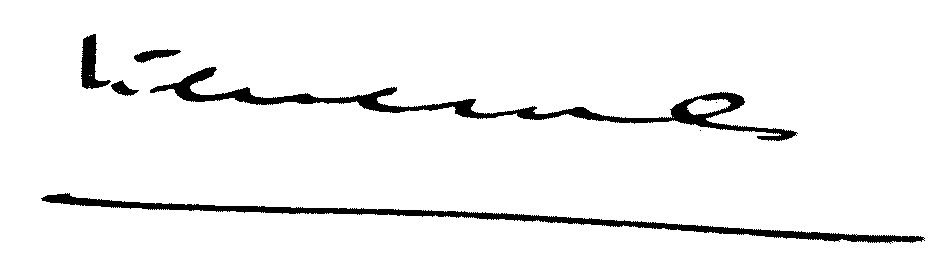
- Signature

Pierre Jean Marie Laval (French: [pjɛʁ laval]; 28 June 1883 – 15 October 1945) was a French politician. He served as Prime Minister of France three times: 1931–1932 and 1935–1936 during the Third Republic, and 1942–1944 during Vichy France. After the war, Laval was tried as a Nazi collaborator and executed for treason.

A socialist early in his life, Laval became a lawyer in 1909 and was famous for his defence of strikers, trade unionists and leftists from government prosecution. In 1914, he was elected to the Chamber of Deputies as a member of the French Section of the Workers' International (SFIO), and he remained committed to his pacifist convictions during the First World War. After his defeat in the 1919 election, Laval left the SFIO and became mayor of Aubervilliers. In 1924 he returned to the Chamber as an independent, and was elected to the Senate three years later. He also held a series of governmental positions, including Minister of Public Works, Minister of Justice and Minister of Labour. In 1931, Laval became prime minister, but his government fell only a year later.

Laval joined the conservative government of Gaston Doumergue in 1934 and served as Minister of the Colonies and then Foreign Minister. In 1935, Laval again became prime minister. Seeking to contain Nazi Germany, he pursued foreign policies favourable to Italy and the Soviet Union, but his handling of the Abyssinia Crisis, which was widely denounced as appeasement of Benito Mussolini, prompted his resignation in 1936.

After France's defeat by the blitzkrieg invasion of Nazi Germany, Laval, by this time a well-known fascist sympathizer, served in prominent roles in Philippe Pétain's Vichy France, first as the vice-president of the Council of Ministers from July 1940 to December 1940 and later as the head of government from April 1942 to August 1944.

After the Liberation of France in 1944, Laval was imprisoned by the Germans. In April 1945, he fled to Spain but was soon extradited to France, where he was arrested by the French government. After what was criticised as a flawed trial, Laval was found guilty of plotting against the security of the state and of collaboration with the Nazis and was sentenced to death. After a thwarted suicide attempt, Laval was executed by firing squad in October 1945.

== Early life ==
Pierre Jean Marie Laval was born on 28 June 1883 in Châteldon, near Vichy in the northern part of Auvergne, the son of Gilbert Laval and Claudine Tournaire. His father worked as a café proprietor and postman. The family was comfortably off compared to the rest of the village: the café also served as a hostel and a butcher's shop, and Gilbert Laval owned a vineyard and horses. The last name "Laval" was widespread in the region at that time. The family branch was commonly named Laval-Tournaire, and his father had himself called "Baptiste Moulin".

Laval was educated at the village school in Châteldon. At age 15, he was sent to the lycée Saint-Louis in Paris where he obtained his baccalauréat in July 1901. He then continued his studies in Southwestern France, in Bordeaux and Bayonne, where he learnt Spanish and met Pierre Cathala. Returning to Lyon, he spent the next year reading for a degree in zoology and served as a supervisor in various collèges and lycées of Lyon, Saint-Étienne and Autun to pay for his studies.

Laval joined the socialist Central Revolutionary Committee in 1903, while he was living in Saint-Étienne, 55 km (34 mi) southwest of Lyon. During this period, Laval became familiar with the left-wing doctrines of Georges Sorel and Hubert Lagardelle. "I was never a very orthodox socialist", he declared more than forty years later in 1945, "by which I mean that I was never much of a Marxist. My socialism was much more a socialism of the heart than a doctrinal socialism ... I was much more interested in men, their jobs, their misfortunes and their conflicts than in the digressions of the great German pontiff."

In 1903, he was called up for military service and, after serving in the ranks, was discharged for varicose veins. Laval returned to Paris in 1907 at the age of 24. In April 1913 he said that "barrack-based armies [were] incapable of the slightest effort, because they are badly-trained and, above all, badly commanded." Laval favoured abolition of the army and replacement by a citizens' militia.

== Lawyer ==
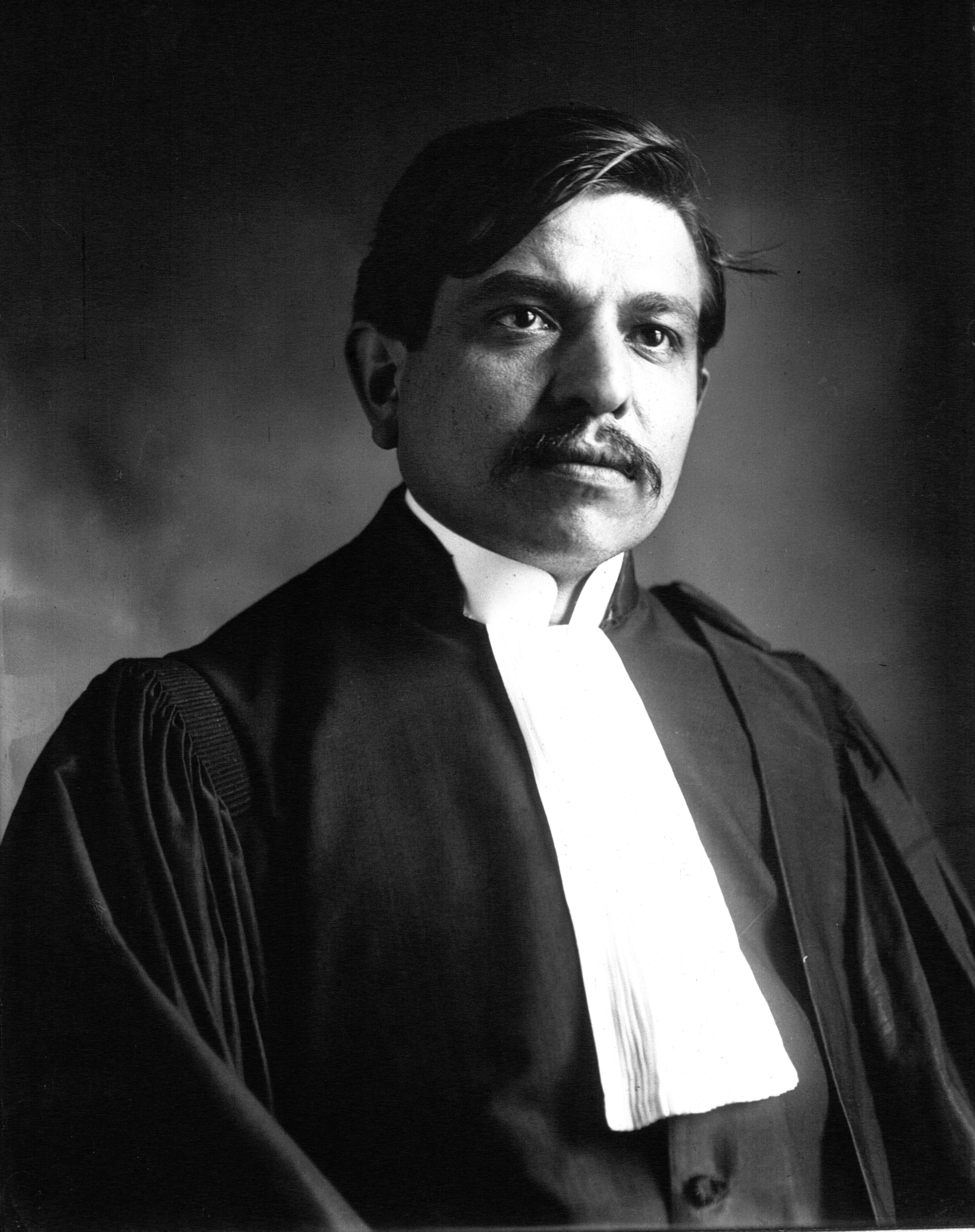
Pierre Laval in 1913

Abandoning natural science studies, Laval eventually turned to law and became in 1909 a "lawyer of the poor people", who was near syndicalists of the CGT. The years before the First World War were characterised by labour unrest, and Laval defended strikers, trade unionists and left-wing agitators against government attempts to prosecute them. At a trade union conference, Laval said:

I am a comrade among comrades, a worker among workers. I am not one of those lawyers who are mindful of their bourgeois origin even when attempting to deny it. I am not one of those high-brow attorneys who engage in academic controversies and pose as intellectuals. I am proud to be what I am. A lawyer in the service of manual laborers who are my comrades, a worker like them, I am their brother. Comrades, I am a manual lawyer.

The first case that led him to fame was the acquittal of Gustave Manhès, a revolutionary trade unionist who had been charged with possession of explosives and anarchist manuals.

Laval married Jeanne Claussat in 1909, the daughter of the Socialist politician Dr Joseph Claussat. Their only child, a daughter named Josée, was born in 1911. Josée married René de Chambrun, whose uncle, Nicholas Longworth III, married Alice Roosevelt, the daughter of US President Theodore Roosevelt. Although Laval's wife came from a political family, she never participated in politics. Laval was generally considered to be devoted to his family.

In 1911, he stood for the National Assembly in the Neuilly-Boulogne electoral district and caused the conservative candidate Édouard Nortier to win since Laval stood in the second round despite the Radical candidate, Alexandre Percin, doing so as well.

== First World War ==
=== Socialist deputy for Seine ===
In April 1914, as fear of war swept the nation, the Socialists and Radicals geared up their electoral campaign in defence of peace. Their leaders were Jean Jaurès and Joseph Caillaux. The Bloc des Gauches ("Lefts Bloc") denounced the law passed in July 1913 that extended compulsory military service from two to three years.

In the 1914 legislative election, held three months before the outbreak of World War I, the trade unions sought Laval as the Socialist candidate for the Seine, the district comprising Paris and its suburbs. Laval was elected to the Chamber of Deputies in the second electoral district of Saint-Denis. At nearly 31, he was the youngest member of the Chamber.

The Radicals, with the support of Socialists, held the majority in the French Chamber of Deputies. Together, they hoped to avert war, but the assassination of Archduke Franz Ferdinand of Austria on 28 June 1914 and of Jean Jaurès on 31 July 1914 shattered those hopes. Laval's brother, Jean, died in the first months of the war.

Laval was listed in the Carnet B, a compilation of potentially subversive elements that might hinder mobilisation. In the name of national unity, Minister of the Interior Jean-Louis Malvy, despite pressure from chiefs of staff, refused to have anyone apprehended. Laval remained true to his pacifist convictions during the war. In December 1915, Jean Longuet, the grandson of Karl Marx, proposed to Socialist parliamentarians that they communicate with socialists of other states in the hope of pressing governments into a negotiated peace. Laval signed on, but the motion was defeated.

With France's resources geared for war, goods were scarce or overpriced. On 30 January 1917, in the National Assembly Laval called upon Supply Minister Édouard Herriot to deal with the inadequate coal supply in Paris. When Herriot said, "If I could, I would unload the barges myself", Laval retorted, "Do not add ridicule to ineptitude". Those words delighted the Assembly and attracted the attention of Georges Clemenceau but left the relationship between Laval and Herriot permanently strained.

=== Stockholm, "polar star" ===
Laval scorned the conduct of the war and the poor supply of troops in the field. When mutinies broke out after General Robert Nivelle's offensive of April 1917 at Chemin des Dames, he spoke in defence of the mutineers. When Marcel Cachin and Marius Moutet returned from St. Petersburg in June 1917 with the invitation to a socialist convention in Stockholm, Laval saw a chance for peace. In an address to the Assembly, he urged the chamber to allow a delegation to go: "Yes, Stockholm, in response to the call of the Russian Revolution.... Yes, Stockholm, for peace.... Yes, Stockholm the polar star." The request was denied.

The hope of peace in spring 1917 was overwhelmed by discovery of traitors, some real and some imagined, as with Malvy, who became a suspect because he had refused to arrest Frenchmen on the Carnet B. Laval's "Stockholm, étoile polaire" speech had not been forgotten. Many of Laval's acquaintances, the publishers of the anarchist Le Bonnet rouge and other pacifists were arrested or interrogated. Though Laval frequented pacifist circles (it was said that he was acquainted with Leon Trotsky), the authorities did not pursue him. His status as a deputy, his caution and his friendships protected him. In November 1917, Clemenceau became prime minister and offered Laval a post in his government. Laval refused, as the Socialist Party refused to enter any government, but he questioned the wisdom of such a policy in a meeting of Socialist deputies.

== Initial postwar career ==
=== From Socialist to Independent ===
In the 1919 elections the Socialists' record of pacifism, their opposition to Clemenceau and anxiety arising from the excesses of the Bolshevik Revolution in Russia contributed to their defeat by the conservative National Bloc. Laval lost his seat in the Chamber of Deputies.

The General Confederation of Labour (Confédération Générale du Travail - CGT), with 2,400,000 members, launched a general strike in 1920, which petered out with thousands of workers being laid off. In response, the government sought to dissolve the CGT. Laval, with Joseph Paul-Boncour as chief counsel, defended the union's leaders and saved the union by appealing to Interior Minister Théodore Steeg and Commerce and Industry Minister Auguste Isaac.

Laval's relations with the Socialist Party drew to an end. The last years with the Socialist caucus, combined with the party's disciplinary policies, eroded Laval's attachment to the cause. With the Bolshevik victory in the Russian Civil War, the party was changing. At the Congress of Tours in December 1920, the Socialists split into two ideological components: the French Communist Party (SFIC, later PC-SFIC), which was inspired by Moscow, and the more moderate French Section of the Workers' International (SFIO). Laval let his membership lapse and did not take sides as both factions battled over the legacy of Jean Jaurès.

=== Mayor of Aubervilliers ===
In 1923, Aubervilliers, north of Paris, needed a mayor. As a former deputy of the constituency, Laval was an obvious candidate. To be eligible for election, Laval bought farmland, Les Bergeries. Few were aware of his defection from the Socialists. Laval was also asked by the local SFIO and Communists to head their lists. Laval chose to run under his own list of former Socialists whom he had convinced to leave the party and to work for him. The independent Socialist Party of sorts existed only in Aubervilliers. In a four-way race, Laval won in the second round. He served as mayor of Aubervilliers until just before his death.

Laval was seen as malin; a joke stated that he was so clever that he was born with a name that is spelled the same from left or from right. Laval won over those whom he had defeated by cultivating personal contacts. He developed a network among the humble and the well-to-do in Aubervilliers and with mayors of neighbouring towns. He was the only independent politician in the suburb and avoided entering the ideological war between socialists and communists.

=== Independent Deputy for Seine ===
In the 1924 legislative elections, the SFIO and the Radicals formed a national coalition, known as the Cartel des Gauches. Laval headed a list of independent socialists in the Seine. The Cartel won, and Laval regained a seat in the National Assembly. His first act was to bring back Joseph Caillaux, a former prime minister, Cabinet member and member of the National Assembly who had once been the star of the Radical Party. Clemenceau had had Caillaux arrested toward the end of the war for collusion with the enemy. Caillaux spent two years in prison and lost his civic rights. Laval successfully fought for Caillaux's pardon, and Caillaux became an influential patron.

== Member of government ==
=== Minister and senator ===
Laval's reward for support of the Cartel was appointment as Minister of Public Works in the government of Paul Painlevé in April 1925, but six months later, the government collapsed. Laval from then on belonged to the club of former ministers from which new ministers were drawn. Between 1925 and 1926, Laval participated three more times in governments of Aristide Briand, once as under-secretary to the Prime Minister and twice as Minister of Justice (garde des sceaux). When he first became Minister of Justice, Laval abandoned his law practice to avoid a conflict of interest.

Laval's momentum was frozen after 1926 by a reshuffling of the Cartel majority orchestrated by the Radical-Socialist mayor and deputy of Lyon, Édouard Herriot. Founded in 1901, the Radical Party became the hinge faction of the Third Republic, and its support or defection often meant the survival or the collapse of governments. Through that latest swing, Laval was excluded from the government of France for four years. Author Gaston Jacquemin suggested that Laval chose not to partake in a Herriot government, which he judged to be incapable of handling the financial crisis. Although 1926 marked the definitive break between Laval and the left, he maintained friends on the left.

In 1927, Laval was elected Senator for the Seine, which withdrew him from and placed himself above the political battles for majorities in the Chamber of Deputies. He longed for a constitutional reform to strengthen the executive branch and to eliminate political instability, a major flaw of the Third Republic.

On 2 March 1930, Laval returned as Minister of Labour in the second André Tardieu government. Tardieu and Laval knew each other from the days of Clemenceau and had come to appreciate each other's qualities. Tardieu needed men he could trust since his previous government had collapsed a little over a week earlier because of the defection of Labour Minister Louis Loucheur. However, when the Radical Socialist Camille Chautemps failed to form a viable government, Tardieu was called back.

=== Personal investments ===
From 1927 to 1930, Laval began to accumulate a sizeable personal fortune. After the war, his wealth resulted in charges that he had used his political position to line his own pockets. "I have always thought", he wrote to the examining magistrate on 11 September 1945, "that a soundly based material independence, if not indispensable, gives those statesmen who possess it a much greater political independence". Until 1927, his principal source of income had been his fees as a lawyer and in that year, they totalled 113,350 francs, according to his income tax returns. Between August 1927 and June 1930, he undertook large-scale investments in various enterprises that totalled 51 million francs. Not all of that money was his own, but some came from a group of financiers that had the backing of an investment trust, the Union Syndicale et Financière, as well as two banks, the Comptoir Lyon Allemand and the Banque Nationale de Crédit.

Two of the investments that Laval and his backers acquired were provincial newspapers, Le Moniteur du Puy-de-Dôme and its associated printing works at Clermont-Ferrand, and the Lyon Républicain. The circulation of the Moniteur had stood at 27,000 in 1926 before Laval took it over. By 1933, it had more than doubled, peaking at 58,250 but declining thereafter. Profits varied, but during the 17 years of his control, Laval earned some 39 million francs in income from the paper and the printing works combined. The renewed plant was valued at 50 million francs, which led the High Court expert in 1945 to say with some justification that it had been "an excellent deal for him".

=== Minister of Labour and Social Insurance ===
More than 150,000 textile workers were on strike, and violence was feared. As Minister of Public Works in 1925, Laval had ended the strike of mine workers. Tardieu hoped he could do the same as Minister of Labour. The conflict was settled without bloodshed. The Socialist politician Léon Blum, never one of Laval's allies, conceded that Laval's "intervention was skilful, opportune and decisive".

Social insurance had been on the agenda for ten years. It had passed the Chamber of Deputies but not the Senate, in 1928. Tardieu gave Laval until May Day to get the project through. The date was chosen to stifle the agitation of Labour Day. Laval's first effort went into clarifying the muddled collection of texts. He then consulted employer and labour organisations. Laval had to reconcile the divergent views of Chamber and Senate. "Had it not been for Laval's unwearying patience", Laval's associate Tissier wrote, "an agreement would never have been achieved". In two months, Laval presented the Assembly a text that overcame its original failure. It met the financial constraints, reduced the control of the government and preserved the choice of doctors and their billing freedom. The Chamber and the Senate passed the law with an overwhelming majority.

When the bill had passed its final stages, Tardieu described his Minister of Labour as "displaying at every moment of the discussion as much tenacity as restraint and ingenuity".

== First Laval government ==
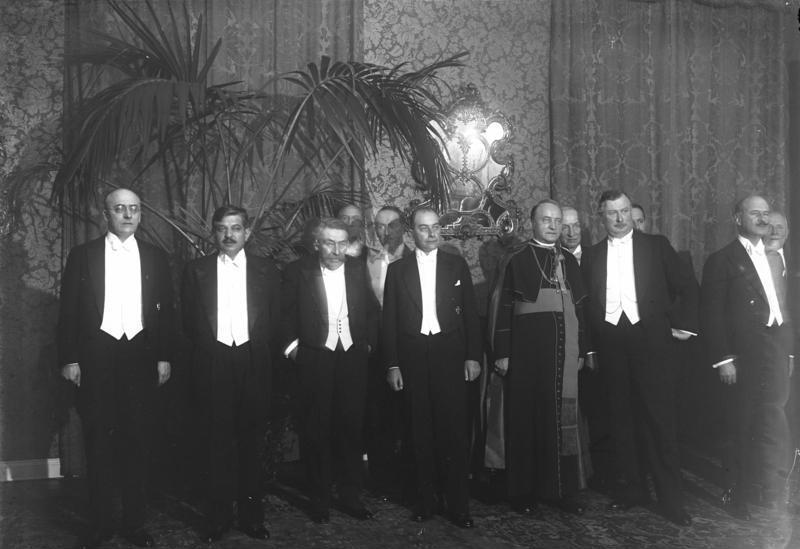
Prime Minister Laval, second from left, at a 1931 diplomatic function in Germany

Tardieu's government ultimately proved unable to weather the Oustric Affair. After the failure of the Oustric Bank, it appeared that members of the government had improper ties to it. The scandal involved Justice Minister Raoul Péret and Under-Secretaries Henri Falcoz and Eugène Lautier. Tardieu had not been involved, but on 4 December 1930, he lost his majority in the Senate. President Gaston Doumergue called on Louis Barthou to form a government, but Barthou failed to do so. Doumergue turned to Laval, who fared no better. The following month, the government that was formed by Théodore Steeg floundered.

Doumergue renewed his offer to Laval. On 27 January 1931, Laval successfully formed his first government.

In the words of its leader, Léon Blum, the Socialist opposition was amazed and disappointed that the ghost of Tardieu's government had reappeared within a few weeks of being defeated with Laval at its head "like a night bird surprised by the light". Laval's nomination as prime minister led to speculation that Tardieu, the new agriculture minister, held the real power in the government.

Although Laval thought highly of Tardieu and Aristide Briand and applied policies in line with theirs, however, Laval was not Tardieu's mouthpiece. Ministers who formed the Laval government were in great part those who had formed Tardieu's governments but that was a function of the composite majority that Laval could find at the National Assembly. Raymond Poincaré, Briand and Tardieu had offered ministerial posts to Herriot's Radicals but to no avail.

Besides Briand, André Maginot, Pierre-Étienne Flandin and Paul Reynaud, Laval brought in as his advisors, friends such as Maurice Foulon from Aubervilliers and Pierre Cathala. Laval had known Cathala in Bayonne, and Cathala had worked in Laval's Labour Ministry. Cathala began as Under-Secretary of the Interior and was appointed as Minister of the Interior in January 1932. Blaise Diagne of Senegal, the first African deputy, had been elected to the National Assembly at the same time as Laval in 1914. Laval invited Diagne to join his cabinet as Under-Secretary to the Colonies. Diagne was the first Black African appointed to a cabinet position in a French government. Laval also called on financial experts such as Jacques Rueff, Charles Rist and Adéodat Boissard. André François-Poncet was appointed as Laval's Under-Secretary and then as ambassador to Germany. Laval's government included an economist, Claude-Joseph Gignoux, when economists in government service were still rare.

France in 1931 was mostly unaffected by the world economic crisis. Laval declared on embarking for the United States on 16 October 1931, "France remained healthy thanks to work and savings". Agriculture, small industry, and protectionism were the bases of France's economy. With a conservative policy of contained wages and limited social services — and with its colonies — France had accumulated the largest gold reserves in the world after the United States. France reaped the benefit of devaluation of the franc that had been orchestrated by Poincaré, which made French products competitive on the world market. In all of France, only 12,000 people were recorded as unemployed.

Laval and his cabinet considered the economy and gold reserves as means to diplomatic ends. Laval left to visit London; Berlin; and Washington, DC. He attended conferences on the world crisis, World War I reparations and debt, disarmament and the gold standard.

=== Role in 1931 Austrian financial crisis ===
In 1931, Austria underwent a banking crisis when its largest bank, the Creditanstalt, was revealed to be nearly bankrupt. That threatened a worldwide financial crisis, and world leaders began negotiating the terms for an international loan to Austria's central government to sustain its financial system. However, Laval blocked the proposed package for nationalist reasons and demanded for France to receive a series of diplomatic concessions in exchange for its support, including renunciation of a prospective German-Austrian customs union. That proved to be fatal for the negotiations, which ultimately fell through. As a result, the Creditanstalt declared bankruptcy on 11 May 1931 and precipitated a crisis that quickly spread to other nations. Within four days, bank runs in Budapest, Hungary, were underway, and bank failures began spreading to Germany, Britain and elsewhere.

=== Hoover Moratorium ===
The Hoover Moratorium on 20 June 1931, a proposal made by US President Herbert Hoover to freeze all intergovernmental debt repayments for a one-year period, was according to the author and political advisor McGeorge Bundy "the most significant action taken by an American president for Europe since Woodrow Wilson's administration." The United States had enormous stakes in Germany since long-term German borrowers owed the US private sector more than $1.25 billion, and the short-term debt neared $1 billion. By comparison, the entire US national income in 1931 was only $54 billion. To put that into perspective, the authors Walter Lippmann and William O. Scroggs stated in The United States in World Affairs, an Account of American Foreign Relations, that "the American stake in Germany's government and private obligations was equal to half that of all the rest of the world combined".

The proposed moratorium would also benefit Britain's investment in Germany's private sector by making more likely that those loans would be repaid while the public indebtedness was frozen. It was in Hoover's interest to offer aid to an ailing British economy in the light of the British debt to the United States. France, on the other hand, had a relatively small stake in Germany's private debt but a huge interest in German reparations, and payments to France would be compromised under the Hoover Moratorium.

The scheme was further complicated by ill timing; the perception of collusion by the Americans, British and Germans; and its breaching of the Young Plan. Such breach could be approved in France only by the National Assembly, and the survival of Laval's government rested on the legislature's approval of the moratorium. Seventeen days elapsed between the proposal and the vote of confidence in the legislature. That delay was blamed for the lack of success of the Hoover Moratorium although the US Congress did not approve it until December 1931.

In support of the Hoover Moratorium, Laval undertook a year of personal and direct diplomacy by which he traveled to London, Berlin and Washington. There were considerable domestic achievements to his name, but his international efforts were short on results. British Prime Minister Ramsay MacDonald and British Foreign Secretary Arthur Henderson were preoccupied by internal political divisions and the collapse of the pound sterling and so were unable to help. German Chancellor Heinrich Brüning and Foreign Minister Julius Curtius were eager for Franco-German reconciliation but were under siege on all sides. They faced a very weak economy, which made meeting the government payroll a weekly miracle. Private bankruptcies and constant layoffs had the Communists on a short fuse. At the other end of the political spectrum, the German Army spied on the Brüning cabinet and fed information to Der Stahlhelm and the Nazis, which effectively froze any overtures towards France.

In the United States, the conference between Hoover and Laval was an exercise in mutual frustration. Hoover's plan for a reduced military had been rebuffed, albeit gently. A solution to the Danzig Corridor problem had been retracted. The concept of introducing a silver standard for countries that left the gold standard was viewed by Laval and François Albert-Buisson as a frivolous proposal. Hoover thought that it might have helped "Mexico, India, China and South America", but Laval dismissed the silver solution as an inflationary proposition and added that "it was cheaper to inflate paper."

Laval as Time Man of the Year for 1931

Laval did not get a security pact without which the French would never consider disarmament, and he did not obtain an endorsement for the political moratorium. The promise to match any reduction of German reparations with a decrease of the French debt was not put in the communiqué. The joint statement declared the attachment of France and the United States to the gold standard.

Both governments also agreed that the Banque de France and the Federal Reserve would consult each other before transfers of gold. That was welcome news after the run on American gold in the preceding weeks. In light of the financial crisis, the leaders agreed to review the economic situation in Germany before the Hoover Moratorium had run its course.

There were meagre political results. The Hoover–Laval encounter, however, had other effects by making Laval more widely known and raising his standing in the United States and France. The American and French press were smitten. His optimism was such a contrast to his grim-sounding international contemporaries that in Time magazine named him as the 1931 Man of the Year, an honour that had never bestowed before on a Frenchman. Laval followed Mohandas K. Gandhi and preceded Franklin D. Roosevelt in receiving the honour.

== Pre-war ==
The second Cartel des Gauches resigned after the 6 February 1934 crisis had involved anti-parliamentarist groups of far-right leagues, veterans organizations and the French Communist Party (PCF). Laval and Marshal Philippe Pétain had contacts with some conservative politicians among the groups involved. Laval became Minister of Colonies in the new conservative government of Gaston Doumergue. In October, Foreign Minister Louis Barthou was assassinated. Laval succeeded him and held that office until 1936.

Laval was then opposed to Germany, the "hereditary enemy" of France, and pursued anti-German alliances. He met with Benito Mussolini in Rome, and both signed the Franco-Italian Agreement on 4 January 1935. It ceded parts of French Somaliland to Italy and allowed it a free hand in Abyssinia in exchange for support against any German aggression. Laval denied that he had given Mussolini a free hand in Abyssinia and even wrote to Il Duce on the subject. Also in January, Laval became the first member of a French Government to visit the Vatican since Napoleon; he was enthusiastically received by Pope Pius XI, and awarded with the Grand Cross of the Order of Pius IX. In April 1935, Laval persuaded Italy and Britain to join France in the Stresa Front against German ambitions in Austria. On 2 May 1935, he signed the Franco-Soviet Treaty of Mutual Assistance, and he met with Josef Stalin, Premier Vyacheslaff Molotoff and Foreign Commissar Maxim Litvinoff in Moscow about 13 May 1935 to seal the alliance.

Laval's primary aim before the Italo-Abyssinian War was to retain Italy as an anti-German power and to avoid driving it into Germany's hands by adopting a hostile attitude to an invasion of Abyssinia. According to the British historian Correlli Barnett, in Laval's view, "all that really mattered was Nazi Germany. His eyes were on the demilitarised zone of the Rhineland; his thoughts on the Locarno guarantees. To estrange Italy, one of the Locarno powers, over such a question as Abyssinia did not appeal to Laval's Auvergnat peasant mind".

In June 1935, Laval became prime minister as well. In October 1935, Laval and British Foreign Minister Samuel Hoare proposed a realpolitik solution to the Abyssinia Crisis. After its leak to the media in December, the Hoare–Laval Pact was widely denounced as appeasement of Mussolini. Laval was forced to resign on 22 January 1936, and was driven completely out of ministerial politics. The victory of the Popular Front in the 1936 French legislative election meant that Laval was out of power, but he had a left-wing government to target in his media.

== Vichy France ==
=== Formation of government ===
During the Phoney War, Laval was cautiously ambivalent towards the conflict. He was on record as saying in March 1940 that although the war could have been avoided by diplomatic means, it was now up to the government to prosecute it with the utmost vigour.

On 9 June 1940, the Germans were advancing on a front more than 250 kilometres (160 mi) long across the entire width of France. As far as General Maxime Weygand was concerned, "if the Germans crossed the Seine and the Marne, it was the end". Simultaneously, Marshal Philippe Pétain was increasing the pressure upon Prime Minister Paul Reynaud to call for an armistice. Meanwhile, Laval was in Châteldon. On 10 June, in view of the German advance, the government left Paris for Tours. Weygand had informed Reynaud that "the final rupture of our lines may take place at any time". Then, "our forces would continue to fight until their strength and resources were extinguished. But their disintegration would be no more than a matter of time". Weygand had avoided using the word "armistice", but it was on the minds of all of those who were involved and was opposed to by Reynaud.

Laval had meanwhile left Châteldon for Bordeaux, where his daughter nearly convinced him of the necessity of going to the United States. Instead, it was reported that he was sending "messengers and messengers" to Pétain.

As the Germans occupied Paris, Pétain was asked to form a new government. To everyone's surprise, he produced a list of his ministers, which was convincing proof that he had been expecting and had been prepared for the President's summons. When he was informed that he was to be appointed Minister of Justice, Laval's temper and ambitions became apparent as he ferociously demanded of Pétain, despite the objections of other men of government, to make him Minister of Foreign Affairs. Laval realised that only through that position could he effect a reversal of alliances and bring himself to favour with Nazi Germany, the military power that he viewed as the inevitable victor. However, Permanent Under-Secretary François Charles-Roux refused to serve under Laval. One consequence of those events was that Laval was later able to claim that he had not been part of the government that requested the armistice. His name did not appear in the chronicles of events until June, when he began to assume a more active role in criticising the government's decision to leave France for French North Africa.

Vichy France

Although the final terms of the armistice were harsh, the French colonial empire was left untouched, the French Navy was maintained, and the French government was nominally allowed to administer the occupied and unoccupied zones if it obeyed German directives. The concept of "collaboration" had been written into the Armistice Convention before Laval joined the government. The French representatives who affixed their signatures to the text accepted the term:

Article III. In the occupied areas of France, the German Reich is to exercise all the rights of an occupying power. The French government promises to facilitate by all possible means the regulations relative to the exercise of this right, and to carry out these regulations with the participation of the French administration. The French government will immediately order all the French authorities and administrative services in the occupied zone to follow the regulations of the German military authorities and to collaborate with the latter in a correct manner.

=== In Vichy government, 1940 ===
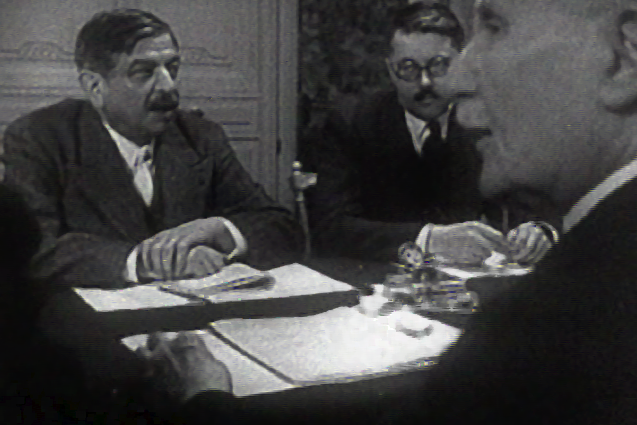
Laval, Yves Bouthillier and Pétain in 1940 (from Frank Capra's documentary film Divide and Conquer, 1943)

By then, there was very little left of Laval the socialist. He now openly sympathized with National Socialism and was convinced that Germany would win the war. For that reason, Laval felt France needed to emulate the Third Reich and its totalitarian regime as much as possible. To that end, when he was included in the Cabinet as minister of state, Laval set about with the work for which he is remembered: dismantling the Third Republic and its democracy and taking up the fascist cause.

In October 1940, Laval understood collaboration more or less in the same sense as Pétain. For both, that meant giving up the least possible to get the most in return. Laval, in his role of go-between, was forced to be in constant touch with the German authorities, to shift ground, to be wily and to plan ahead. All of that under the circumstances drew more attention to him than to the Marshal and made him appear to many Frenchmen as "the agent of collaboration", and to others, he was "the Germans' man".

The meetings between Pétain and Adolf Hitler and between Laval and Hitler are often used as evidence of Vichy collaboration with the Nazis. In fact, Montoire (24–26 October 1940) was a disappointment to both sides. Hitler wanted France to declare war on Britain, and the French wanted improved relations with their conqueror. Neither happened, and virtually the only concession that the French obtained was the 'Berlin Protocol' of 16 November 1940, which provided for the release of certain categories of French prisoners-of-war.

In November 1940, Laval took a number of pro-German decisions of his own, without consulting with colleagues. The most notorious examples concerned turning the RTB Bor copper mines and the Belgian gold reserves over to German control. After the war, Laval's justification, apart from a denial that he acted unilaterally, was that Vichy was powerless to prevent the Germans from gaining something that they were clearly so eager to obtain.

=== Dismissal, 1940–1942 ===
Laval's actions were a factor in his dismissal on 13 December 1940. Pétain asked all of the ministers to sign a collective letter of resignation during a full cabinet meeting. Laval did so since he thought that it was a device to get rid of Labour Minister M. Belin. Laval was therefore stunned when Pétain announced, "the resignations of MM. Laval and Ripert are accepted". That evening, Laval was arrested and driven by the police to his home in Châteldon. The following day, Pétain announced his decision to remove Laval from the government and replace him with Pierre-Étienne Flandin. The reason was a fundamental incompatibility with Pétain. Laval's methods of working appeared slovenly to Pétain's precise military mind, and Laval showed a marked lack of deference, as instanced by a habit of blowing cigarette smoke in Pétain's face. By doing so, he aroused Pétain's irritation and the anger of the entire cabinet.

Laval was detained under house arrest for some time, but was released after the intervention of German ambassador Otto Abetz, who had him brought to Paris, where he lived under German protection, while continuing to take part in the public and political life.

On 27 August 1941, several top Vichyites, including Laval, attended a review of the Légion des Volontaires Français (LVF), a collaborationist militia. Paul Collette, a member of the Croix-de-Feu, shot Laval (and also Marcel Déat, another prominent collaborationist), during a troop review and slightly wounded him, but Laval soon recovered from the injury.

=== Return to power, 1942–1944 ===
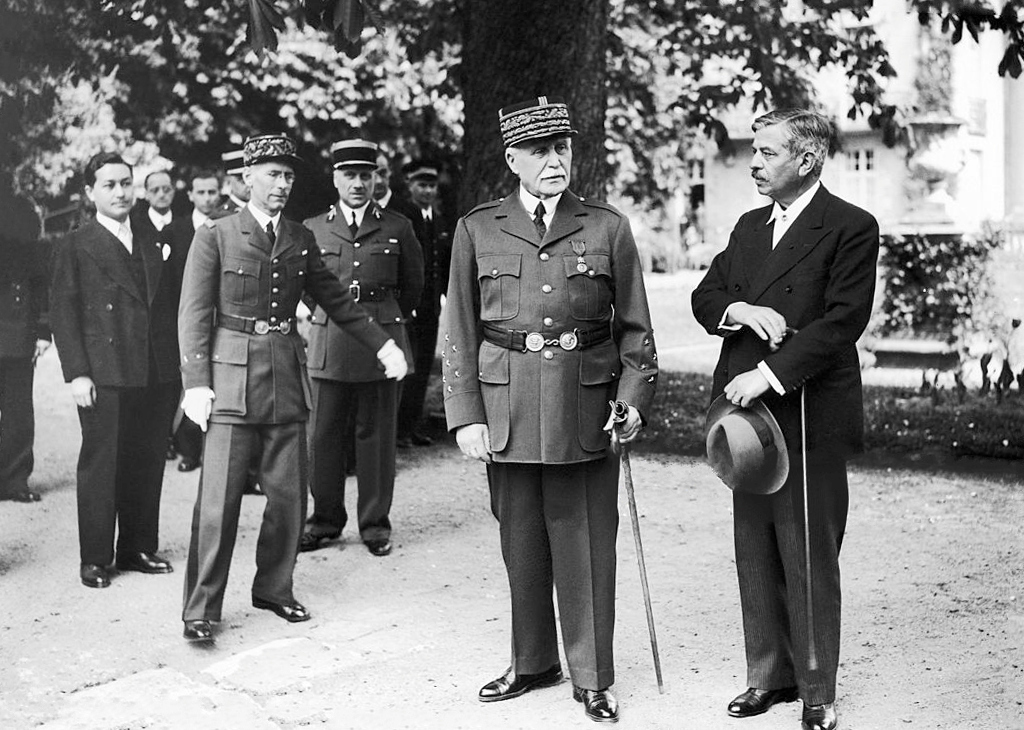
Laval and Pétain in 1942

Laval returned to power in April 1942. In an infamous radio speech on 22 June 1942, Laval outlined his policy objectives by expressing his "desire to re-establish normal and trusting relations with Germany and Italy". He added he "wished for a German victory" because otherwise "Bolshevism [would] establish itself everywhere". The effect of such speech on public opinion was disastrous, since it made clear to everyone that the Vichy government was de facto subservient to the Germans; Pétain and the other ministers were also bewildered and highly irritated by Laval's nerve.

Laval had been in power for a mere two months when he was faced with the decision of providing forced labour to Germany, which was short of skilled labour because it needed troop replacements on the Eastern Front. Unlike other occupied countries, France was technically protected by the armistice, and its workers could not be simply rounded up for transportation. In the occupied zone, the Germans used intimidation and the control of raw materials to create unemployment and thus create reasons for French labourers to volunteer to work in Germany. Laval received German demands to send more than 300,000 skilled labourers immediately to factories in Germany. Laval delayed by making a counteroffer of one worker in return for one French prisoner-of-war. The proposal was sent to Hitler, and a compromise was reached that one prisoner-of-war would be repatriated for every three workers arriving in Germany.

Laval's precise role in the deportation of Jews has been hotly debated by both his accusers and his defenders. The Germans never told the Vichy French authorities about the extermination camps; instead, the French were told that Jews were being deported as forced labour for the Axis war effort. When ordered to have all Jews in France rounded up to be transported to German-occupied Poland, Laval negotiated a compromise by allowing only Jews who were not French citizens to be forfeited to German control. It was estimated that by the end of the war, the Germans had killed 90% of the Jewish population in other occupied countries, but in France, 50% of the prewar French and foreign Jewish population, with perhaps 90% of the purely-French Jewish population still remaining alive. Laval went beyond the orders given to him by the Germans, as he included Jewish children under 16, whom the Germans had given him permission to spare, in the deportations. In his book Churches and the Holocaust, Mordecai Paldiel claims that when the Protestant leader Marc Boegner visited Laval to remonstrate, Laval claimed that he had ordered children to be deported along with their parents because families should not be separated, and "children should remain with their parents". According to Paldiel, when Boegner argued that the children would almost certainly die, Laval replied that "not one [Jewish child] must remain in France". It was believed that Laval also attempted to prevent Jewish children gaining visas to the United States that had been arranged by the American Friends Service Committee and that Laval was committed less to expelling Jewish children from France than to making sure they reached Nazi camps.

Laval outright spurned the efforts of Pope Pius to stop the deportation of Jews from France.

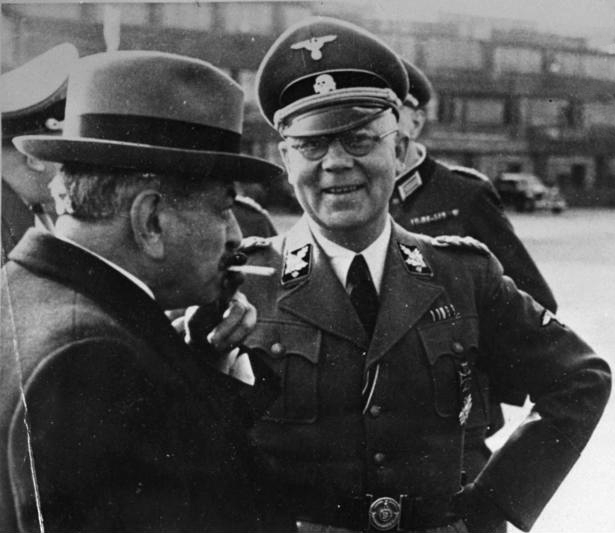
Laval with the head of German police units in France, Carl Oberg

More and more, the insoluble dilemma of collaboration faced Laval and his chief of staff, Jean Jardin; Laval had to maintain Vichy's authority to prevent Germany from installing a puppet government, which would be made up of French Nazis such as Jacques Doriot.

When the Allied landings in French North Africa (Operation Torch) began in November 1942, Germany and Italy occupied the Zone libre, thus ending any factual sovereignty of the Vichy government over Metropolitan France. Hitler continued to ask whether the French government was prepared to fight at his side and required Vichy to declare war against Britain: Laval and Pétain agreed to maintain a firm refusal, struggling against ultracollaborationist ministers.

In 1943, Laval became the nominal leader of the newly created Milice, but its operational leader was Secretary General Joseph Darnand. In a speech broadcast during the Normandy landings in June 1944, Laval appealed to the nation:

You are not in the war. You must not take part in the fighting. If you do not observe this rule, if you show proof of indiscipline, you will provoke reprisals the harshness of which the government would be powerless to moderate. You would suffer, both physically and materially, and you would add to your country's misfortunes. You will refuse to heed the insidious appeals, which will be addressed to you. Those who ask you to stop work or invite you to revolt are the enemies of our country. You will refuse to aggravate the foreign war on our soil with the horror of civil war.... At this moment fraught with drama, when the war has been carried on to our territory, show by your worthy and disciplined attitude that you are thinking of France and only of her".

In August 1944, as Allied forces were approaching Paris, Laval attempted a last-ditch plot to prevent de Gaulle or the Communist Party from taking power: with permission from the Germans, he attempted to call back the National Assembly (which had not been meeting since 1940) with the goal of giving it the power to form a government that could be seen as legitimate. With the endorsement of German ambassador Otto Abetz, Laval had Édouard Herriot, President of the Chamber of Deputies, released from imprisonment and brought back to Paris, so that he could re-convene the Parliament; the President of the Senate Jules Jeanneney was also sought, but could not be found. Laval's machinations failed: after being initially collaborative, Herriot refused to go on with the plan due to the absence of Jeanneney, while the Germans changed their minds after the intervention of the ultracollaborationists Marcel Déat and Fernand de Brinon. On 17 August Herriot was arrested by the Germans and deported to Laxou and then to Potsdam, thus ending any possibility of recalling the Assembly.

=== Exile in Sigmaringen and Spain, 1944–1945 ===
On the same day, Laval and some others were also arrested by the Germans and transported to Belfort, where they arrived on 19 August. In view of the speed of the Allied advance, what was left of the Vichy government was moved on 7 September 1944 from Belfort to the Sigmaringen enclave in Germany. Pétain took residence at the Hohenzollern castle in Sigmaringen. At first, Laval also resided in that castle. In January 1945 Laval was assigned to the Stauffenberg castle in Wilflingen, 12 km outside the Sigmaringen enclave. By April 1945, US General George S. Patton's army approached Sigmaringen and so the Vichy ministers were forced to seek their own refuge. Laval received permission to enter Francisco Franco's Spain and was flown to Barcelona by a Luftwaffe plane. However, 90 days later, Charles de Gaulle pressured Spain to expel Laval. The same Luftwaffe plane that had flown him to Spain then flew him to the American-occupied zone of Austria. He had attempted to seek refuge in Liechtenstein, but was turned away. The American authorities immediately arrested Laval and his wife and turned them over to the Free French. They were flown to Paris to be imprisoned at Fresnes Prison. Madame Laval was later released, but Pierre Laval remained in prison to be tried for treason.

Prior to his arrest, Laval had planned to move to Sintra, Portugal, where a house had been leased for him.

== Trial and execution ==
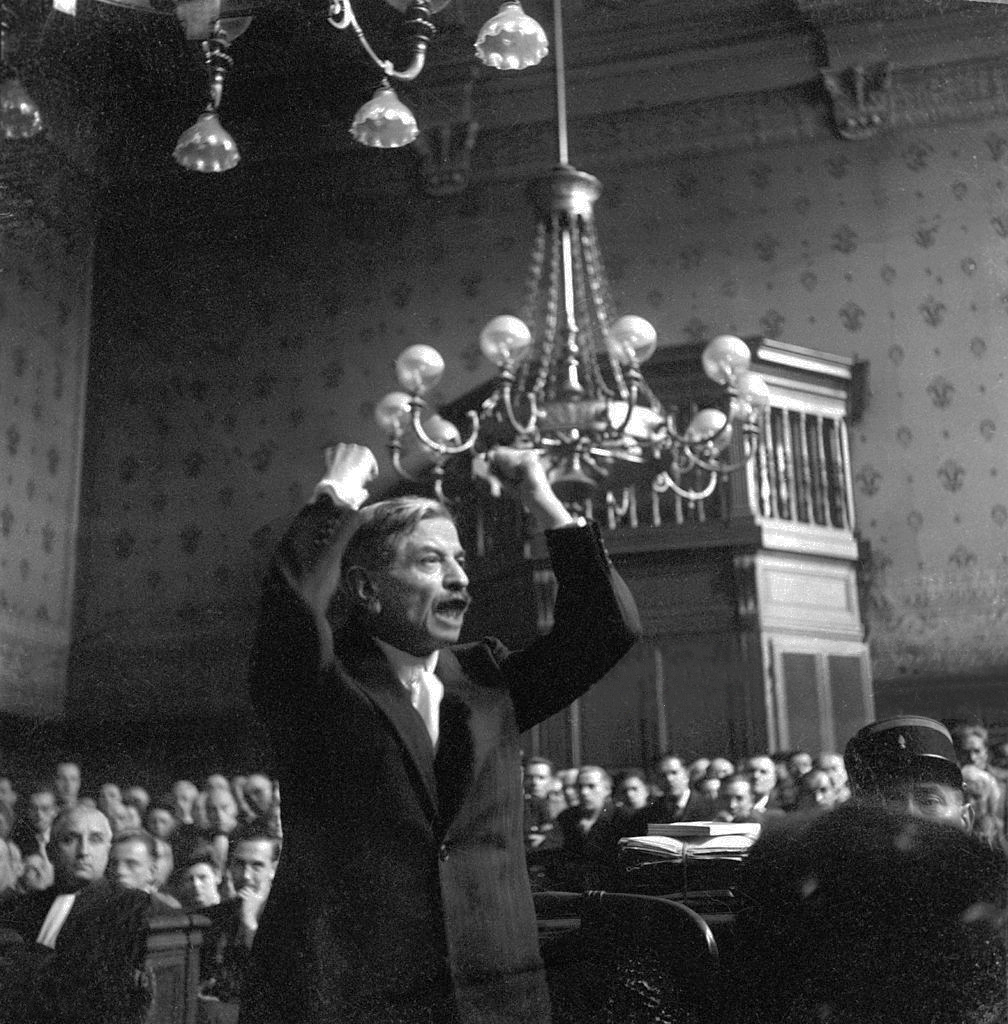
Pierre Laval during his trial

Two trials were to be held. Although it was said to have had its faults, the Pétain trial permitted the presentation and examination of a vast amount of pertinent material. Numerous scholars, including Robert Paxton and Geoffrey Warner, believe that Laval's trial demonstrated the inadequacies of the judicial system and the poisonous political atmosphere of that purge-trial era. During his imprisonment pending the verdict of his treason trial, Laval wrote his only book, the posthumously published Diary (1948). His daughter, Josée de Chambrun, smuggled it out of the prison page by page.

Laval firmly believed that he would be able to convince his fellow countrymen that he had been acting in their best interests all along. "Father-in-law wants a big trial which will illuminate everything", René de Chambrun told Laval's lawyers: "If he is given time to prepare his defence, if he is allowed to speak, to call witnesses and to obtain from abroad the information and documents which he needs, he will confound his accusers". "Do you want me to tell you the setup?" Laval asked one of his lawyers on 4 August. "There will be no pre-trial hearings and no trial. I will be condemned – and got rid of – before the elections".

Laval's trial began at 1:30 pm on 4 October 1945. He was charged with plotting against the security of the State and intelligence (collaboration) with the enemy. He had three defence lawyers (Jaques Baraduc, Albert Naud and Yves-Frédéric Jaffré). None of his lawyers had met him before. He dealt mostly with Jaffré, who sat with him, talked, listened and took down notes that he wanted to dictate. Baraduc, who quickly became convinced of Laval's innocence, kept contact with the Chambruns and at first shared their conviction that Laval would be acquitted or at most would receive a sentence of temporary exile. Naud, who had been a member of the Resistance, believed Laval to be guilty and urged him to plead that he had made grave errors but had acted under constraint. Laval would not listen to him and was convinced that he was innocent and could prove it. "He acted", said Naud, "as if his career, not his life, was at stake".

All three of his lawyers declined to be in court to hear the reading of the formal charges: "We fear that the haste which has been employed to open the hearings is inspired, not by judicial preoccupations, but motivated by political considerations". In lieu of attending the hearing, they sent letters stating the shortcomings and asked to be discharged as counsel. The court carried on without them. The president of the court, Pierre Mongibeaux, announced that the trial had to be completed before the general election scheduled for 21 October. Mongibeaux and Mornet, the public prosecutors, were unable to control the constant and relentless hostile, vulgar outbursts and heckles from the jury. They occurred as heated exchanges between Mongibeaux and Laval became louder and louder. On the third day, Laval's three lawyers were with him as the President of the Bar Association had advised them to resume their duties.

After the adjournment, Mongibeaux announced that the part of the interrogation dealing with the charge of plotting against the security of the state was concluded. To the charge of collaboration, Laval replied, "Monsieur le Président, the insulting way in which you questioned me earlier and the demonstrations in which some members of the jury indulged show me that I may be the victim of a judicial crime. I do not want to be an accomplice; I prefer to remain silent". Mongibeaux called the first of the prosecution witnesses, but they had not expected to testify so soon, and none were present. Mongibeaux adjourned the hearing for the second time so that the witnesses could be located. When the court reassembled half an hour later, Laval was no longer in his place.

Although Pierre-Henri Teitgen, the Minister of Justice in Charles de Gaulle's cabinet, personally appealed to Laval's lawyers to have him attend the hearings, they declined to do so. Teitgen freely confirmed the conduct of Mongibeaux and Mornet and professed that he was unable to do anything to curb them. A sentence of death was handed down in Laval's absence. His lawyers were refused a retrial.

The execution was fixed for the morning of 15 October at Fresnes Prison. Laval attempted to commit suicide before the sentence by taking poison from a vial stitched inside the lining of his jacket. He did not intend, he explained in a suicide note, that French soldiers should become accomplices in a "judicial crime". The poison, however, was so old that it was ineffective and so repeated stomach-pumpings revived Laval. Laval requested for his lawyers to witness his execution. He was shot and shouted, "Vive la France!" Laval's wife declared to an English newspaper, "It is not the French way to try a man without letting him speak. That's the way he always fought against – the German way."

His corpse was initially buried in an unmarked grave in the Thiais cemetery until it was buried in the Chambrun family mausoleum at the Montparnasse Cemetery in November 1945.

His daughter, Josée Laval, wrote a letter to Winston Churchill in 1948 and suggested that the firing squad who killed her father "wore British uniforms". The letter was published in the June 1949 issue of Human Events, an American conservative newspaper.

The High Court, which functioned until 1949, judged 108 cases and pronounced eight death penalties, including one for an elderly Pétain, whose appeal failed. Only three of the death penalties were carried out: those of Laval; Fernand de Brinon, Vichy's Ambassador in Paris to the German authorities; and Joseph Darnand, the head of the Milice.

== Legacy and assessment ==
Laval's manifold political activities left a complicated and controversial legacy, which have resulted in more than a dozen conflicting biographies of him.

In his memoirs, Otto Abetz, German Ambassador to France from 1940 to 1944, subsequently described Laval in high terms:

He was one of the greatest statesmen of our time, and, in any case, its last truly great liberal politician.

A more balanced approach was laid down by Charles de Gaulle in his own memoir:

Naturally inclined, accustomed by the regime, to approach matters from below, Laval held that, whatever happens, it is important to be in power, that a certain degree of astuteness always controls the situation, that there is no event that cannot be turned around, no men that cannot be handled. He had, in the cataclysm, felt the misfortune of the country but also the opportunity to take the reins and apply on a vast scale the capacity he had to deal with anything. But the victorious Reich was a partner who did not intend to compromise. For, despite everything [...] he had to embrace the disaster of France. He accepted the condition. He judged that it was possible to take advantage of the worst, to use even the point of servitude, to even associate oneself with the invader, to make oneself an asset of the most terrible repression. To carry out his policy, he renounced the honor of the country, the independence of the State, and national pride. Now, these elements reappeared alive and demanding as the enemy weakened. Laval had played. He had lost. He had the courage to admit that he was responsible for the consequences. No doubt, in his government, deploying all the resources of ruse, all the resources of obstinacy to support the unsustainable, he sought to serve his country. Let that be left to him!

According to historian Michèle Cointet, Laval, cynically believing in a German victory, saw himself as a realist saving the French people from "their misfortunes and patriotic daydreams".

== Governments ==
=== Laval's First Ministry, 27 January 1931 – 14 January 1932 ===
- Pierre Laval – President of the Council and Minister of the Interior
- Léon Bérard – Vice-President of the Council and Minister of Justice
- Aristide Briand – Minister of Foreign Affairs
- André Maginot – Minister of War
- Charles Dumont – Minister of Marine
- Jacques-Louis Dumesnil – Minister of Air
- Mario Roustan – Minister of Public Instruction and Fine Arts
- Pierre Étienne Flandin – Minister of Finance
- François Piétri – Minister of Budget
- Maurice Deligne – Minister of Public Works
- Louis Rollin – Minister of Commerce and Industry
- André Tardieu – Minister of Agriculture
- Louis de Chappedelaine – Minister of Merchant Marine
- Auguste Champetier de Ribes – Minister of Pensions
- Adolphe Landry – Minister of Labour and Social Security Provisions
- Camille Blaisot – Minister of Public Health
- Charles Guernier – Minister of Posts, Telegraphs, and Telephones
- Paul Reynaud – Minister of Colonies

==== Changes ====
A few changes after Aristide Briand's retirement and the death of André Maginot on 7 January 1932:

- War: André Tardieu
- Interieur: Pierre Cathala
- Agriculture: Achille Fould
- André François-Poncet upon becoming ambassador to Germany was replaced by C.J. Gignoux.

=== Laval's Second Ministry, 14 January – 20 February 1932 ===
- Pierre Laval – President of the Council and Minister of Foreign Affairs
- André Tardieu – Minister of War
- Pierre Cathala – Minister of the Interior
- Pierre-Étienne Flandin – Minister of Finance
- François Piétri – Minister of Budget
- Adolphe Landry – Minister of Labour and Social Security Provisions
- Léon Bérard – Minister of Justice
- Charles Dumont – Minister of Marine
- Louis de Chappedelaine – Minister of Merchant Marine
- Jacques-Louis Dumesnil – Minister of Air
- Mario Roustan – Minister of Public Instruction and Fine Arts
- Auguste Champetier de Ribes – Minister of Pensions
- Achille Fould – Minister of Agriculture
- Paul Reynaud – Minister of Colonies
- Maurice Deligne – Minister of Public Works
- Camille Blaisot – Minister of Public Health
- Charles Guernier – Minister of Posts, Telegraphs, and Telephones
- Louis Rollin – Minister of Commerce and Industry

=== Laval's Third Ministry, 7 June 1935 – 24 January 1936 ===
- Pierre Laval – President of the Council and Minister of Foreign Affairs
- Jean Fabry – Minister of War
- Joseph Paganon – Minister of the Interior
- Marcel Régnier – Minister of Finance
- Ludovic-Oscar Frossard – Minister of Labour
- Léon Bérard – Minister of Justice
- François Piétri – Minister of Marine
- Mario Roustan – Minister of Merchant Marine
- Victor Denain – Minister of Air
- Philippe Marcombes – Minister of National Education
- Henri Maupoil – Minister of Pensions
- Pierre Cathala – Minister of Agriculture
- Louis Rollin – Minister of Colonies
- Laurent Eynac – Minister of Public Works
- Ernest Lafont – Minister of Public Health and Physical Education
- Georges Mandel – Minister of Posts, Telegraphs, and Telephones
- Georges Bonnet – Minister of Commerce and Industry
- Édouard Herriot – Minister of State
- Louis Marin – Minister of State
- Pierre Étienne Flandin – Minister of State

==== Changes ====
- 17 June 1935 – Mario Roustan succeeds Marcombes (d. 13 June) as Minister of National Education. William Bertrand succeeds Roustan as Minister of Merchant Marine.

=== Laval's Ministry in the Vichy Government, 18 April 1942 – 19 August 1944 ===
- Pierre Laval – President of the Council, Minister of Foreign Affairs, Minister of the Interior, and Minister of Information
- Eugène Bridoux – Minister of War
- Pierre Cathala – Minister of Finance and National Economy
- Jean Bichelonne – Minister of Industrial Production
- Hubert Lagardelle – Minister of Labour
- Joseph Barthélemy – Minister of Justice
- Gabriel Auphan – Minister of Marine
- Jean-François Jannekeyn – Minister of Air
- Abel Bonnard – Minister of National Education
- Jacques Le Roy Ladurie – Minister of Agriculture
- Max Bonnafous – Minister of Supply
- Jules Brévié – Minister of Colonies
- Raymond Grasset – Minister of Family and Health
- Robert Gibrat – Minister of Communication
- Lucien Romier – Minister of State

==== Changes ====
- 11 September 1942 – Max Bonnafous succeeds Le Roy Ladurie as Minister of Agriculture, remaining also Minister of Supply
- 18 November 1942 – Jean-Charles Abrial succeeds Auphan as Minister of Marine. Jean Bichelonne succeeds Gibrat as Minister of Communication, remaining also Minister of Industrial Production.
- 26 March 1943 – Maurice Gabolde succeeds Barthélemy as Minister of Justice. Henri Bléhaut succeeds Abrial as Minister of Marine and Brévié as Minister of Colonies.
- 21 November 1943 – Jean Bichelonne succeeds Lagardelle as Minister of Labour, remaining also Minister of Industrial Production and Communication.
- 31 December 1943 – Minister of State Lucien Romier resigns from the government.
- 6 January 1944 – Pierre Cathala succeeds Bonnafous as Minister of Agriculture and Supply, remaining also Minister of Finance and National Economy.
- 3 March 1944 – The office of Minister of Supply is abolished. Pierre Cathala remains Minister of Finance, National Economy, and Agriculture.
- 16 March 1944 – Marcel Déat succeeds Bichelonne as Minister of Labour and National Solidarity. Bichelonne remains Minister of Industrial Production and Communication.

Political offices
Preceded by Victor Peytral	Minister of Transportation; 1925	Succeeded by Anatole de Monzie
Preceded by René Renoult	Minister of Justice; 1926	Succeeded by Maurice Colrat
Preceded by Louis Loucheur	Minister of Labour and Social Security Provisions; 1930	Succeeded by Édouard Grinda
Preceded by Théodore Steeg	President of the Council; 1931–32	Succeeded by André Tardieu
Preceded by Georges Leygues	Minister of the Interior; 1931–32	Succeeded by Pierre Cathala
Preceded by Aristide Briand	Minister of Foreign Affairs; 1932	Succeeded by André Tardieu
Preceded by Adolphe Landry	Minister of Labour and Social Security Provisions; 1932	Succeeded by Albert Dalimier
Preceded by Henry de Jouvenel	Minister of Colonies; 1934	Succeeded by Louis Rollin
Preceded by Louis Barthou	Minister of Foreign Affairs; 1934–36	Succeeded by Pierre Étienne Flandin
Preceded by Fernand Bouisson	President of the Council; 1935–36	Succeeded by Albert Sarraut
Preceded by Philippe Pétain	Vice-President of the Council; 1940	Succeeded by Pierre Étienne Flandin
Preceded by Paul Baudoin	Minister of Foreign Affairs; 1940	Succeeded by Pierre Étienne Flandin
Preceded by Philippe Pétain	President of the Council; 1942–44	Succeeded by Charles de Gaulle
Preceded by François Darlan	Minister of Foreign Affairs; 1942–44	Succeeded by Georges Bidault
Preceded by Pierre Pucheu	Minister of the Interior; 1942–44	Succeeded by Adrien Tixier
Preceded by Paul Marion	Minister of Information; 1942–44	Succeeded by Pierre-Henri Teitgen
