= Minister of Merchant Marine (France) =

The Minister of Merchant Marine (Ministre de la Marine marchande) was responsible for the department that administered the French Merchant Navy.

== Inter-war period ==
Ministers in the period between the two world wars were:

- 3 November 1929 – 21 February 1930 : Louis Rollin
- 21 February 1930 – 2 March 1930 : Charles Daniélou
- 2 March 1930 – 13 December 1930 : Louis Rollin
- 13 December 1930 – 27 January 1931 : Charles Daniélou
- 27 January 1931 – 20 February 1932 : Louis de Chappedelaine
- 20 February 1932 – 3 June 1932 : Charles Guernier
- 3 June 1932 – 31 January 1933 : Léon Meyer
- 31 January 1933 – 26 October 1933 : Eugène Frot
- 26 October 1933 – 26 November 1933 : Jacques Stern
- 26 November 1933 – 9 January 1934 : Eugène Frot
- 9 January 1934 – 30 January 1934 : William Bertrand
- 30 January 1934 – 9 February 1934 : Guy La Chambre
- 9 February 1934 – 1 June 1935 : William Bertrand
- 1 June 1935 – 7 June 1935 : François Piétri
- 7 June 1935 – 17 June 1935 : Marius Roustan
- 17 June 1935 – 24 January 1936 : William Bertrand
- 24 January 1936 – 4 June 1936 : Louis de Chappedelaine
- 18 January 1938 – 13 March 1938 : Paul Elbel
- 10 April 1938 – 13 September 1939 : Louis de Chappedelaine

== World War II ==
The minister, and then commissaires during World War II were:

- 13 September 1939 – 16 June 1940 : Alphonse Rio
- 24 September 1941 – 4 March 1942 : Émile Muselier (Commissaire)
- 4 March 1942 – 7 June 1943 : Philippe Auboyneau (Commissaire)
- 7 June 1943 – 9 November 1943 : René Mayer (Commissaire)

== Post-war ministers ==
Ministers after World War II were:

- 11 September 1948 – 28 October 1949 : André Colin
- 2 July 1950 – 12 July 1950 : Lionel de Tinguy du Pouët
- 12 July 1950 – 11 August 1951 : Gaston Defferre
- 11 August 1951 – 8 March 1952 : André Morice
- 20 January 1955 – 23 February 1955 : Raymond Schmittlein
- 23 February 1955 – 1 February 1956 : Paul Antier
- 11 November 1957 – 15 April 1958 : Maurice-René Simonnet (Secretary of State)

== Sources ==
- Zanco, Jean-Philippe (2011). Dictionnaire des Ministres de la Marine 1689–1958 (in French). Paris: S.P.M. Kronos. ISBN 978-2-901952-83-1.
