= Daniélou =

Daniélou is a surname. Notable people with the surname include:

- Alain Daniélou (1907–1994), French historian, intellectual, musicologist and Indologist
- Charles Daniélou (1878–1953), French politician who was Minister of the Merchant Marine in 1930–1931
- Jean Daniélou (1905–1974), theologian, historian, cardinal and a member of the Académie française
- Yann Daniélou (born 1966) is a retired French football defender
