= Guy La Chambre =

French politician (1898–1975)

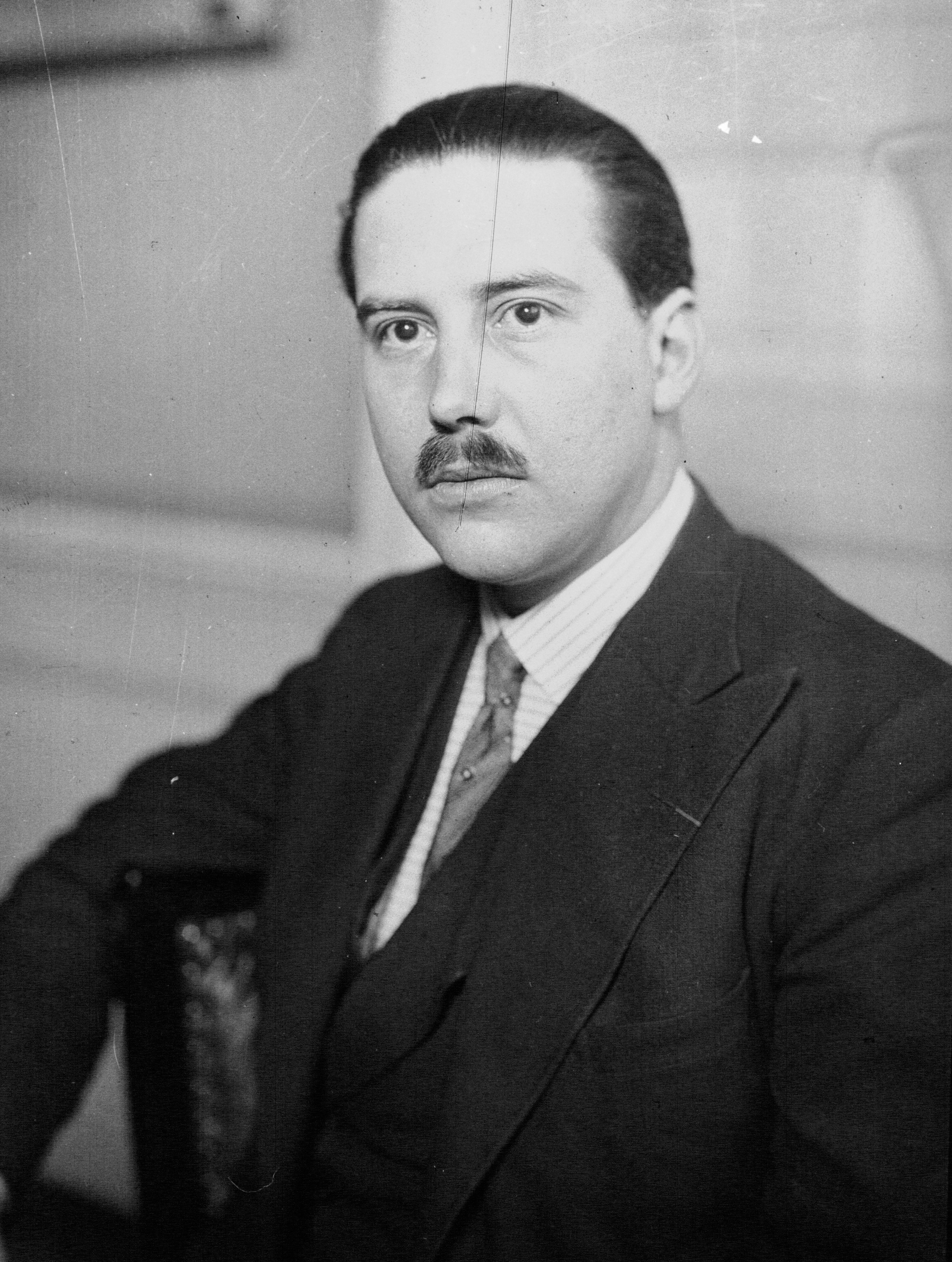
- La Chambre in 1933

Minister of Air
- In office 18 January 1938 – 21 March 1940
- Prime Minister: Léon Blum; Édouard Daladier
- Preceded by: Pierre Cot
- Succeeded by: Laurent Eynac

Minister of Merchant Marine
- In office 30 January 1934 – 9 February 1934
- Prime Minister: Édouard Daladier
- Preceded by: William Bertrand
- Succeeded by: William Bertrand

Personal details
- Born: 5 June 1898 Paris, France
- Died: 24 May 1975 (aged 76) Neuilly-sur-Seine, Hauts-de-Seine, France
- Party: Radical Party
- Education: University of Paris

Guy La Chambre (5 June 1898 – 24 May 1975) was a French politician. He served as Minister of Merchant Marine in 1934 and Minister of Air from 1938 until 1940.

== Life ==
Guy La Chambre was born on 5 June 1898, into a prosperous family with roots in Brittany. His father, Charles La Chambre served in the Chamber of Deputies representing Ille-et-Vilaine from 1902 to 1906, and Guy's grandfather Charles-Emile also served in that capacity from 1876 to 1881 and from 1889 to 1893.

He was educated at the Lycée Condorcet and the Lycée Louis-le-Grand and studied law at the University of Paris. In 1916 he enlisted as a volunteer in the French Army and served for the remainder of the First World War, being awarded the Croix de guerre 1914–1918 for his services. In the aftermath of the German defeat La Chambre served with the Allied occupation forces in the Rhineland. After completing his legal studies and being admitted to the bar, La Chambre was employed working in the private office of Prime Minister Aristide Briand.

At the 1928 general election, he stood successfully in Saint-Malo and held his seat in the 1932 and 1936 elections. He was Minister of Merchant Marine from January 30, 1934 – February 9, 1934.

He was appointed Minister of Air on 18 January 1938, and held the office until 21 March 1940.

On 10 July 1940, he voted in favour of granting the cabinet presided by Marshal Philippe Pétain authority to draw up a new constitution, thereby effectively ending the French Third Republic and establishing Vichy France. In spite of his pro-Pétain vote, he appeared at the Riom Trial in 1942 as one of those accused of being responsible for the defeat.

He died on 24 May 1975.

== Sources and further reading ==
- Biography
- de Ladoucette, Michel (1979), Guy La Chambre: un Malouin illustre, homme de cœur et de devoir, Dieppe: La Vigie
