= Charles Guernier =

French politician (1870–1943)

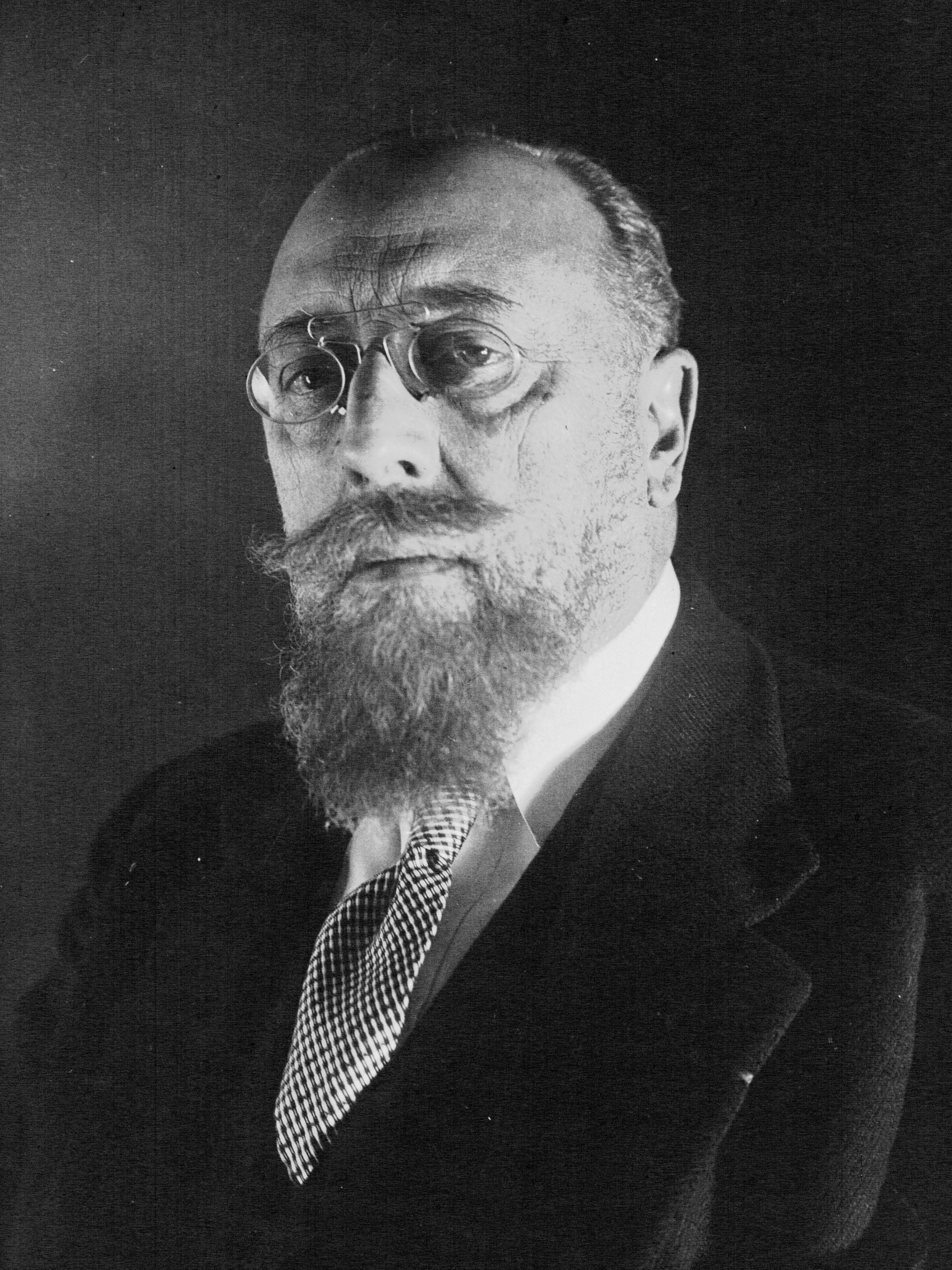
- Guernier in 1933

Minister of Posts, Telegraphs, and Telephones
- In office 27 January 1931 – 20 February 1932
- Prime Minister: Pierre Laval
- Preceded by: Georges Bonnet
- Succeeded by: Louis Rollin

Minister of Public Works and the Merchant Marine
- In office 20 February 1932 – 3 June 1932
- Preceded by: Georges Pernot (Public Works); Louis de Chappedelaine (Merchant Marine)
- Succeeded by: Joseph Paganon (Public Works); Léon Meyer (Merchant Marine)

Personal details
- Born: 26 April 1870 Saint-Malo, Ille-et-Vilaine, France
- Died: 19 February 1943 (aged 72) Paris, France

Charles Guernier (26 April 1870 – 19 February 1943) was a French politician. He was deputy for Ille-et-Vilaine from 1906 to 1924 and from 1928 to 1942. He was Minister of Posts, Telegraphs, and Telephones from 1931 to 1932, and Minister of Public Works and the Merchant Marine in 1932.

== Early years ==
Charles Guernier was born on 26 April 1870 in Saint-Malo, Ille-et-Vilaine. Guernier grew up in Saint-Malo, then was admitted to the University of Rennes. He studied law, and obtained his doctorate in 1897 with a thesis on Scottish crofters. He lectured at the Faculty of Law in the University of Paris, then taught a course on Political Economy and History of Economic Doctrines in the Faculty of Law of the University of Lyon. He was a professor at the University of Lille from 1898 to 1905.

== Political career ==
Guernier was elected deputy for the first district of Saint-Malo, Ille-et-Vilaine, on 6 May 1906 . He sat with the Gauche démocratique (Democratic Left). He was reelected on 20 April 1910, and sat with the same group. He became a general councilor for Ille-et-Vilaine representing the canton of Cancale in 1910, and held this seat for thirty years. On 26 April 1914 he was again elected deputy and sat with the Gauche radicale (Radical Left).

Throughout his parliamentary career Guernier was involved in foreign policy and the merchant navy. He was under-secretary of state for the Merchant Navy from 10 to 13 June 1914. He was high commissioner to the British government for regulation of allied maritime affairs from April to September 1917. At the end of this assignment he was appointed Companion of the Order of the Bath.

On 16 November 1919 Guernier was reelected deputy and sat with the Gauche républicaine démocratique (Democratic Republican Left). He was elected chairman of the Ille-et-Vilaine council in 1921 in place of René Brice, who had died, and held the presidency until 1924. He was defeated in the parliamentary election of 1924. On 29 April 1928 Guernier was elected deputy for Ille-et-Vilaine and sat with the Gauche radicale (Radical Left). He represented the first district of Saint-Malo.

Guernier was Minister of Posts, Telegraphs and Telephones from 27 January 1931 to 20 February 1932. In this post Guernier said public broadcasting had to "establish across the nation a continuous spiritual connection so that alongside the grand national works that advantage Paris and our other large cities, the innumerable equally powerful and precious works generated throughout many parts of our provinces can also be diffused over the entire country. He was Minister of Public Works and the Merchant Marine in from 20 February 1932 to 3 June 1932. On 1 May 1932 he was reelected deputy, and sat with the Gauche radicale list. He was reelected on 26 April 1936.

On 10 July 1940 Guernier was among the deputies of the Democratic and Radical Independent Left who voted for the constitutional change requested by Marshal Philippe Pétain that established the Vichy government. He died on 19 February 1943 in Paris, aged 72.

== Publications ==
- Guernier, Charles (1897). Les Crofters écossais – Thèse... Université de Rennes, Faculté de droit (in French). Paris: A. Rousseau. p. 164.
- Guernier, Charles (1913). La saisie-arrêt des salaires et traitements : compte rendu des discussions. Association pour la protection légale des travailleurs, section française (in French). Paris: F. Alcan. p. 59.
- Guernier, Charles (1919). preface. Traité de droit maritime commercial et de police de la navigation, à l'usage des capitaines de la marine marchande et des élèves des écoles d'hydrographie. By Martin, J. (in French) (4 ed.). Paris: Challamel. p. 387.

== Sources ==
- Bougeard, Christian (1999). La Bretagne d'une guerre à l'autre: 1914-1945 (in French). Editions Jean-paul Gisserot. ISBN 978-2-87747-431-3.
- "Charles GUERNIER – Mandats". Sycomore (in French). Assemblée nationale.
- collectif (2001). "Guernier (Charles)". Dictionnaire des parlementaires français de 1940 à 1958 (in French). Vol. 4. E-K. Paris: La Documentation française.
- Jolly, Jean (1960–1977). "Charles Guernier". Dictionnaire des parlementaires français (1889-1940) (in French). Paris: Presses universitaires de France. ISBN 2-1100-1998-0.
- Suisman, David; Strasser, Susan (2011-10-11). Sound in the Age of Mechanical Reproduction. University of Pennsylvania Press. ISBN 978-0-8122-0686-9.
- Wieviorka, Olivier (2009). Orphans of the Republic: The Nation's Legislators in Vichy France. Harvard University Press. ISBN 978-0-674-03261-3.
