= Camille Blaisot =

French politician and lawyer

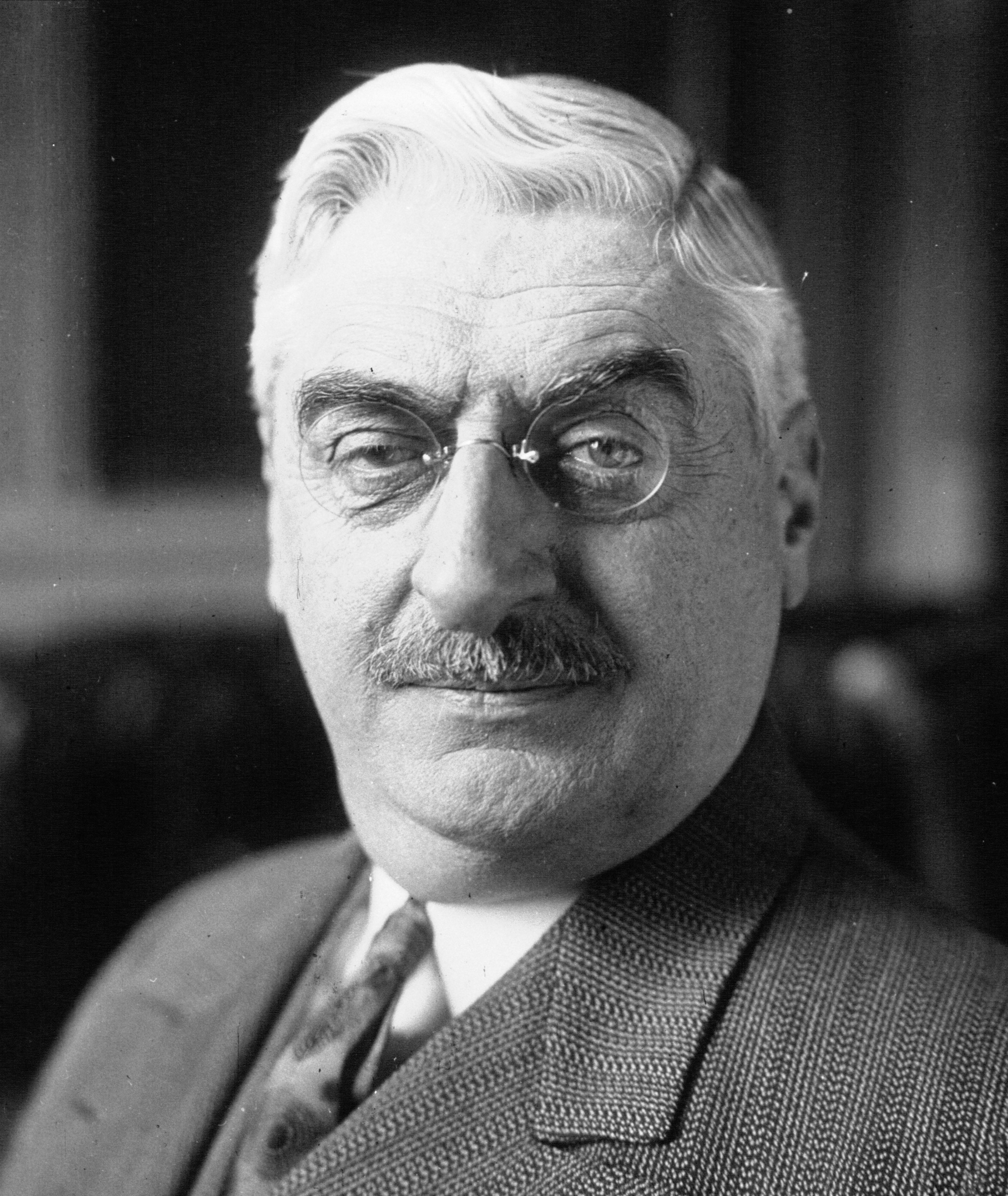

Member of the Chamber of Deputies for Calvados
- In office 1914–1942

Personal details
- Born: 19 January 1881 Valognes, France
- Died: 24 January 1945 (aged 64) Dachau, Nazi Germany
- Party: Republican Federation
- Profession: Lawyer

Camille Blaisot (French: [kamij blɛzo]; 19 January 1881 – 24 January 1945) was a French politician and lawyer.

Blaisot was born in Valognes and was elected in 1914 to represent Caen in the Chamber of Deputies. He served as Minister of Health in 1931 and 1932 under Pierre Laval and André Tardieu, and again in 1935 and 1936 under Laval. He broke with the government over arms sales to the Soviet Union, and in the late 1930s Blaisot was associated with the Liberty Front created by Jacques Doriot.

Blaisot did not vote in the parliamentary sessions at Vichy which granted extraordinary powers to Marshal Philippe Pétain and created the Vichy Regime. His attitude and activities led to his arrest by German security forces on 2 March 1944. He was initially held in a camp near Compiègne and later sent to Dachau concentration camp where he died in 1945.

A number of schools and streets are named in his honour.
