= Charles Daniélou =

French politician (1878–1953)

Charles Léon Claude Daniélou
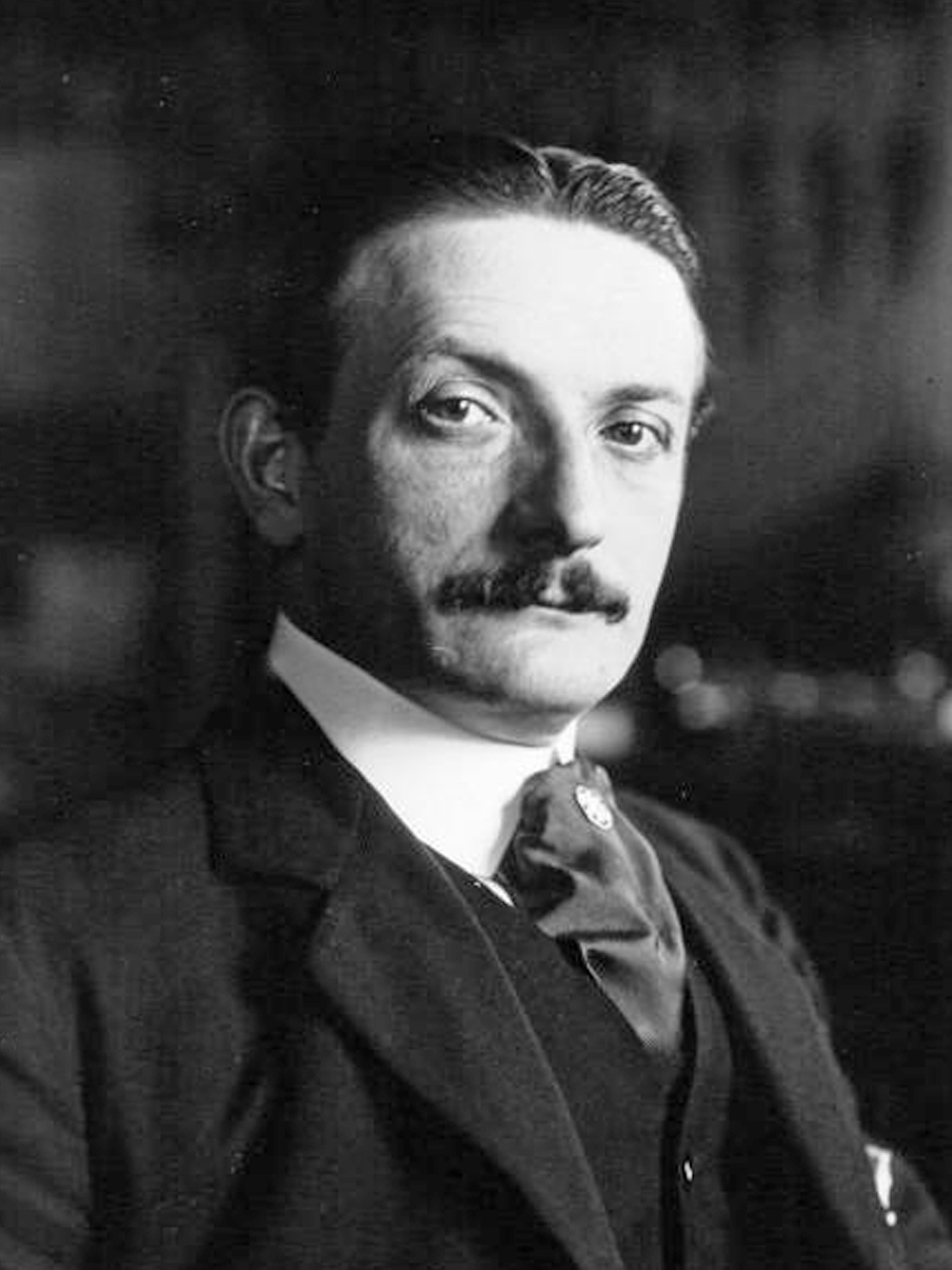
- Daniélou in 1914

Minister of Merchant Marine
- In office 21 February 1930 – 2 March 1930
- Prime Minister: Camille Chautemps
- Preceded by: Louis Rollin
- Succeeded by: Louis Rollin
- In office 13 December 1930 – 27 January 1931
- Prime Minister: Theodore Steeg
- Preceded by: Louis Rollin
- Succeeded by: Louis de Chappedelaine

Minister of Health
- In office 18 December 1932 – 26 October 1933
- Prime Minister: Joseph Paul-Boncour
- Preceded by: Justin Godart
- Succeeded by: Émile Lisbonne

Personal details
- Born: 13 July 1878 Douarnenez, Finistère, France
- Died: 30 December 1953 (aged 75) Neuilly, Seine, France
- Occupation: Author, journalist

Charles Léon Claude Daniélou (13 July 1878 – 30 December 1953) was a French politician who was Minister of the Merchant Marine in 1930–1931 and Minister of Health in 1932–1933).

== Early years ==
Charles Léon Claude Daniélou came from a prosperous Breton family with the strong tradition of political activity. His great-grandfather, Jean-Marie Daniélou (1764–1814), was mayor of Locronan under Napoleon. His grandfather, Jean-Pierre Daniélou (1798–1864), was a notary in Locronan and then Douarnenez, where he was mayor during the French Second Republic from April 1848 to January 1949. His father, Eugène-Lucien-Napoléon Daniélou (1834–1897) was a wealthy wine merchant and one of the leading businessmen in Douarnenez, where he was several times mayor between 1855 and 1896. Eugène Daniélou was a militant Republican and atheist, and would not marry in church or allow his children to be baptized.

Charles Léon Claude Daniélou was born on 13 July 1878 in Douarnenez, Finistère. His parents were unmarried. Tradition says that he was baptized by a washerwoman. Charles attended the local school with the sons of fishermen, then attended the lycée in Brest for his secondary education. He studied to enter the Navy, but failed the medical examination due to his poor eyesight. He began writing poetry, and in 1897 sent a copy of his first collection of poems to François Coppée, who invited him to come to Paris.

Daniélou moved to Paris in 1897 and was drawn into the circle of Coppée and José-Maria de Heredia. He was converted to Christianity and baptized in 1897. He met literary and political figures such as Henri de Régnier, Pierre Louÿs, Gabriel Hanotaux, Louis Barthou, Georges Leygues, Émile Zola and Sarah Bernhardt. Daniélou was present at the last meeting between Zola and Coppée during the Dreyfus affair. Zola had decided to publish his J'Accuse…!, in which he proclaimed that Dreyfus was innocent, despite pleas by Coppée. Daniélou sided with Coppée and helped found the anti-Dreyfus Ligue de la patrie française in December 1898. Daniélou started to contribute to the Parisian journals such as Les Annales de la Vie française, l'Homme libre, Le Petit Journal, Paris-Midi, l'Eclair and Le Soleil. He published several collections of verse, and published two adventure novels in the Echo de Paris.

Daniélou married Madeleine Clamorgan on 27 July 1904. She was daughter of General Clamorgan, and an agrégée in Literature. She later wrote several books on education and founded various free educational institutions for women. While Charles Daniélou became known for his anti-clericalism, his wife was always a devout Catholic. She founded the Order of Sainte-Marie. After their marriage the couple settled in Locronan, where Charles Daniélou was elected as a municipal councilor in 1908, running as an Independent Republican. He became mayor in 1912, and retained that position until 1944. He worked to preserve the Renaissance architecture of the small town, and in 1934 founded a museum of local art. There were six children from the marriage including Jean Daniélou, who became a Catholic cardinal and Catherine, wife of Georges Izard. Their son Louis Daniélou joined the navy and died in 1942 during World War II. Alain Daniélou became a well-known historian.

== National politics ==
Daniélou ran for election to the legislature for the first district of Châteaulin, Finistère, in April–May 1910, and won on the second round. At first he sat with the Liberal Action group, but in 1911 joined the Progressive Republicans. He introduced a bill to ensure that sailors had religious freedom and another to provide subsidies for repairing school buildings. He ran for reelection in April–May 1914, but was defeated. He ran again in the general elections on 16 November 1919 as a Radical on the Republican Concentration list, and was successful. He joined the group of Left Republicans. On 19 April 1921 the prime minister Aristide Briand appointed him "commissioner for French expansion abroad."

Daniélou was reelected on 11 May 1924 on the Republican list. He joined the Radical Left group, where he remained for the rest of his career. He was president of this group more than once. He was under-secretary of state for Ports, Merchant Marine and Fishery from 17 April 1925 to 9 March 1926. He held this post in the 3rd cabinet of Paul Painlevé and the 8th Briand cabinet. In the 9th Briand cabinet formed on 9 March 1926 he was appointed under-secretary of state for the president of the Council and Foreign Affairs, and retained this position in the 10th Briand cabinet until it fell on 17 July 1926.

Daniélou was reelected on the second round in the elections of 22–29 April 1928. He was appointed Minister of Merchant Marine in the short-lived cabinet of Camille Chautemps from 21–25 February 1930. He was again Minister of Merchant Marine in the cabinet of Théodore Steeg from 13 December 1930 to 21 January 1931. He was reelected in the second round in the elections of 1–8 May 1932. He was appointed Minister of Health on 18 December 1932 in the cabinet of Paul Boncour, and kept this post in the 1st cabinet of Édouard Daladier, which fell on 24 October 1933. He was defeated in the second round in the elections of April–May 1936.

Daniélou remained mayor of Locronan until 1944. After the Liberation of France he left politics and devoted himself to the association of former parliamentarians, of which he was president. Charles Daniélou died at the age of 75 on 30 December 1953 in Neuilly, Seine.

== Publications ==
The official biography in the Dictionnaire des parlementaires français (1889–1940) records that Daniélou was noticed by François Coppée when he was 21, and published his first collection of verse, Ascension, in 1903. This was followed by Rayonnements (1904), Armoricaines (1905), Heures lyriques (1906) and J'ai regardé derrière moi (1909). He also published two adventure novels in the L'Écho de Paris, namely La Fortune de Richemer and Le Crime du Député Ronan Conan. Other fiction included Le Capitaine Trinitas and stories published as Les veillées fabuleuses. He wrote a historical study of Finistère and many political works on the merchant marine, the army and so on. The Bibliothèque nationale de France lists the following:

- Daniélou, Charles. La Chanson des casques, poèmes (in French). Paris: Perrin E. Figuière. p. 192.
- Daniélou, Charles (1899). Ascension (in French). Paris: Perrin. p. 222.
- Daniélou, Charles (1906). Heures lyriques et chrétiennes (in French). Paris: Perrin, A. Fontemoing. p. 112.
- Daniélou, Charles (1909). J'ai regardé derrière moi... (in French). Paris: A. Fontemoing. p. 53.
- Daniélou, Charles (1913). Études contemporaines (in French). Paris: E. Figuière. p. 219.
- Daniélou, Charles (1916). De l'Yser à l'Argonne : images du front. Pages actuelles : 1914–1916 (in French). Paris: Bloud et Gay. p. 64.
- Daniélou, Charles (1922). Les Veillées fabuleuses (in French). Paris: Eugène Figuière éditeur. p. 247.
- Daniélou, Charles (1922). Les Armoricaines : poèmes. Collection moderne (in French). Paris: Figuière. p. 224.
- Daniélou, Charles (1923). Le traité de Trianon (in French). Paris: E. Figuière. p. 213.
- Daniélou, Charles (1925). Le Fantôme de Richemer (in French). Paris: E. Figuière. p. 238.
- Daniélou, Charles (1926). Des poèmes sous la lampe (in French). Paris: Eugène Figuière. p. 96.
- Daniélou, Charles (1926). Le Crime de Ronan Conan (in French). Paris: Eugène Figuière éditeur. p. 237.
- Daniélou, Charles (1927). La Marine marchande (in French). Paris, Bruxelles: E. Figuière. p. 288.
- Daniélou, Charles (1927). Le Carnet d'un parlementaire (in French). Paris: E. Figuière. p. 256.
- Daniélou, Charles (1930). Paroles nationales (in French). Paris: E. Figuière. p. 251.
- Daniélou, Charles (1931). L'Armée navale (in French). Paris: Impr. spéciale et éditions Eugène Figuière. p. 285.
- Daniélou, Charles (1935). Le vrai visage d'Aristide Briand (in French). Paris: E. Figuière. p. 282.
- Daniélou, Charles (1936). La Santé publique (in French). Paris: Eugène Figuière. p. 255.
- Daniélou, Charles (1937). preface. La France d'outre-mer. By Luigi de Pace. J. Pietrini, translator. Paris: la Technique du Livre. p. 239.
- Daniélou, Charles (1945). Dans l'intimité de Marianne (in French). Paris: Musy : (Impr. de E. Pigelet). p. 367.

== Sources ==
- "Charles Daniélou (1878–1953)" (in French). Bibliothèque nationale de France.
- collectif (1994). "Daniélou (Charles, Léon, Claude". Dictionnaire des parlementaires français de 1940 à 1958 (in French). Vol. 3. C-D. Paris: La documentation française. ISBN 978-2110029836.
- Gourlay, Patrick (1996). "Charles Daniélou (1878–1958). La brillante et atypique carrière d'un Finistérien sous la Troisième République" (PDF). Annales de Bretagne et des Pays de l'Ouest (in French). 103 (4): 99–121. doi:10.3406/abpo.1996.3888.
- Jolly, Jean (1960–1977). "Daniélou (Charles, Léon, Claude". Dictionnaire des parlementaires français (1889–1940). Paris: Presses universitaires de France. ISBN 2-1100-1998-0.
- Kirkup, James (1994-02-04). "Obituary: Alain Danielou". The Independent.
