= Louis Rollin =

French politician (1879–1952)

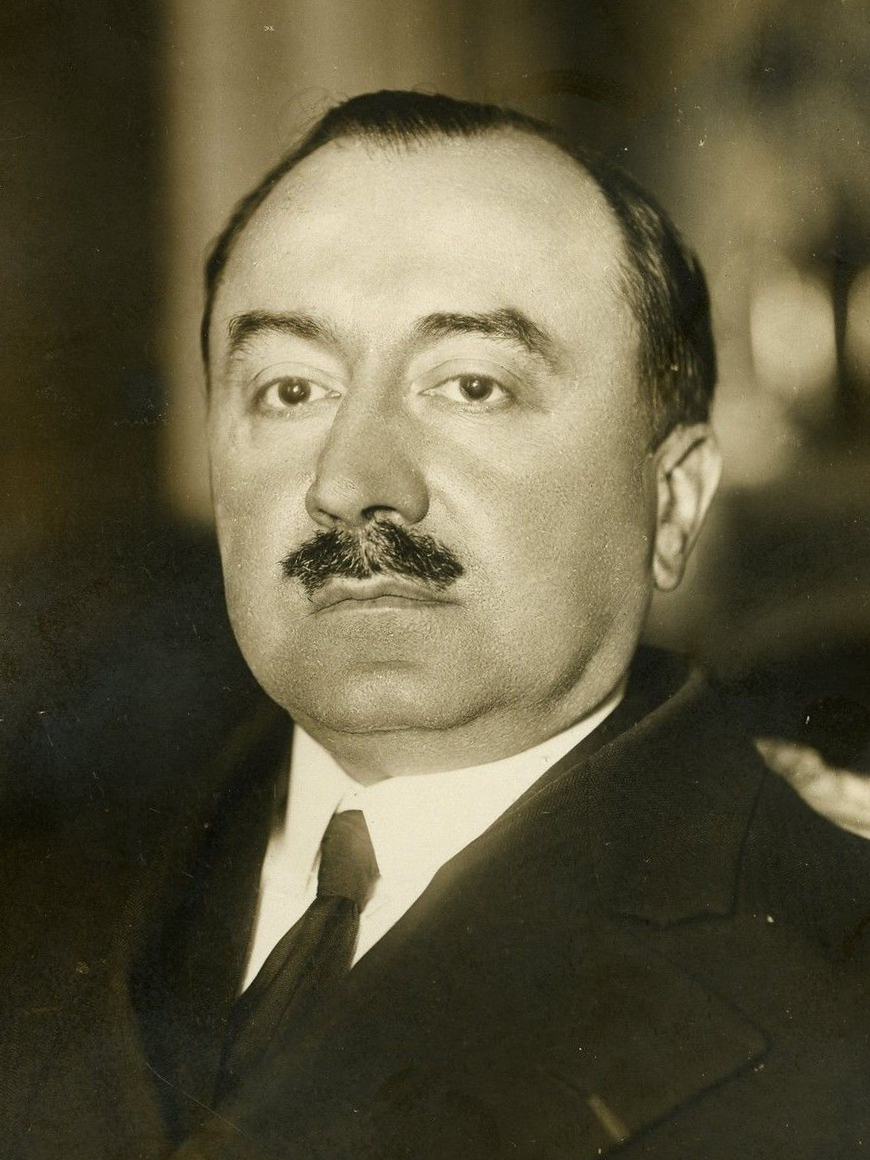
- Rollin in 1931

Minister of Merchant Marine
- In office 3 November 1929 – 21 February 1930
- Prime Minister: André Tardieu
- Succeeded by: Charles Daniélou

Minister of Merchant Marine
- In office 2 March 1930 – 13 December 1930
- Prime Minister: André Tardieu
- Preceded by: Charles Daniélou
- Succeeded by: Charles Daniélou

Minister of Commerce and Industry
- In office 27 January 1931 – 20 February 1932
- Prime Minister: Pierre Laval
- Preceded by: Louis Loucheur
- Succeeded by: self

Minister of Commerce, Posts, Telegraphs and Telephones
- In office 20 February 1932 – 3 June 1932
- Prime Minister: André Tardieu
- Preceded by: self (Commerce & Industry); Charles Guernier (PTT)
- Succeeded by: Julien Durand (Commerce & Industry); Henri Queuille (PTT)

Minister of Colonies
- In office 13 October 1934 – 24 January 1936
- Prime Minister: Gaston Doumergue, Pierre Etienne Flandin, Fernand Bouisson, Pierre Laval
- Preceded by: Pierre Laval
- Succeeded by: Jacques Stern

Minister of Commerce and Industry
- In office 21 March 1940 – 18 May 1940
- Prime Minister: Paul Reynaud
- Preceded by: Fernand Gentin
- Succeeded by: Léon Baréty

Minister of Colonies
- In office 18 May 1940 – 16 June 1940
- Preceded by: Georges Mandel
- Succeeded by: Albert Rivière

Personal details
- Born: 27 March 1879 Uzerche, Corrèze. France
- Died: 3 November 1952 (aged 73) Paris, France

Louis Marie Joseph Etienne Rollin (French pronunciation: [lwi maʁi ʒozɛf etjɛn ʁɔlɛ̃]; 27 March 1879 – 3 November 1952) was a French politician who was a minister in several cabinets in the period between the two world wars.

== Early years (1879–1919) ==
Louis Marie Joseph Etienne Rollin was born on 27 March 1879 in Uzerche, Corrèze. He studied classics in Limoges before moving to Paris where he obtained his law degree at the age of 21. He became an attorney at the Paris court of appeal, and would retain this position throughout his political career. Rollin joined the Republican Federation (Fédération républicaine) and in 1910 was elected municipal councilor for the 6th arrondissement of Paris, and councilor-general for the Seine. He ran for election to the legislature in 1914 but was defeated in the second round. He volunteered for the army during World War I (1914–18) and was awarded the Croix de Guerre and the Legion of Honour.

== Inter-war politics (1919–39) ==
After the war Rollin became vice-president of the general council of the Seine. On 16 November 1919 he was elected deputy for the 3rd district of the Seine on the platform of the Entente républicaine et démocratique (Democratic and Republican Alliance). He joined the Républicains de gauche (Left Republicans) in the chamber. He was reelected in 1924, 1928, 1932 and 1936. He became a member of the committee of Foreign Affairs, on which he sat until 1940, and other committees. He had liberal views, and aimed to rebuild the country after the war, while respecting freedom, maintaining peace and protecting the weak.

Rollin was Minister of Merchant Marine in two successive governments of André Tardieu between 3 November 1929 and 12 December 1930. He authorized construction of the liner SS Normandie, which became the pride of the French passenger fleet. Rollin was a member of three cabinets led by Pierre Laval between 27 January 1931 and 20 February 1932 as Minister of Commerce and Industry . After the fall of the Laval government he was Minister of Commerce, Posts, Telegraphs and Telephones in the cabinet of André Tardieu from 20 February to 3 June 1932. He was Minister of Colonies from 13 October 1934 to 24 January 1936 in the successive governments of Gaston Doumergue, Pierre-Étienne Flandin, Fernand Bouisson and Pierre Laval.

During 1933 and 1934 Rollin was among those who worked hard to find places at French universities for Jewish scholars fleeing Nazi persecution in Germany. In 1938 he petitioned the government to stop jailing Jewish refugees on the grounds that it was counterproductive and inhumane. In the spring of 1939, he pleaded with the government to implement the amnesty plan under which Jewish refugees could "reconstruct their lives on a dignified and stable foundation ... in France or elsewhere."

== World War II (1939–45) ==
During World War II (1939–45) Rollin was Minister of Commerce and Industry in the cabinet of Paul Reynaud from 21 March 1940 to 16 May 1940. He was then Minister of the Colonies from 18 May 1940 to 16 June 1940. He opposed signature of the armistice after the German invasion of France, but on 10 July 1940 voted in favor of giving Marshal Philippe Pétain full executive powers. After the constitutional changes of 11 July 1940 he broke with the Vichy government.

Rollin returned from Vichy to occupied Paris on 30 July 1940. He came into contact with the French Resistance group Ceux de la Libération-Vengeance, and transmitted military intelligence to the allies with the aid of the engineer Pierre Schnell, who had a secret transmitter. As a councilor of Paris he obtained false papers and lodgings for escaped prisoners, resistance fighters whom the authorities were seeking and Jews. He hid weapons, and hosted "Colonel Rémy" (Gilbert Renault), deputy head of the Marco Polo network.

On 21 April 1944 Rollin and all others who voted for Pétain on 10 July 1940 were made ineligible to sit in parliament. On 24 April 1945 a jury of honor chaired by René Cassin found against him since he could not provide evidence of his activity during the German occupation. On 29 April 1945 Rollin was reelected councilor for the Seine. The election was challenged and a new jury of honor heard his case. This time Paul Reynaud, who had returned from Germany, spoke in his favor, as did Pierre Schnell, and the jury decided to remove his ineligibility.

== Later career (1945–52) ==
After the draft constitution from the first constituent assembly was rejected in a referendum, Rollin ran for election for the second constituent assembly on the platform of the Parti républicain de la liberté (PRL, Republican Party of Liberty) and was elected on 2 June 1946 as deputy for the Seine. Rollin and Frédéric Dupont headed the PRL list in the election for the first legislature of the French Fourth Republic, and were both reelected in November 1946. Rollin was again elected on 17 June 1951 on a list of the Union des indépendants et des républicains nationaux (Union of Independents and National Republicans). Louis Rollin died on 3 November 1952 in Paris.

== Mandates ==
Rollin's mandates in the National Assembly or Chamber of Deputies were:

From	To	Constituency	Political group
16 November 1919	31 May 1924	Seine	Entente républicaine démocratique
11 May 1924	31 May 1928	Seine	Républicains de gauche
29 April 1928	31 May 1932	Seine	Républicains de gauche
1 May 1932	31 May 1936	Seine	Députés du centre républicain
26 April 1936	31 May 1942 (Note: A decree in July 1939 extended the mandate of deputies who had been elected in May 1936 to 31 May 1942.)	Seine	Alliance of Républicains de gauche and Radicaux indépendants
2 June 1946	27 November 1946	Seine	Parti républicain de la liberté
10 November 1946	4 July 1951	Seine	Parti républicain de la liberté
17 June 1951	3 November 1952	Seine	Républicains indépendants

== Publications ==
- Jacques Launey; Louis Rollin (preface) (1931). L'Évolution comparative des charges de l'Industrie française. Impôts. Salaires. Dividendes au cours des vingt dernières années (in French). Paris: impr. Chantenay; Libr. générale de droit et de jurisprudence. p. 374.
- Louis Rollin; Henri Tasso (1935). Chambre de commerce et d'industrie Marseille-Provence (ed.). Inauguration du Musée des colonies à Marseille et commémoration du tricentenaire des Antilles et de la Guyane (in French). Marseille: Société anonyme du "Sémaphore". p. 71.
- René-H. Bernard; Louis Rollin (preface) (24 January 1935). L'Organisation pratique de la vente (in French). Nantes: Impr. du commerce, rue Santeul. p. 344.
- Louis Rollin (1937). Hygiène mentale et prophylaxie criminelle; les morbides psychiques devant la loi (in French). Paris: F. Nathan. p. 40.
- Louis Rollin (1945). Horizons (in French). Paris: Éditions du Moustié (Impr. la Ruche). p. 113.
- Louis Rollin (1946). La Grande espérance de la Libération a été trahie (in French). Paris: Parti républicain de la liberté : (Impr. de L. Hardy). p. 16.

== Sources ==
- Caron, Vicki (1999). Uneasy Asylum: France and the Jewish Refugee Crisis, 1933–1942. Stanford University Press. ISBN 978-0-8047-4377-8.
- Collectif (2015). "Rollin (Louis Marie Joseph Etienne)". Référence:Biographie de la IVe République (in French). Paris: Assemblée nationale.
- Jolly, Jean (1960–1977). "Rollin (Louis Marie Joseph Etienne)". Dictionnaire des parlementaires français; notices biographiques sur les ministres, députés et sénateurs français de 1889 à 1940 (in French). Paris: Presses universitaires de France. ISBN 2-1100-1998-0.
- "Louis, Marie, Joseph, Etienne ROLLIN: Mandats..." (in French). Assemblée nationale.
