= Léon Meyer =

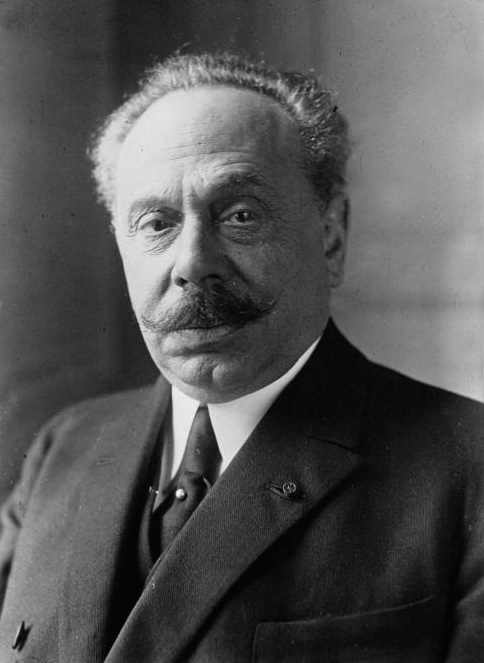
- Meyer in 1924

Minister of Merchant Marine
- In office 4 June 1932 – 31 January 1933
- Preceded by: Charles Guernier
- Succeeded by: Eugène Frot

Personal details
- Born: 11 September 1868 Le Havre, Seine-Inférieure, France
- Died: 22 January 1948 (aged 79) Paris, France
- Occupation: Broker

Léon Meyer (11 September 1868 – 22 January 1948) was a French freight broker and Radical politician from the port city of Le Havre. He was mayor of Le Havre from 1919 to 1941, and a national deputy from 1923 to 1941. He was Minister of Merchant Marine in 1932–33. As a Jew he was removed from office during World War II (1939–45), and in 1944 was deported and spent 17 months in concentration camps.

== Early years (1868–1923) ==
Léon Meyer was born on 11 September 1868 in Le Havre, Seine-Inférieure. After completing school he became a freight broker, and was elected president of the Chambre des courtiers assermentés. (Note: The courtier de marchandises assermenté (sworn freight broker) is both a trader and a public officer. They connect sellers and buyers of goods, negotiate the terms of the deal, close the deal and ensure its proper implementation.) In 1904 he was elected to the municipal council of Le Havre and the general council of the Seine-Inférieure department. He was praised for his efforts in office during World War I (1914–18). In the winter of 1918–19 Meyer led the Radical group in Le Havre that denounced the inadequacy of municipal efforts to supply the markets and small businesses.

Meyer was elected mayor of Le Havre in November 1919 and started more vigorous efforts to supply the city. After the war the unions demanded that foreign workers leave the port to make way for French workers. Meyer helped organize the return to their country of Moroccans, asserting that unlike Algerians they could not be assimilated. Later, as deputy mayor in Le Havre Meyer supported societies of black sailors in the port, but said they "must observe absolute political neutrality and keep themselves apart from workers' struggles." This had the effect of making them reluctant to join the left-wing Union des travailleurs nègres (UTN).

== National politics (1923–39) ==
Meyer ran successfully for election to the chamber of deputies in a by-election on 10 June 1923 as the sole candidate of the Union of the Left. He was reelected for the same constituency in the general elections of May 1924, and for the first district of Le Havre in the elections of 2928, 1932 and 1936. Throughout his parliamentary career he sat with the Radical Republican and Radical Socialist group. Meyer was under secretary of state for Merchant Marine from 14 June 1924 to 17 April 1925 in the cabinet of Édouard Herriot. He was under secretary of state for the National Economy from 8 December 1930 to 27 January 1931 in the cabinet of Théodore Steeg. He was Minister of Merchant Marine from 4 June 1932 to 31 January 1933 in the successive cabinets of Herriot and Paul Boncour.

Following the 1936 May Day demonstrations, on 9 May 1936 the factory director at the Bréguet Aviation factory in Le Havre fired two militants. This triggered a sit-in strike by 500 workers. As mayor of the city Meyer refused a call by the company director to use police to evict the strikers, but did dispatch 100 police and 60 gendarmes to surround the plant. He obtained acceptance of an arbitration agreement under which the two militants would be reinstated. The agreement also covered pay for the two days lost to the strike, which the management was forced to accept. In June 1936 he was among the Radicals such as Camille Chautemps and Georges Bonnet who saw the recent strikes as part of a communist conspiracy and were seeking ways to break up the Popular Front.

== World War II (1939–45) ==
During World War II Meyer voted on 10 July 1940 in favor of the constitutional law that gave full powers to Marshal Philippe Pétain. During the German occupation of France Meyer was stripped of his mandate as deputy under the act of 2 June 1941 on the status of Jews. He moved to Bordeaux, then to Grenoble and to nearby Uriage with his wife and daughter. He participated in the French Resistance in Uriage region.

On 6 February 1944 the Meyer family was arrested and transferred to the Drancy internment camp. Meyer's arrest appears to have been because he was Jewish rather than for his resistance work, although the Minister of Veteran Affairs later considered that he was a political deportee. Meyer was deported to Bergen-Belsen concentration camp and then to Theresienstadt concentration camp. His daughter, Denise Meyer (born 1896), was also taken to the camp at Terezín and also survived, helped by the level of protection enjoyed by her father. He was liberated by the Allies after 17 months and returned to Le Havre.

== Last years (1945–48) ==
In the elections to the first national constituent assembly on 21 October 1945 Meyer headed the list of the Radical Party. He was strongly criticized during the campaign for his hasty departure from Le Havre when the Germans advanced in 1940, and received only 9% of the votes. Feeling disillusioned and unwelcome in Le Havre, Meyer spent his last years in Paris. Léon Meyer died in Paris on 22 January 1948.

== Legacy ==
Meyer was an officer of the Legion of Honor.

Place Léon Meyer in Le Havre is named after him, as is the nearby medical centre.

== Mandates ==
Meyer's mandates in the chamber of deputies were:

Elected	Term end	Department / Constituency	Parliamentary group
1923-06-10	1924-05-31	Seine-Inférieure	Parti radical et radical socialiste
1924-05-11	1928-05-31	Seine-Inférieure	Radical et radical-socialiste
1928-04-29	1932-05-31	Seine-Inférieure / 1st district of Le Havre	Républicain radical et radical-socialiste
1932-05-01	1936-05-31	Seine-Inférieure / 1st district of Le Havre	Républicain radical et radical-socialiste
1936-05-03	1941-11-19	Seine-Inférieure / 1st district of Le Havre	Républicain radical et radical-socialiste

== Publications ==
- Meyer, Léon. preface. Normandie, Bretonsko, atlantické pláze. By Darras, Victor. (in Breton). Paris.
- Meyer, Léon (1911). La Défense du petit commerce devant le Conseil général de la Seine-Inférieure (in French). Le Havre: impr. de O. Randolet. p. 23.
- Meyer, Léon (1925). preface. Transports et Tarifs de chemins de fer. By Poupy, Georges (in French). Paris: libr. scientifique et générale Jules Charles et A. Brunet. p. 200.
- Meyer, Léon (1937). Face au péril révolutionnaire: élections cantonales du 10 octobre 1937, [Le Havre], à mes concitoyens (in French). Le Havre: impr. Gremond, Michel et Cie. p. 26.

== Sources ==
- Alexander, Martin S.; Graham, Helen (2002-06-06). The French and Spanish Popular Fronts: Comparative Perspectives. Cambridge University Press. ISBN 978-0-521-52422-3.
- Barzman, John (January–March 1995). "Entre l'émeute, la manifestation et la concertation: la "crise de la vie chère" de l'été 1919 au Havre". Le Mouvement Social (170, Regards Américains). Editions l'Atelier on behalf of Association Le Mouvement Social: 61–84. doi:10.2307/3779143. JSTOR 3779143.
- Barzman, John; Saunier, Eric (2005). Migrants dans une ville portuaire : Le Havre (XVIe-XXIe siècle). Publication Univ Rouen Havre. ISBN 978-2-87775-778-2.
- Chapman, Herrick (1991). State Capitalism and Working-class Radicalism in the French Aircraft Industry. University of California Press. ISBN 978-0-520-07125-4.
- collectif (2005). "Léon MEYER". Dictionnaire des parlementaires français de 1940 à 1958 (in French). Vol. 5. L-O. Paris: La Documentation française. ISBN 2-11-005990-7.
- Jolly, Meyer (1960–1977). "Frot (Léon)". Dictionnaire des parlementaires français; notices biographiques sur les ministres, députés et sénateurs français de 1889 à 1940 (in French). Paris: Presses universitaires de France. ISBN 2-1100-1998-0.
- "Léon MEYER" (in French). Assemblée nationale.
- Rosenhaft, Eve; Aitken, Robbie John Macvicar (2013). Africa in Europe: Studies in Transnational Practice in the Long Twentieth Century. Liverpool University Press. ISBN 978-1-84631-847-4.
- Weiner, Pavel; Weiner, Karen; Dwork, Debórah (2012). A Boy in Terezín: The Private Diary of Pavel Weiner, April 1944 – April 1945. Northwestern University Press. ISBN 978-0-8101-2779-1.
- Wieviorka, Olivier (2009). Orphans of the Republic: The Nation's Legislators in Vichy France. Harvard University Press. ISBN 978-0-674-03261-3.
