= Yann Daniélou =

French footballer (born 1966)

Personal information
- Date of birth: 10 April 1966 (age 60)
- Place of birth: Paris, France
- Height: 1.86 m (6 ft 1 in)
- Position: Defender

Team information
- Current team: Marseille (academy manager)

Youth career
- 1971–1981: Paotred Rosko Roscoff
- 1981–1983: Stade Léonard Kreisker

Senior career*
Years	Team	Apps	(Gls)
1983–1985	Stade Léonard Kreisker	16	(2)
1985–1990	Brest Armorique B	97	(16)
1986–1990	Brest Armorique	26	(0)
1990–1992	Guingamp	62	(2)
1992–1993	Tours	32	(5)
1993–1995	Laval	84	(8)
1995–1997	Perpignan	83	(5)
1997–1999	Nîmes	57	(3)
1999–2000	Marsouins		
Total		457	(41)

Managerial career
- 1999–2000: Marsouins (player/coach)
- 2000–2003: Marsouins
- 2003–2008: Brest (academy manager)
- 2006–2007: Brest B
- 2008–2010: Amiens SC B
- 2010–2013: Al-Shabab (assistant)
- 2013–2015: Ajaccio (assistant)
- 2015: RS Berkane (technical director)
- 2015–2016: Standard Liège (assistant)
- 2016–2017: Mechelen (assistant)
- 2018–2019: Dijon (assistant)
- 2020: Djibouti (technical director)
- 2022: Al-Shabab (technical director)
- 2022–: Marseille (academy manager)
- 2022: Marseille B
- * Club domestic league appearances and goals

Yann Daniélou (born 10 April 1966) is a former French football defender. He spent most of his career as a player in the second division. From 2022, he is the academy manager of Ligue 1 club Marseille.
