= François Piétri =

French politician (1882–1966)

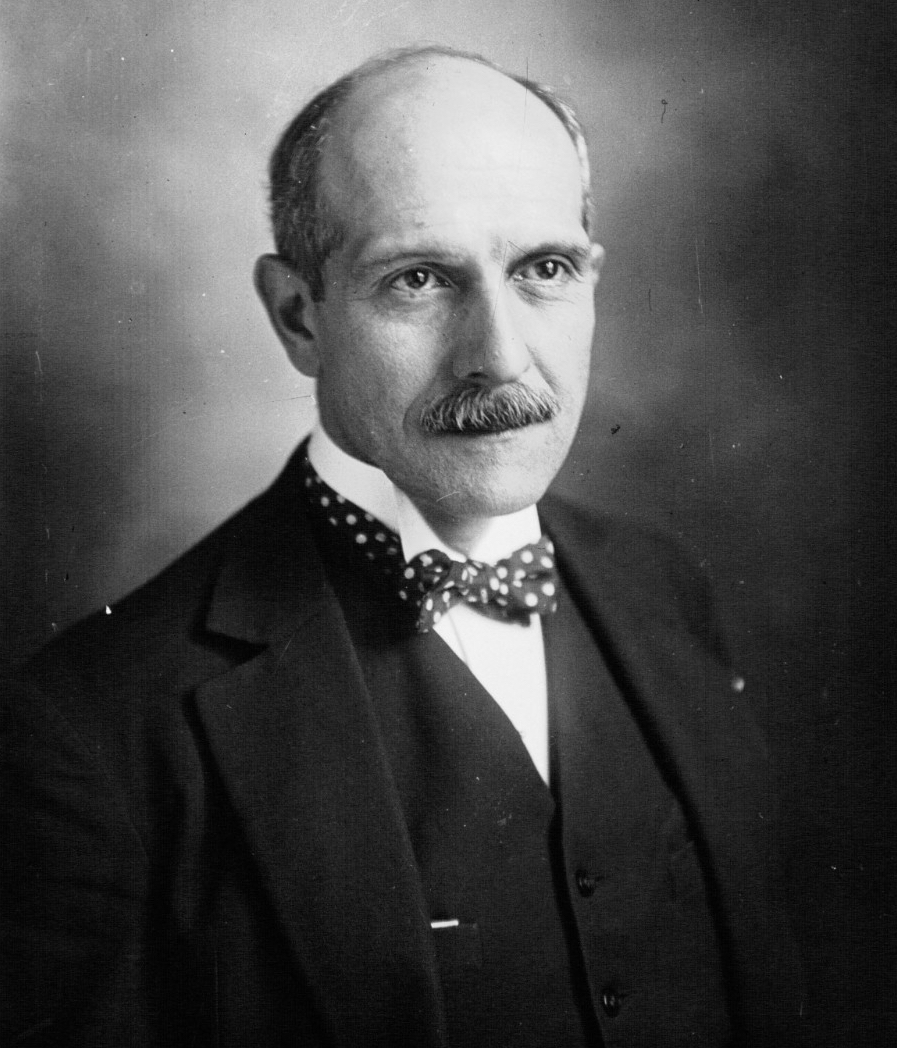

Vichy France Ambassador to Francoist Spain
- In office 1940–1944
- Preceded by: Position established
- Succeeded by: Position abolished

Member of the National Assembly from Corsica
- In office 6 November 1924 – 26 March 1942

Personal details
- Born: 10 August 1882 Bastia, Corsica
- Died: 17 August 1966 (aged 84) Ajaccio, Corsica
- Party: Radical
- Other political affiliations: Democratic Republican Alliance
- Education: Collège Stanislas de Paris; Paris Institute of Political Studies

François Piétri (French: [fʁɑ̃swa pjetʁi]; 8 August 1882 – 17 August 1966) was a French politician and writer who served as a minister in several governments in the later years of the French Third Republic and was French ambassador to Spain from 1940 to 1944 under the Vichy regime.

== Biography ==
Born in Bastia, Corsica to Antoine-Jourdan Piétri, a lawyer and préfecture councilman, and Clorinde Gavini, the daughter of a French National Assembly member. In addition, two of his uncles were Senators in the Second Empire. Piétri graduated from Collège Stanislas in 1899 and moved on to the École libre des sciences politiques for his university education. He was selected for the French Civil Service in 1906 as an auditor (Inspecteur des finances) and progressed through the ranks to the post of Directeur général des finances du Maroc - Director of Finances for Morocco - a role he filled from 1917 to 1924.

Piétri was a member of the Radical Party.

== Political career ==
In 1924, Piétri was elected to the National Assembly and remained in office there until 1942. During that time, he occupied a number of responsibilities, including:

- Undersecretary of State for Finance (Sous-secrétaire d'État aux finances) in 1926
- Minister for Colonial Affairs (Ministre des colonies) in 1929–1930 and again in 1933
- Minister of the Budget (Ministre du budget) in 1931–1932
- Defense Minister (Ministre de la défense nationale) in 1932
- Finance Minister (Ministre des finances) for just one week in early 1934
- Minister of Merchant Marine 1–7 June 1935
- Naval Minister (Ministre de la marine) in 1934–1936
- Minister of Posts, Telegraphs, and Telephones briefly in 1940 after the German invasion.

He remained involved in French politics during the Nazi occupation of France, becoming the Vichy ambassador to Spain from 1940 to 1944. He received the Order of the Francisque.

After the war, he was condemned in absentia to five years' indignité nationale by the High Court. Avoiding politics after returning to France, he received the Académie Française's Grand prix Gobert in 1956 for his historical works.

Piétri died in 1966 in Ajaccio.
