= Marius Roustan =

French politician

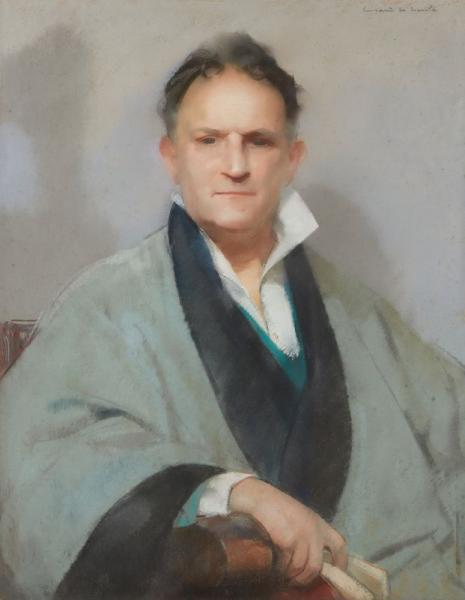
- Born: 20 February 1870; Sète, Hérault, France
- Died: 3 February 1942 (aged 71); Montpellier, Hérault, France
- Occupation: Politician

Marius Roustan, also known as Mario Roustan, (February 20, 1870–February 3, 1942) was a French politician. He served as a member of the French Senate from 1920 to 1941, representing Hérault.

== Works ==
- The Pioneers of the French Revolution (1926), a translation of his Les philosophes et la société française au XVIIIe siècle (1907)
