= William Bertrand =

French politician (1881–1961)

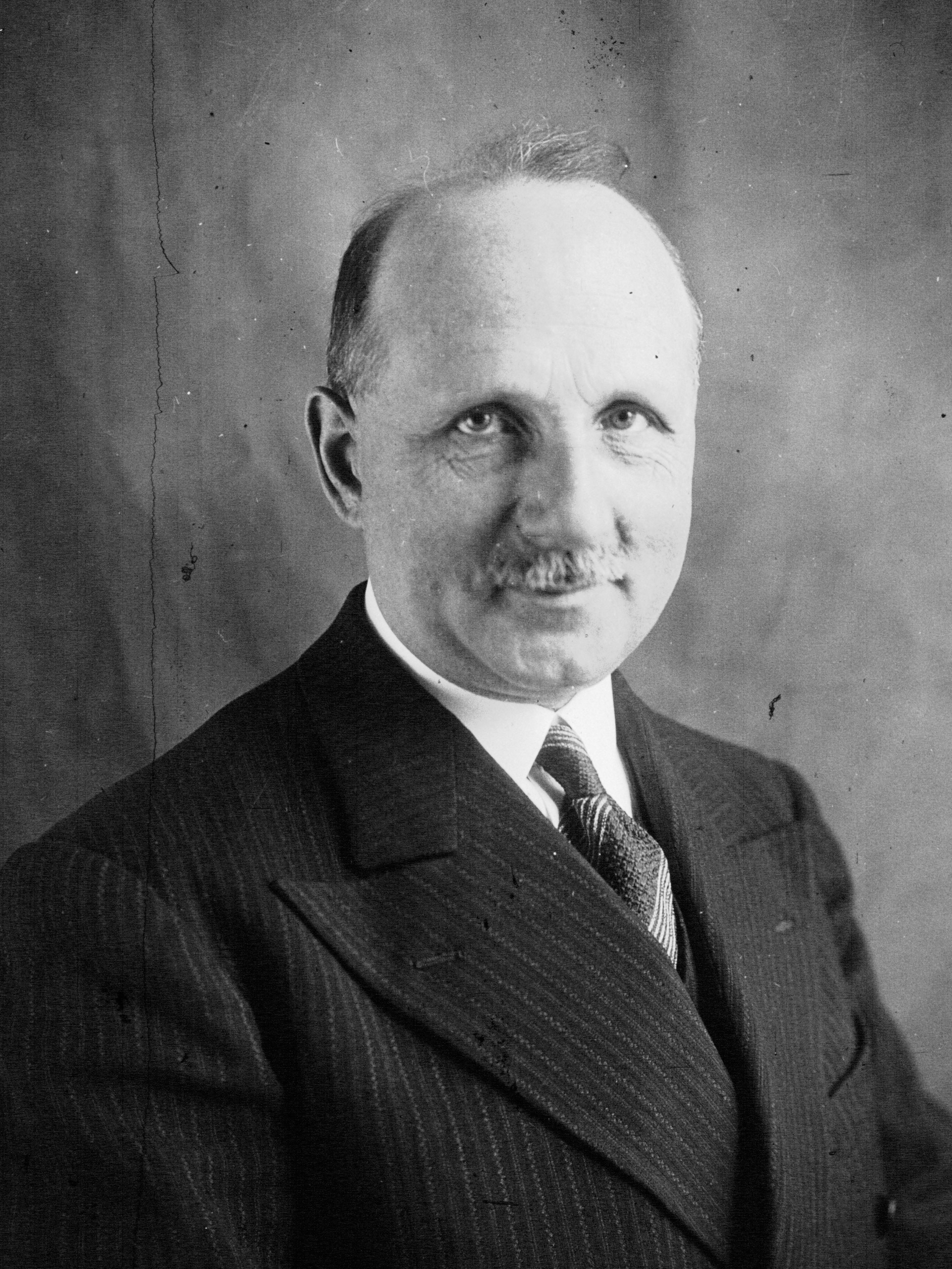
William Bertrand

William Bertrand (9 November 1881, Marennes, Charente-Maritime – 7 December 1961, Le Coudray-Macouard) was a French politician. He mas a member of the Radical Party and served as a cabinet minister, as a member of the Chamber of Deputies and as a Senator, representing Charente-Maritime.

On 10 July 1940, he voted in favour of granting the cabinet presided by Marshal Philippe Pétain authority to draw up a new constitution, thereby effectively ending the French Third Republic and establishing Vichy France.
