= Louis de Chappedelaine =

French politician (1876–1939)

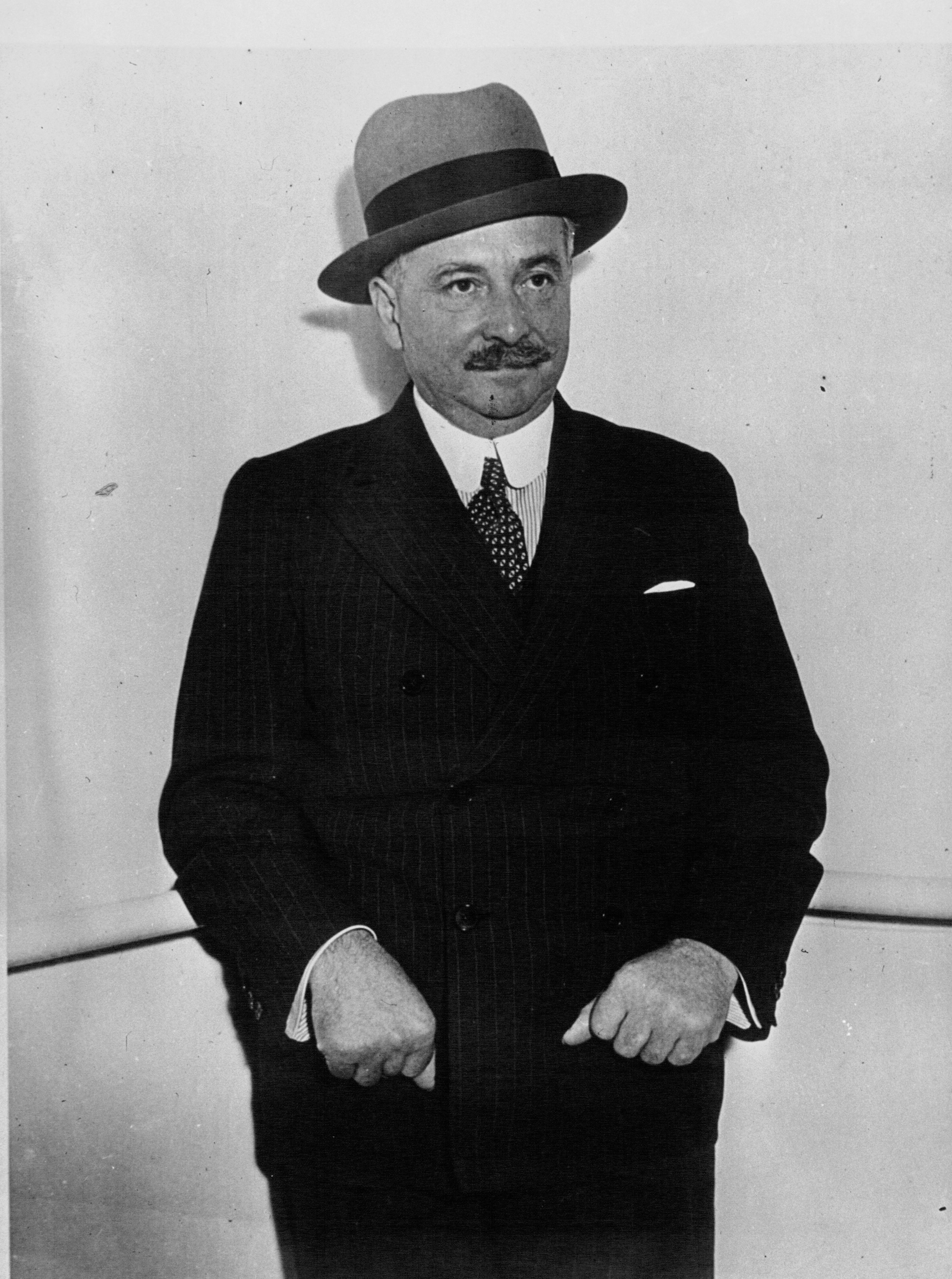
- Born: 21 June 1876; Saint-Just, Ille-et-Vilaine, France
- Died: 9 December 1939 (aged 63); Ville-d'Avray, Seine-et-Oise, France
- Occupation: Politician
- Parent(s): Édouard-Joseph-Marie de Chappedelaine; Anaïs, Marie-Louise du Bouays de Couesbouc

Louis-Marc-Michel, comte de Chappedelaine (21 June 1876, Saint-Just, Ille-et-Vilaine – 9 December 1939, Ville-d'Avray, Seine-et-Oise) was a French politician. He served as a member of the Chamber of Deputies from 1910 to 1939, representing Côtes-du-Nord. He was the Minister of Merchant Marine from 27 January to 16 February 1932, Minister of Colonies from 20 February to 10 May 1932, Minister of Military Marine from 30 January to 7 February 1934, Minister of Merchant Marine from 24 January to 4 June 1936, and again from 10 April 1938 to 13 September 1939.

== Biography ==
The son of Édouard-Joseph-Marie de Chappedelaine, a naval officer, and Anaïs-Marie-Louise du Bouays de Couësbouc, he became a lawyer. Mayor of Plénée-Jugon, where he owned the Château de la Villeneuve Sainte-Odile (and also the Château de Beaubois in Bourseul), and a member of the Côtes-du-Nord General Council since 1908, he was elected deputy for the Côtes-d'Armor in 1910. He joined the Popular Liberal Action group. He was re-elected continuously until his death.

He served as Minister of the Merchant Marine from January 27, 1931, to February 16, 1932 (under the Pierre Laval I, II, and III administrations), as Minister of the Colonies from February 20, 1932, to May 10, 1932 (under the Tardieu III administration), Minister of the Navy from January 30, 1934, to February 7, 1934 (Daladier II administration), and Minister of the Merchant Marine from January 24, 1936, to June 4, 1936 (Sarraut II administration) and from April 10, 1938, to September 13, 1939 (Daladier III administration).

He married Yvonne de Chavagnac, the daughter of Marquis Édouard de Chavagnac and Céleste Le Gonidec de Traissan.

In his memoirs, Louis Mermaz reveals that he and his brother Michel are the sons of an illegitimate, secret relationship—which lasted 30 years—between his mother and Louis de Chappedelaine. In revealing this fact in 2013, Louis Mermaz confides that, throughout his public career, he feared that the revelation of this secret origin would put him in a difficult position.
