= Édouard Daladier =

French radical socialist politician

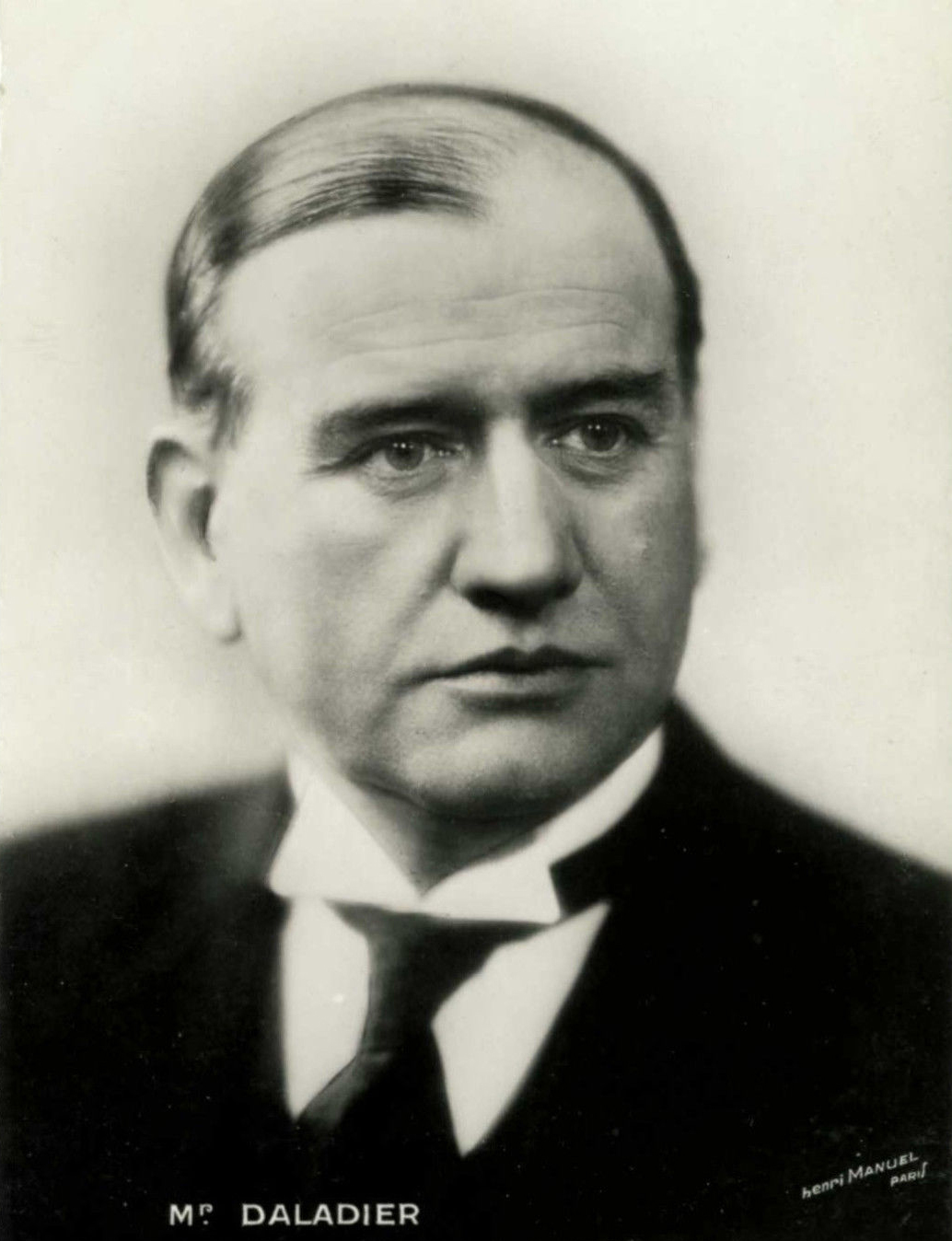
- Daladier in the 1930s

Prime Minister of France
- In office 10 April 1938 – 21 March 1940
- President: Albert Lebrun
- Preceded by: Léon Blum
- Succeeded by: Paul Reynaud
- In office 30 January 1934 – 9 February 1934
- President: Albert Lebrun
- Preceded by: Camille Chautemps
- Succeeded by: Gaston Doumergue
- In office 31 January 1933 – 26 October 1933
- President: Albert Lebrun
- Preceded by: Joseph Paul-Boncour
- Succeeded by: Albert Sarraut

Minister of Defence
- In office 4 June 1936 – 18 May 1940
- Prime Minister: Léon Blum; Camille Chautemps; Himself
- Preceded by: Louis Maurin
- Succeeded by: Paul Reynaud
- In office 18 December 1932 – 29 January 1934
- Prime Minister: Joseph Paul-Boncour; Himself
- Preceded by: Joseph Paul-Boncour
- Succeeded by: Jean Fabry

Member of the Chamber of Deputies
- In office 2 June 1946 – 8 December 1958
- Constituency: Vaucluse
- In office 16 November 1919 – 10 July 1940
- Constituency: Vaucluse

Personal details
- Born: 18 June 1884 Carpentras, Vaucluse, France
- Died: 10 October 1970 (aged 86) Paris, France
- Party: Radical-Socialist
- Spouses: Madeleine Laffont (m. 1917; died 1932) Jeanne Boucoiran (m. 1951)
- Children: 3
- Education: Collège-lycée Ampère
- Profession: Historian; teacher
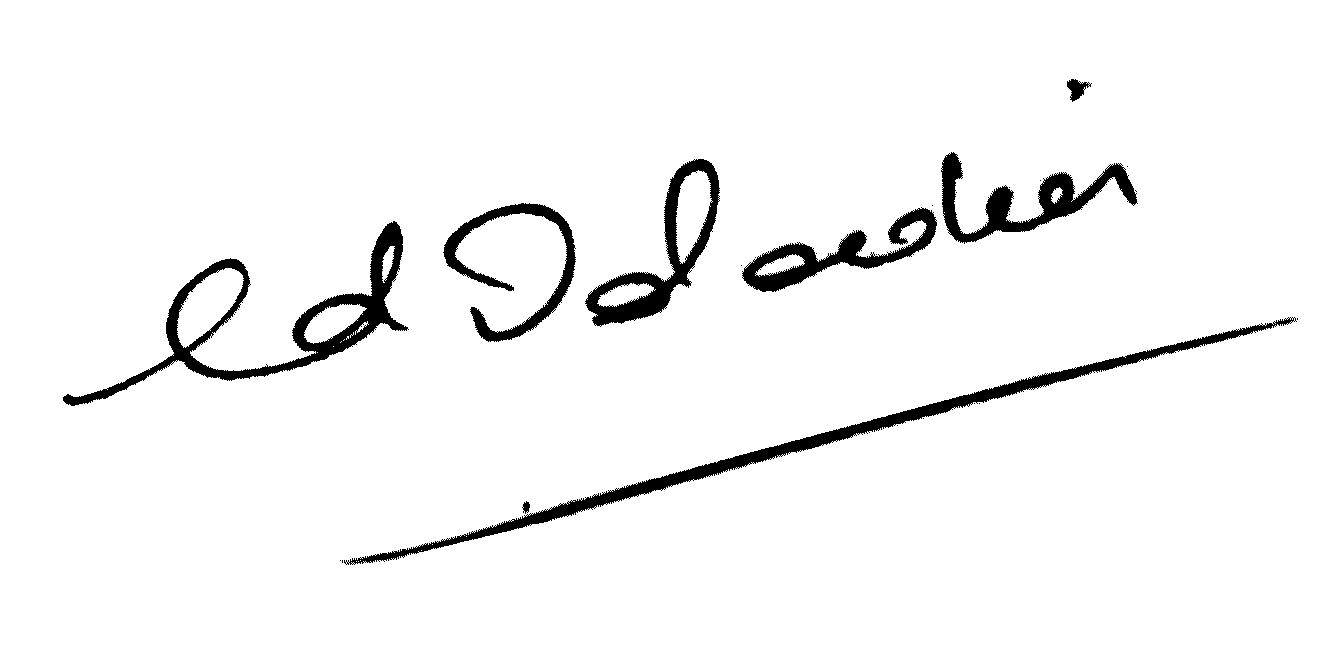
- Signature

Military service
- Allegiance: France
- Branch: French Army
- Service years: 1914–1919; 1945
- Rank: Captain
- Conflicts / battles: World War I; Battle of Verdun; World War II; Battle for Castle Itter

Édouard Daladier (French: [edwaʁ daladje]; 18 June 1884 – 10 October 1970) was a French Radical-Socialist (centre-left) politician, who was the Prime Minister of France in 1933, 1934 and again from 1938 to 1940.

Daladier was born in Carpentras and began his political career before World War I. During the war, he fought on the Western Front and was decorated for his service. After the war, he became a leading figure in the Radical Party and Prime Minister in 1933 and 1934. Daladier was Minister of Defence from 1936 to 1940 and Prime Minister again in 1938. As head of government, he expanded the French welfare state in 1939.

Along with Neville Chamberlain, Benito Mussolini and Adolf Hitler, Daladier signed the Munich Agreement in 1938, which gave Nazi Germany control over the Sudetenland. After Hitler's invasion of Poland in 1939, Britain and France declared war on Germany. During the Phoney War, France's failure to aid Finland against the Soviet Union's invasion during the Winter War led to Daladier's resignation on 21 March 1940 and his replacement by Paul Reynaud. Daladier remained Minister of Defence until 19 May, when Reynaud took over the portfolio personally after the French defeat at Sedan.

After the Fall of France, Daladier was tried for treason by the Vichy government during the Riom Trial and imprisoned first in Fort du Portalet, then in Buchenwald concentration camp, and finally in Itter Castle. After the Battle of Castle Itter, Daladier resumed his political career as a member of the French Chamber of Deputies from 1946 to 1958. He died in Paris in 1970.

== Early life ==
Daladier was born in Carpentras, Vaucluse, on 18 June 1884, the son of a village baker. He received his formal education at the lycée Duparc in Lyon, where he was first introduced to socialist politics. After his graduation, he became a school teacher and a university lecturer at Nîmes, Grenoble and Marseille and then at the Lycée Condorcet, in Paris, where he taught history. He began his political career by becoming the mayor of Carpentras, his home town, in 1912. He subsequently sought election to the Paris Chamber of Deputies but lost to a Radical-Socialist Party candidate; he later joined that party.

Daladier had received military training before the war under France's conscription system. In August 1914, he was mobilised at the age of 30 with the French Army's 2nd Foreign Infantry Regiment when World War I started with the rank of sergeant. In mid-1915, the 2nd Foreign Infantry Regiment was destroyed in heavy fighting against the Imperial German Army on the Western Front. The surviving remnant of it was assigned to other units, Daladier being transferred into the 209th Infantry Regiment. In 1916, he fought with the 209th in the Battle of Verdun and was given a field commission as a lieutenant in the midst of the battle in April 1916 having received commendations for gallantry in action. In May 1917, he received the Legion of Honour for gallantry in action and ended the war as a captain leading a company. He had also been awarded the Croix de Guerre.

After his demobilisation, he was elected to the Paris Chamber of Deputies for Orange, Vaucluse, in 1919.

Later, he would become known to many as "the bull of Vaucluse" because of his thick neck, large shoulders and determined look. However, cynics also quipped that his horns were like those of a snail.

== Interwar period ==
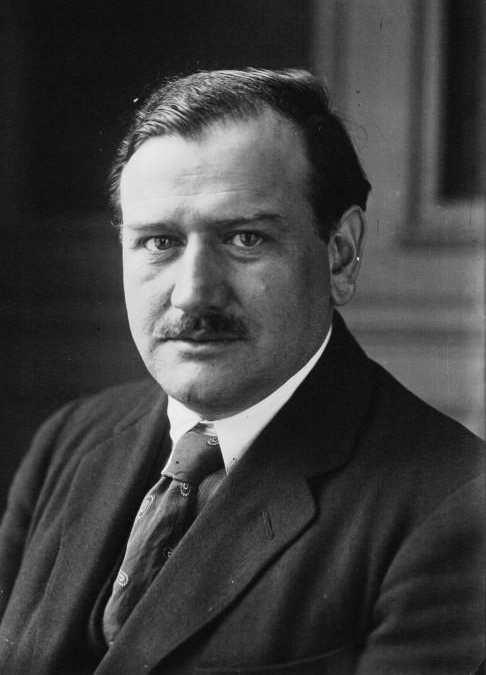
Daladier in 1924

After he entered the Chamber of Deputies, Daladier became a leading member of the Radical-Socialist Party and was responsible for building it into a structured modern political party. For most of the interwar period, he was the chief figure of the party's left wing, supporters of a governmental coalition with the socialist Section française de l'Internationale ouvrière (SFIO). A government minister in various posts during the coalition governments between 1924 and 1928, Daladier was instrumental in the Radical-Socialists' break with the SFIO in 1926, the first Cartel des gauches with the centre-right Raymond Poincaré in November 1928. In 1930, he unsuccessfully attempted to gain socialist support for a centre-left government in coalition the Radical-Socialist and similar parties. In 1933, despite similar negotiations breaking down, he formed a government of the republican left.

In January 1934, he was considered the most likely candidate of the centre-left to form a government of sufficient honesty to calm public opinion after the revelations of the Stavisky Affair, a major corruption scandal. The government lasted less than a week, however, since it fell in the face of the 6 February 1934 riots. After Daladier fell, the coalition of the left initiated two years of right-wing governments.

After a year of being withdrawn from frontline politics, Daladier returned to public prominence in October 1934 and took a populist line against the banking oligarchy that he believed had taken control of French democracy: the Two Hundred Families. He was made president of the Radical-Socialist Party and brought the party into the Popular Front coalition. Daladier became Minister of National Defence in the Léon Blum government and retained the crucial portfolio for two years. Besides for serving as Defence Minister, Daladier was appointed the chairman of the newly founded Supreme Defence Committee. At the first meeting of the committee on 26 June 1936, Daladier complained that other nations had someone to direct their defence policies, citing the example of the War Minister Field Marshal Werner von Blomberg in Germany; the Defence Commissar Marshal Kliment Voroshilov in the Soviet Union; Benito Mussolini in Italy and Sir Thomas Inskip in Britain. Daladier stated from now on he would be playing that role in France. He then moved on to say that the first order of business was the nationalisation of the entire French arms industry as he accused French arms firms of failing to provide the military with the necessary weapons on time or in full, and stated that henceforward the French state would take direct control of all production. Daladier had a difficult relationship with Marshal Maxime Weygand-a man whom he greatly disliked-but Daladier was very close to Weygand's successor, Maurice Gamelin, whose views and judgements on military matters he greatly trusted and valued.

Daladier was much influenced by intelligence reports from the Deuxième Bureau that the factories of the German arms firms such as Krupp AG, Rheinmetall AG, and Borsig AG were being run at full capacity, suggesting that the Reich was preparing for war in the near-future. Daladier complained that Germany as the world's second largest economy had an automatic head-start in the arms race while France as the world's fourth largest economy was by definition behind the Reich in terms of arms production. In early July 1936, Daladier appeared by the Defence Committees of the Chamber of Deputies and the Senate to warn that Germany was winning the arms race; the Wehrmacht would soon field 650,000 men; and that the Wehrmacht was buying tanks in massive numbers to win a "war of movement". Gamelin expressed much concern to Robert Jacomet, a senior civil servant at the Defence Ministry about the plans for nationalization of the arms industry, which he described as a "left-wing gimmick" instead of being a practical policy to win the arms race. Jacoment replied that Daladier was all for nationalization as he stated that "Time is short" and to create a "powerful parallel state industry" alongside the private sector arms industry would take too long. Jacoment stated: "Our interest is therefore to get our hands on the existing factories and modernise them fast". On 11 August 1936, the nationalization bill was approved by the National Assembly, and the French state took control of the arms industry.

As Defence Minister, Daladier asked the commander of the military, General Maurice Gamelin to submit a four-year plan for military modernization. When Gamelin submitted in a plan that was budgeted at 9 billion francs for the French Army, Daladier rejected it as too low and instead added in an extra 5 billion francs. During an "emotional" interview with Blum, Daladier persuaded him to accept the 14 billion franc plan as he issued a stark warning that the Reich was winning the arms race at present. On 7 September 1936, the Blum cabinet approved Daladier's 14 billion franc plan for rearmament. The American historian Joseph Maiolo wrote the rearmament program launched in 1936 was "the biggest arms program ever attempted by a French government in peacetime". As Defence Minister, Daladier favoured a hawkish line towards Italy, and in January 1937 played a crucial role in having Admiral François Darlan appointed commander of the Navy as Darlan saw Italy as France's primary opponent unlike his predecessor Admiral Georges Durand-Viel who was an admirer of Fascist Italy. The French Navy was not large enough to patrol both the Atlantic coastline and the Mediterranean Sea.

A key element in France's war plans against Germany was bringing in a massive number of soldiers from North Africa to France, and the prospect that Italy would cut the sea lanes linking Algeria to France was considered a major problem in Paris. Darlan argued that France needed control of the Mediterranean not because of the need for troops from Algeria, but because it was the only way for France to reach its allies in Eastern Europe and for reasons of trade. In the debate between Darlan vs. Maurice Gamelin who saw Italy more as a potential ally rather a potential enemy, Daladier came to favour Darlan. The Italian intervention in the Spanish Civil War along with Benito Mussolini's openly pro-German foreign policy convinced Daladier by late 1937 that Italy was only a potential enemy and it should be assumed that France became involved in a war with Germany that Italy would inevitably enter the war on the side of the Reich. At a meeting of Comité Permeant de la Défense National in November 1937, Daladier stated: "The hypothesis of conflict with the Mediterranean as the center of preponderant action, raises different problems for our foreign and military policy...Given the two-bloc composition [in the Atlantic and Asia] of the Franco-British empire, an attack in the Mediterranean, the stem between these two blocs would allow Germany and Italy to obtain the most decisive results". In addition, Daladier noted that the Mediterranean Sea via the Suez canal was equally important to the British as almost all of the shipping that linked the United Kingdom to its colonies in Asia went through the Mediterranean, and the possibility of a potential Italian naval threat was the best way of securing an alliance with Britain. Daladier pushed for war planning that called for making the defeat of Italy the first priority while France remained on the defensive against the Reich along the Maginot Line.

After the fall of the Blum government, Daladier became head of government again on 10 April 1938, orienting his government towards the centre and ending the Popular Front.

=== Munich Agreement ===
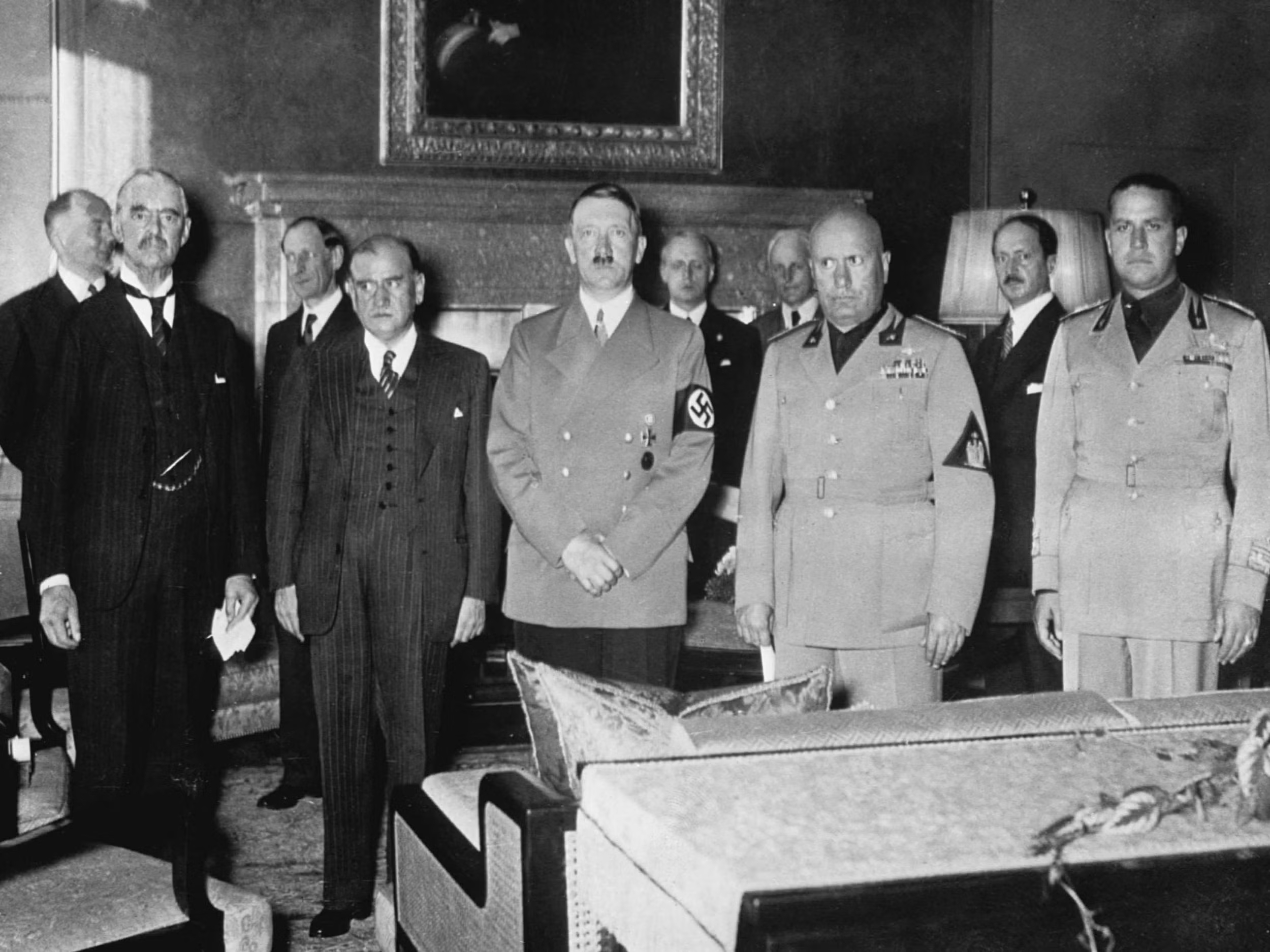
Neville Chamberlain, Daladier, Adolf Hitler, Benito Mussolini and Italian Foreign Minister Galeazzo Ciano, as they prepared to sign the Munich Agreement

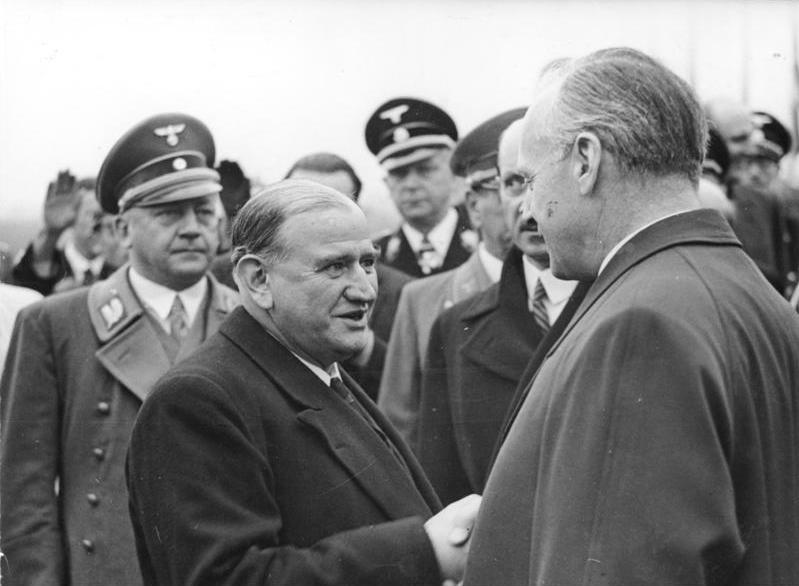
Édouard Daladier (centre) leaving Joachim von Ribbentrop after the Munich Conference 1938

Daladier's last government was in power at the time of the negotiations preceding the Munich Agreement during which France pressured Czechoslovakia to hand the Sudetenland to Nazi Germany. In April–May 1938, British Prime Minister Neville Chamberlain strongly but unsuccessfully pressed Daladier to renounce the French-Czechoslovak alliance, which led to Britain becoming involved in the crisis. From the British perspective, the problem was not the Sudetenland but the French-Czechoslovak alliance. British military experts were almost unanimous that Germany would defeat France in a war unless Britain intervened. The British thought that allowing Germany to defeat France would unacceptably alter the balance of power, and so Britain would have no choice but to intervene if a French-German war broke out. The Franco-Czechoslovak alliance would have turned any German attack on Czechoslovakia into a French–German war. As British Foreign Secretary Lord Halifax stated at a Cabinet meeting in March 1938, "Whether we liked or not, we had to admit the plain fact that we could not afford to see France overrun." At the Anglo-French summit in London on 28–29 April 1938, Chamberlain pressured Daladier to renounce the alliance with Czechoslovakia, only to be firmly informed that France would stand by its obligations, which forced the British to be involved very reluctantly in the Sudetenland Crisis. The summit of 28–29 April 1938 represented a British "surrender" to the French, rather than a French "surrender" to the British since Daladier made it clear France would not renounce its alliance with Czechoslovakia. Daladier's unwillingness to renounce France's alliance with Czechoslovakia forced the British very much against their will into involvement with the Sudetenland crisis since because the French refused to renounce the alliance led to the British taking the next best course of action, namely pressuring Czechoslovakia into concessions to the Sudeten Germans.

Unlike Chamberlain, Daladier had no illusions about Hitler's ultimate goals. In fact, he told the British in a late April 1938 meeting that Hitler's real aim was to eventually secure "a domination of the Continent in comparison with which the ambitions of Napoleon were feeble". Daladier went on to say, "Today, it is the turn of Czechoslovakia. Tomorrow, it will be the turn of Poland and Romania. When Germany has obtained the oil and wheat it needs, she will turn on the West. Certainly we must multiply our efforts to avoid war. But that will not be obtained unless Great Britain and France stick together, intervening in Prague for new concessions [i.e. to the Sudeten Germans] but declaring at the same time that they will safeguard the independence of Czechoslovakia. If, on the contrary, the Western Powers capitulate again, they will only precipitate the war they wish to avoid." At the same time, Daladier was well aware that France could not hope to win a war against Germany without the "continental commitment" that the British Empire would commit a large expeditionary force to the defence of France as had occurred in World War I. Furthermore, 60% of French imports came via the sea, making France dependent upon help from Britain, the world's largest naval power. The way that Italy came to be aligned with Germany from 1936 onward led to the majority of the French Navy being concentrated in the Mediterranean Sea to face a potential threat from Italy, leaving the French Atlantic coastline wide open to the German Navy, which led France to seek Britain as an ally to protect the Atlantic sea-lanes. The greater population of Germany left the French dependent upon bringing soldiers recruited in Algeria to France, and which in turn made the French Navy's primary task was in securing control of the western Mediterranean. Daladier had pushed very strongly during the London summit for Anglo-French naval staff talks for a possible war against Italy as he argued that both Britain and France needed command of the Mediterranean. Daladier had pressed Chamberlain for the Royal Navy to abandon the Singapore strategy of sending the main British battle fleet to Singapore to defend Britain's Asian colonies against a Japanese threat and instead wanted the Royal Navy concentrated in European waters.

The French economic situation was very worrying since the French franc had been devalued on 4 May 1938 for the third time since October 1936. Daladier wanted to stabilise the franc and so had fixed the exchange rate to 176 francs per pound sterling. The crisis of 20–22 May 1938 made the franc come under immense financial pressure since many investors did not wish to hold French assets or debts if France went to war. Jacques Rueff, the director of direction générale du mouvement des fonds and special adviser to Finance Minister, Paul Marchandeau, stated in a report that the government must cut defence spending or find more sources of short-term loans, as the French government was running out of money. Marchandeau stated that ordinary charges upon the treasury in 1938 would "exceed" 42 billion francs, and Rueff warned that France would go bankrupt once the legal limits upon short-term loans from the Bank of France was reached. Marchandeau, in testimony before the Senate Finance Committee, stated that the government had only 30 million francs in its account and 230 million francs available from the Bank of France.

As French government expenditure for the month of May 1938 alone totalled 4,500 million francs, the British historian Martin Thomas wrote, "Daladier's government was utterly reliant upon the success of its devaluation". To provide revenue, the government needed to sell more short-term bonds, but investors were highly reluctant to buy French bonds if Germany was threatening Czechoslovakia and put France on the brink of war. Because the franc was tied to the pound, France needed loans from Britain, which were not forthcoming, and so France was left "with its hands tied". British and American investors were unwilling to buy French bonds as long as the Sudetenland Crisis continued, which caused "severe monetary problems" for the French government in August–September 1938. Only when Daladier moved the "free-market liberal" Paul Reynaud from the Justice Ministry to the Finance Ministry in November 1938 did France regain the confidence of international investors, who resumed buying French bonds.

Reports from the embassy in Warsaw and the legations in Belgrade and Bucharest emphasised that Yugoslavia and Romania would probably do nothing if Germany invaded Czechoslovakia, and Poland might very well join in with Germany since the Teschen conflict between Poland and Czechoslovakia had made them bitter enemies. Of France's potential allies in Eastern Europe, only the Soviet Union, which had no border with Czechoslovakia, professed a willingness to come to Czechoslovakia's aid if Germany invaded, but both Poland and Romania were unwilling to extend transit rights for the Red Army, which presented major problems. Daladier was advised by General Maurice Gamelin that the Yezhovshchina which had seen a significant number of the Red Army's generals shot on charges of treason for Germany and Japan in 1937–1938 had destroyed the Red Army as an effective fighting force. Daladier was told by the French General Staff that the Red Army was "une belle facade" whose contribution to a war against Germany would be "almost zero".

On 25 September 1938, at the Bad Godesberg Summit, Hitler rejected Chamberlain's offer to have the Sudetenland join Germany in a few months, declared that the timeline was unacceptable and that the Sudetenland had to "go home to the Reich" by 1 October, and stated that the Polish and Hungarian claims against Czechoslovakia must also be satisfied by 1 October or Czechoslovakia would be invaded. Upon hearing what Hitler had demanded at the summit, Daladier told his cabinet that France "intended to go to war".

The next day, Daladier told his close friend, US Ambassador William Christian Bullitt Jr., that he would much prefer war to the "humiliation" of the Bad Godesberg terms.

Daladier ordered the French military to mobilise and to put France on a war footing, with a blackout being imposed at night so that German bombers would be not guided to French cities by the lights. On 26 September, Daladier ordered General Maurice Gamelin to London to begin staff talks with the Imperial General Staff. On 27 September, Gamelin, when asked by his chef de cabinet if Daladier was serious about war, replied, "He'll do it, he'll do it".

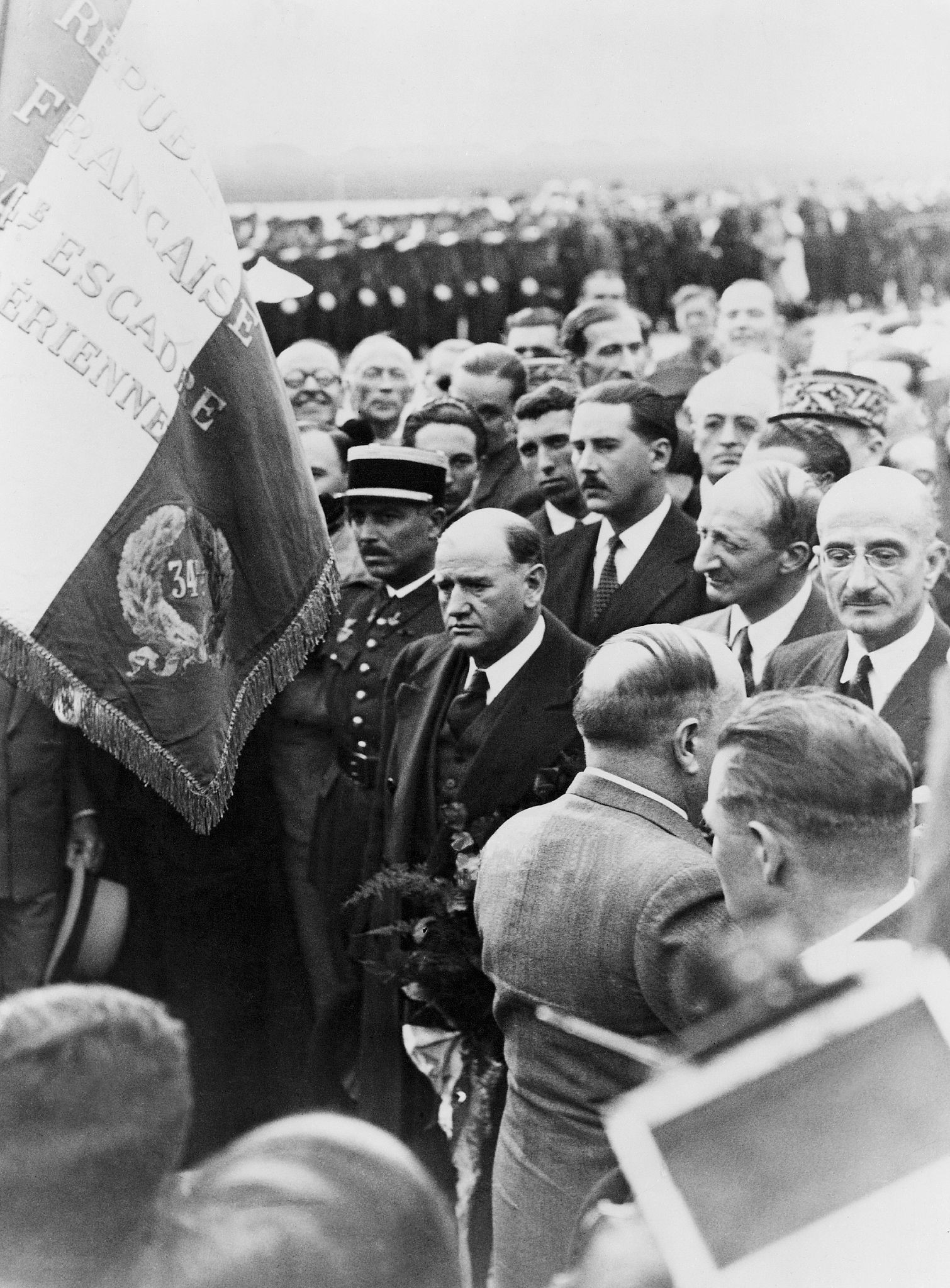
Daladier at the Bourget aerodrome after his return from Munich, 30 September 1938

However, on 29 September 1938, Chamberlain announced to the British House of Commons that he just received a phone call from Benito Mussolini, who said that Hitler had reconsidered his views and was now willing to discuss a compromise solution to the crisis in Munich. Ultimately, Daladier felt that France could not win against Germany without Britain on its side, and Chamberlain's announcement that he would be flying to Munich led him to attend the Munich Conference as well, which was held the next day on 30 September.

The Munich Agreement was a compromise since Hitler abandoned his more extreme demands such as settling the Polish and Hungarian claims by 1 October, but the conference concluded that Czechoslovakia was to turn over the Sudetenland to Germany within ten days in October and would be supervised by an Anglo-Franco-Italo-German commission. Daladier was happy to have avoided war but felt that the agreement he had signed on 30 September in Munich was a shameful treaty that had betrayed Czechoslovakia, France's most loyal ally in Eastern Europe. Although Daladier feared public hostility to the Munich Agreement on his return to Paris, he was acclaimed by the crowd, which cheered the fact that there would not be another war. Most famously, when he saw the enthusiastic crowds waving at his plane as it landed at Le Bourget Airfield before landing, he turned to his aide Alexis Léger (a.k.a. Saint-John Perse) and commented: "Ah! les cons! s'ils savaient..." ("Ah! The fools! If only they knew...").

=== Rearmament ===
Daladier had been made aware in 1932 by German rivals to Hitler that Krupp was manufacturing heavy artillery, and the Deuxième Bureau had a grasp of the scale of German military preparations but lacked hard intelligence of hostile intentions.

In October 1938, Daladier opened secret talks with the Americans on how to bypass the Neutrality Acts and to allow the French to buy American aircraft to make up for the underproductive French aircraft industry. Daladier commented in October 1938, "If I had three or four thousand aircraft, Munich would never have happened". He was most anxious to buy American war planes as the only way to strengthen the French Air Force. Major problems in the talks were how the French would pay for the American planes and how to bypass the Neutrality Acts.

In addition, France had defaulted on its World War I debts in 1932 and so fell foul of the 1934 Johnson Act, which banned American loans to nations that had defaulted on their World War I debts. In February 1939, the French offered to cede their possessions in the Caribbean and the Pacific, together with a lump sum payment of 10 billion francs, in exchange for the unlimited right to buy American aircraft on credit.

After tortuous negotiations, an arrangement was worked out in the spring of 1939 to allow the French to place huge orders with the American aircraft industry, but as most of the aircraft ordered had not arrived in France by 1940, the Americans arranged for French orders to be diverted to the British.

At a rally in Marseille in October 1938, Daladier announced a new policy: J'ai choisi mon chemin: la France en avant! ("I have chosen my path; forward with France!"). He stated that his government's domestic and foreign policies were to be based on "firmness". What that meant, in practice, was the end of the social reforms of the Popular Front government to increase French productivity, especially by ending the 40-hour work week. In a series of decree laws issued on 1 November 1938 by Finance Minister Paul Reynaud, which bypassed the National Assembly, the 40-hour work week was ended, taxes were sharply increased; social spending was slashed, defence spending was increased, the power of unions was restricted and (most controversially) Saturday was once again declared to be a workday. In a radio broadcast on 12 November 1938, Reynaud stated, "We are going blindfold towards an abyss". He also argued that however much pain his reforms might cause, they were absolutely necessary. As part of the effort to put the French economy on a war footing, Reynaud increased the military budget from 29 billion francs to 93 billion francs. In response, the French Communist Party called for a general strike to protest the decrees that ended almost all of the reforms of the Popular Front.

The one-day general strike of 30 November 1938, which pitted the government against unions supported by the Communist Party, proved to be the first test of Daladier's new policy of "firmness". Daladier declared a national emergency in response to the general strike, ordered the military to Paris and other major cities, suspended civil liberties, ordered the police to disperse striking workers with tear gas and to storm factories occupied by the workers and announced that any worker who took part in the strike would be fired immediately with no severance pay. After one day, the strike collapsed.

At the time, Daladier justified his policy of "firmness" under the grounds that if France was to face the German challenge, French production would have to be increased and said that was the price of freedom. At the same time, the energetic Colonial Minister Georges Mandel was set about organising the French Colonial Empire for war. He established armament factories in French Indochina to supply the French garrisons there to deter Japan from invading, increased the number of colonial "coloured" divisions from 6 to 12, built defensive works in Tunisia to deter an Italian invasion from Libya and organised the colonial economies for a "total war". In France itself, Mandel launched a propaganda campaign emphasising how the French colonial Empire was a source of strength under the slogan "110 million strong, France can stand up to Germany" in reference to the fact that the population of Germany was 80 million and that of France was 40 million, with the extra 70 million credited to France being the population of its colonies.

The 40-hour work week was abolished under Daladier's government, but a more generous system of family allowances was established and set as a percentage of wages: for the first child 5%, for the second child 10% and for each additional child 15%. Also created was a home mother allowance, which had been advocated by natalist and Catholic women's groups since 1929. All mothers who were not professionally employed and whose husbands collected family allowances were eligible for the new benefit. In March 1939, the government added 10% for workers whose wives stayed home to take care of the children. Family allowances were enshrined in the Family Code of July 1939 and, with the exception of the stay-at-home allowance, are still in force. In addition, a decree was issued in May 1938 to allow the establishment of vocational guidance centres. In July 1937, a new law, which was followed by a similar law in May 1946, empowered the Department of Workplace Inspection to order temporary medical interventions.

On 30 November 1938, a major crisis in Franco-Italian relations began with stage-managed "spontaneous" demonstrations in the Italian Chamber of Deputies. On cue, the Italian deputies rose up to shout "Tunis, Corsica, Nice, Savoy!" Mussolini had expected that his "Sudeten methods" would lead to France ceding Tunisia, Corsica, Nice and Savoy to Italy, but Daladier rejected the Italian demands completely. In his annual Christmas radio broadcast to the French people, Daladier gave what the British historian D.C. Watt called "an extremely tough speech" rejecting all of the Italian demands and warned that France would go to war to defend its territory.

The British historian Richard Overy wrote: "The greatest achievement of Daladier in 1939 was to win from the British a firm commitment", the so-called "continental commitment" that every French leader had sought since 1919. Daladier had a low opinion of Britain and told Bullitt in November 1938 that he "fully expected to be betrayed by the British.... he considered Chamberlain a desiccated stick; the King a moron; and the Queen an excessively ambitious woman.... he felt that England had become so feeble and senile that the British would give away every possession of their friends rather than stand up to Germany and Italy". In late 1938 to early 1939, the British embassy was bombarded with rumours from reliable sources within the French government that France would seek an "understanding" with Germany that would resolve all problems in their relations. The fact that French Foreign Minister Georges Bonnet was indeed seeking such an understanding lent credence to such rumours.

Daladier let Bonnet pursue his own foreign policy in the hope that it might finally spur the British into making the "continental commitment" since a France aligned with Germany would make the Reich Europe's strongest power and leave Britain with no ally of comparable strength in Europe. In January 1939, Daladier let the Deuxième Bureau manufacture the "Dutch War Scare". French intelligence fed misinformation to MI6 that Germany was about to invade the Netherlands with the aim of using Dutch air fields to launch a bombing campaign to raze British cities to the ground. As France was the only nation in Western Europe with an army strong enough to save the Netherlands, the "Dutch War Scare" led the British to make anxious inquiries in Paris to ask the French to intervene if the Netherlands were indeed invaded. In response, Daladier stated that if the British wanted the French to do something for their security, it was only fair for the British do something for French security. Daladier gave evasive answers to the British ambassador Sir Eric Phipps that France would do if Germany invaded the Netherlands, and that "French military authorities do not consider France is now in a position to defend herself without the military assistance from the United Kingdom". On 6 February 1939, Chamberlain, in a speech to the House of Commons, finally made the "continental commitment" as he told the House: "The solidarity that unites France and Britain is such that any threat to the vital interests of France must bring about the co-operation of Great Britain". On 13 February 1939, staff talks between the British Imperial General Staff and the French General Staff were opened.

Daladier supported Chamberlain's policy of creating a "peace front" that was meant to deter Germany from aggression but was unhappy with the British "guarantee" of Poland, which Chamberlain had announced to the House of Commons on 31 March 1939. France had been allied to Poland since 1921, but Daladier had been bitter by the German-Polish Nonaggression Pact of 1934 and the Polish annexation of part of Czechoslovakia in 1938. Like other French leaders, he regarded the Sanation regime ruling Poland as a fickle and unreliable friend of France. The rise in French industrial output and the greater financial stability in 1939 as a result of Reynaud's reforms led Daladier to view the possibility of war with the Reich more favourably than had been the case in 1938. By September 1939, France's aircraft production was equal to Germany's, and 170 American planes were arriving per month.

The Neutrality Acts were still in effect, but the supportive stance of US President Franklin Roosevelt led Daladier to assume that the Americans would maintain a pro-French neutrality and that their tremendous industrial resources would aid France if the Danzig Crisis ended in war.

Daladier was far keener than Chamberlain was to bring the Soviet Union into the "peace front" and believed that only an alliance with the Soviets could deter Hitler from invading Eastern Europe. During the Danzig crisis, Daladier was far more committed to bringing the Soviet Union into the "peace front" meant to deter Germany from invading Poland than was Chamberlain, and Daladier often expressed with the British "go slow" negotiating tactics with Moscow.

Daladier did not want a war with Germany in 1939 but sought to have such an overwhelming array of forces arranged against Germany that Hitler would be deterred from invading Poland. Daladier believed that Polish Guarantee by Britain would encourage Poland to object to having the Soviet Union join the "peace front", which indeed proved to be the case. The Poles refused to grant transit rights to the Red Army, which the Soviets made a precondition for their joining the "peace front". Daladier felt that Chamberlain should not have made guarantee until the Poles had agreed to grant transit rights to the Red Army. He charged that the guarantee made British and French diplomats have more leverage over Polish Foreign Minister Colonel Jozef Beck, who was widely disliked by other diplomats for his stubbornness and haughty manners.

Daladier felt that on economic and military grounds, it was better to have the Soviet Union serve as the "eastern pivot" of the "peace front" than for Poland to do so, as the British preferred. Daladier disliked the Poles and the guarantee but believed in maintaining the alliance with Poland; he believed that France should stand by its commitments.

A public opinion poll in June 1939 showed that 76% of the French believed that France should immediately declare war if Germany tried to seize the Free City of Danzig. For Daladier, the possibility that the Soviet Union might join the "peace front" was a "lifeline" and the best way of stopping another world war. He was deeply frustrated by the Polish refusal to permit transit rights for the Red Army.

On 19 August 1939, Beck, in a telegram to Daladier, stated: "We have not got a military agreement with the USSR. We do not want to have one".

Though the Molotov–Ribbentrop Pact of 23 August ruined Daladier's hopes of an Anglo-Franco-Soviet "peace front", he still believed that France and Britain could stop Germany together. On 27 August 1939, Daladier told Bullitt, "there was no further question of policy to be settled. His sister had put in two bags all the personal keepsakes and belonging he really cared about, and was prepared to leave for a secure spot at any moment. France intended to stand by the Poles, and if Hitler should refuse to negotiate with the Poles over Danzig, and should make war on Poland, France would fight at once".

== World War II ==
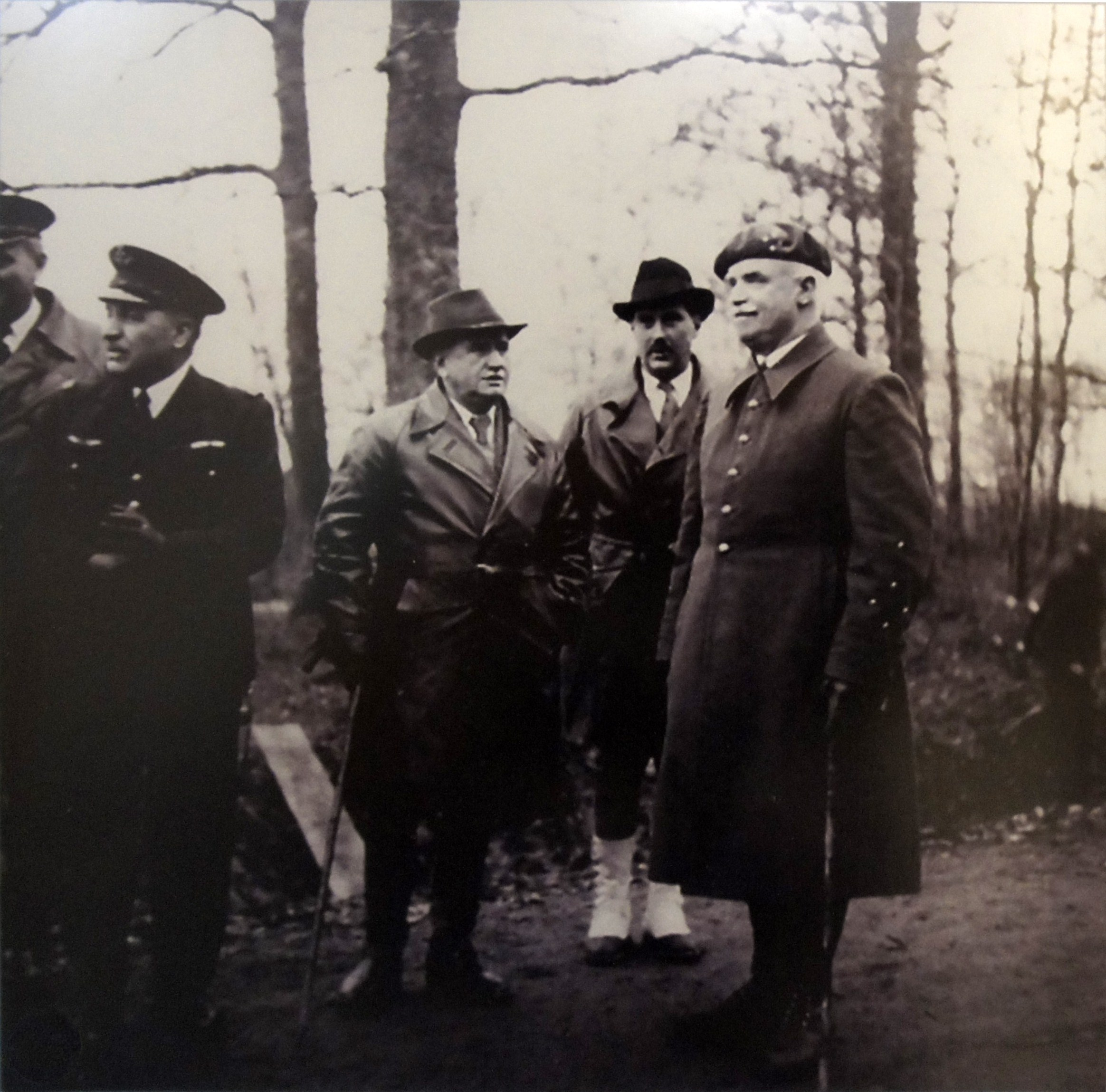
Daladier with generals Joseph Vuillemin and Victor Bourret on 12 November 1939

After the Molotov–Ribbentrop Pact was signed, Daladier responded to the public outcry by outlawing the French Communist Party on the basis that it had refused to condemn Joseph Stalin's actions. During the Danzig Crisis, Daladier was greatly influenced by the advice that he received from Robert Coulondre, the French ambassador in Berlin, that Hitler would back down if France made a firm enough stand toward Poland. On 31 August 1939, Daladier read out to the French cabinet a letter he received from Coulondre: "The trial of strength turns to our advantage. It is only necessary to hold, hold, hold!"

After the German invasion of Poland on 1 September, he reluctantly declared war on 3 September and inaugurated the Phoney War. On 6 October, Hitler offered France and Britain a peace proposal. There were more than a few in the French government who were prepared to take Hitler up on his offer, but in a nationwide broadcast the next day, Daladier declared, "We took up arms against aggression. We shall not put them down until we have guarantees for a real peace and security, a security which is not threatened every six months". On 29 January 1940, in a radio address delivered to the people of France, The Nazi's Aim is Slavery, Daladier explicitly stated his opinion of the Germans: "For us, there is more to do than merely win the war. We shall win it, but we must also win a victory far greater than that of arms. In this world of masters and slaves, which those madmen who rule at Berlin are seeking to forge, we must also save liberty and human dignity".

In March 1940, Daladier resigned as prime minister because of his failure to aid Finland's defence during the Winter War, and he was replaced by Paul Reynaud. Daladier remained defence minister, however, and his antipathy to the new prime minister prevented Reynaud from dismissing Maurice Gamelin as Supreme Commander of the French armed forces. As a result of the massive German breakthrough at Sedan, Daladier swapped ministerial offices with Reynaud and became foreign minister while Reynaud became defence minister. Gamelin was finally replaced by Maxime Weygand on 19 May 1940, nine days after the Germans began the Battle of France.

Under the impression that the French government would continue in North Africa, Daladier fled with other members of the government to French Morocco, but he was arrested and tried for treason by the Vichy government during the Riom Trial.

Daladier was interned in Fort du Portalet, in the Pyrenees. He was kept in prison from 1940 to April 1943, when he was handed over to the Germans and deported to Buchenwald concentration camp in Germany. In May 1943, he was transported to the Itter Castle, in North Tyrol, with other French dignitaries, where he remained until the end of the war. He was freed after the Battle for Castle Itter.

== Postwar ==
After the war ended, Daladier was re-elected to the Chamber of Deputies in 1946 and acted as a patron to the Radical-Socialist Party's young reforming leader, Pierre Mendès-France. He also was elected as the Mayor of Avignon in 1953. He opposed the transferral of powers to Charles de Gaulle after the May 1958 crisis but, in the subsequent legislative elections of that year, failed to secure re-election. He withdrew from politics after a career of almost 50 years at the age of 74.

== Death ==
Daladier died in Paris on 10 October 1970, at the age of 86. He was buried at the Père Lachaise Cemetery in Paris.

== Legacy ==
The Canadian historian Robert Young wrote that Daladier's historical reputation has been tainted by his association with appeasement with his image being of a "weary Sancho Panza to Chamberlain's Don Quixote", namely of a weak, cowardly man who signed the Munich Agreement out of personal weakness rather than conviction, which has made his historical reputation even worse than that of Chamberlain. Young further noted that though Daladier was no longer premier in May–June 1940, the popular image of the French defeat of 1940 is that of an effortless German triumph with the French hardly fighting at all in defence of their nation, which in turn has been linked to appeasement as the popular image of the appeasers is of cowardly, wimpy men unable to stand to Hitler. Young wrote that in the English-speaking world, a key difference in the historical writing about the origins of the Second World War is that British appeasers such as Chamberlain are seen as individuals with their support for appeasement being explained by their own personalities while the support of French appeasers such as Daladier for appeasement is explained by them being French with the clear implication that cowardice is the principal national characteristic of all French people. Young argued that the popular image in the English-speaking world of the French not fighting at all in defence of France in 1940 is not true as about 120,000 French servicemen were killed in action between 10 May-21 June 1940. Young has argued that the picture of Daladier as a key figure in a process of inexorable national decline that ended in France's defeat in 1940 is too teleological and deterministic and failed to address Daladier's efforts at increased rearmament and his attempts to forge an alliance with Great Britain against Germany. Young has further maintained too much of the historical writing on Daladier is more concerned about making sweeping generalisations about the French with the implied message that English-speaking peoples such as the British and the Americans are more courageous and honourable, which he deplored as nationalistic history-writing that prevented the historical understanding of what happened in France and why.

== In visual media ==
- Daladier is portrayed by the English actor David Swift in Countdown to War (1989) and by French actor Stéphane Boucher in Munich – The Edge of War (2021).
- The Czech comedy Lost in Munich (2015) is about a 90-year-old parrot who used to live with Daladier and is still repeating his quotes related to the Munich Agreement

== Daladier's first ministry, 31 January – 26 October 1933 ==
- Édouard Daladier – President of the Council and Minister of War
- Eugène Penancier – Vice President of the Council and Minister of Justice
- Joseph Paul-Boncour – Minister of Foreign Affairs
- Camille Chautemps – Minister of the Interior
- Georges Bonnet – Minister of Finance
- Lucien Lamoureux – Minister of Budget
- François Albert – Minister of Labour and Social Security Provisions
- Georges Leygues – Minister of Marine
- Eugène Frot – Minister of Merchant Marine
- Pierre Cot – Minister of Air
- Anatole de Monzie – Minister of National Education
- Edmond Miellet – Minister of Pensions
- Henri Queuille – Minister of Agriculture
- Albert Sarraut – Minister of Colonies
- Joseph Paganon – Minister of Public Works
- Charles Daniélou – Minister of Public Health
- Laurent Eynac – Minister of Posts, Telegraphs, and Telephones
- Louis Serre – Minister of Commerce and Industry

Changes

- 6 September 1933 – Albert Sarraut succeeds Leygues (d. 2 September) as Minister of Marine. Albert Dalimier succeeds Sarraut as Minister of Colonies.

== Daladier's second ministry, 30 January – 9 February 1934 ==
- Édouard Daladier – President of the Council and Minister of Foreign Affairs
- Eugène Penancier – Vice President of the Council and Minister of Justice
- Jean Fabry – Minister of National Defence and War
- Eugène Frot – Minister of the Interior
- François Piétri – Minister of Finance
- Jean Valadier – Minister of Labour and Social Security Provisions
- Louis de Chappedelaine – Minister of Military Marine
- Guy La Chambre – Minister of Merchant Marine
- Pierre Cot – Minister of Air
- Aimé Berthod – Minister of National Education
- Hippolyte Ducos – Minister of Pensions
- Henri Queuille – Minister of Agriculture
- Henry de Jouvenel – Minister of Overseas France
- Joseph Paganon – Minister of Public Works
- Émile Lisbonne – Minister of Public Health
- Paul Bernier – Minister of Posts, Telegraphs, and Telephones
- Jean Mistler – Minister of Commerce and Industry

Changes

- 4 February 1934 – Joseph Paul-Boncour succeeds Fabry as Minister of National Defence and War. Paul Marchandeau succeeds Piétri as Minister of Finance.

== Daladier's third ministry, 10 April 1938 – 21 March 1940 ==
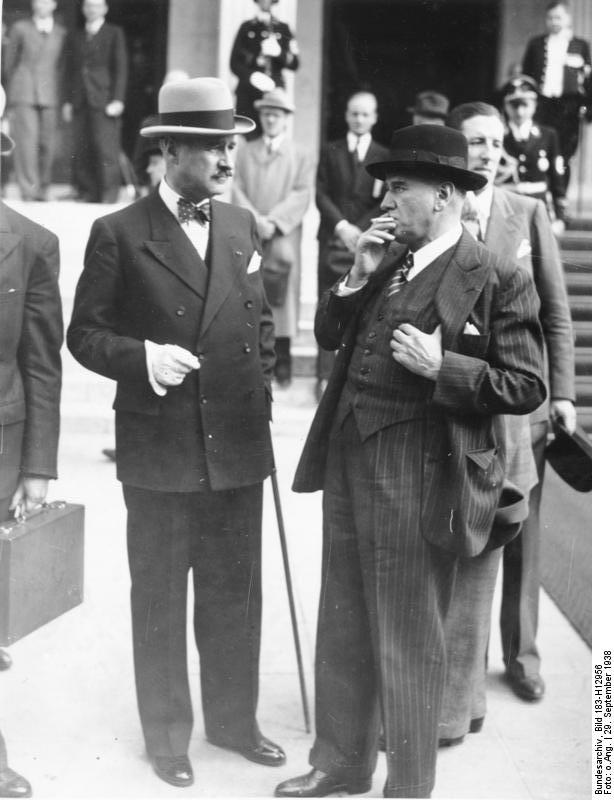
Édouard Daladier (right) with ambassador André François-Poncet at the Munich Agreement 1938

- Édouard Daladier – President of the Council and Minister of National Defence and War
- Camille Chautemps – Vice President of the Council in charge of coordination of the Office of the Presidency of the Council
- Georges Bonnet – Minister of Foreign Affairs
- Albert Sarraut – Minister of the Interior
- Paul Marchandeau – Minister of Finance
- Raymond Patenôtre – Minister of National Economy
- Paul Ramadier – Minister of Labour
- Paul Reynaud – Minister of Justice
- César Campinchi – Minister of Military Marine
- Louis de Chappedelaine – Minister of Merchant Marine
- Guy La Chambre – Minister of Air
- Jean Zay – Minister of National Education
- Auguste Champetier de Ribes – Minister of Veterans and Pensioners
- Henri Queuille – Minister of Agriculture
- Georges Mandel – Minister of Colonies
- Ludovic-Oscar Frossard – Minister of Public Works
- Marc Rucart – Minister of Public Health
- Alfred Jules-Julien – Minister of Posts, Telegraphs, and Telephones
- Fernand Gentin – Minister of Commerce

Changes

- 23 August 1938 – Charles Pomaret succeeds Ramadier as Minister of Labour. Anatole de Monzie succeeds Frossard as Minister of Public Works.
- 1 November 1938 – Paul Reynaud succeeds Paul Marchandeau as Minister of Finance. Marchandeau succeeds Reynaud as Minister of Justice.
- 29 July 1939 – Jean Giraudoux enters the Cabinet as Minister of Information.
- 13 September 1939 – Georges Bonnet succeeds Marchandeau as Minister of Justice. Daladier succeeds Bonnet as Minister of Foreign Affairs, remaining also Minister of National Defence and War. Raymond Patenôtre leaves the Cabinet and the position of Minister of National Economy is abolished. Alphonse Rio succeeds Chappedelaine as Minister of Merchant Marine. Yvon Delbos succeeds Zay as Minister of National Education. René Besse succeeds Champetier as Minister of Veterans and Pensioners. Raoul Dautry enters the Cabinet as Minister of Armaments. Georges Pernot enters the Cabinet as Minister of Blockade.

== See also ==
- 6 February 1934 crisis
- French Third Republic
- Interwar France

== Sources ==
- Adamthwaite, Anthony (1977). France and the Coming of the Second World War 1936–1939. London: Frank Cass.
- Aulach, Harindar (April 1983). "Britain and the Sudeten Issue, 1938: The Evolution of a Policy". The Journal of Contemporary History. 18 (2): 233–259. doi:10.1177/002200948301800204. JSTOR 260386.
- Cairns, John C. (1998). "Reflections on France, Britain and the Winter War Problem". In Joel Blatt (ed.). The French Defeat of 1940 Reassessments. Providence, Rhode Island: Berghahn Books. pp. 269–295. ISBN 1-57181-109-5.
- Charmley, John (1987). Lord Lloyd and the Decline of the British Empire. London: Weidenfeld and Nicolson. ISBN 0-29779-205-9.
- Imlay, Talbot (1998). "France and the Phoney War, 1939–1940". In Boyce, Robert (ed.). French Foreign and Defence Policy, 1918–1940 The Decline and Fall of A Great Power. London: Routledge. pp. 261–282. ISBN 0-415-15039-6.
- Irvine, William (1998). "Domestic Politics and the Fall of France in 1940". In Joel Blatt (ed.). The French Defeat of 1940 Reassessments. Providence, Rhode Island: Berghahn Books. pp. 85–99. ISBN 1-57181-109-5.
- Jackson, Peter (1998). "Intelligence and the End of Appeasement". In Boyce, Robert (ed.). French Foreign and Defence Policy, 1918–1940 The Decline and Fall of A Great Power. London: Routledge. pp. 234–260. ISBN 0-415-15039-6.
- Lacaze, Yvon (1998). "Daladier, Bonnet and the Decision-Making Process During the Munich Crisis, 1938". In Boyce, Robert (ed.). French Foreign and Defence Policy, 1918–1940 The Decline and Fall of A Great Power. London: Routledge. pp. 215–233. ISBN 0-415-15039-6.
- Maiolo, Joseph (2010). Cry Havoc How the Arms Race Drove the World to War, 1931–1941. New York: Basic Books. ISBN 9780465022670.
- Overy, R. J.; Wheatcroft, Andrew (2009). The Road to War. Vintage Books. ISBN 978-1-84595-130-6.
- Réau, Elisabeth du (1998). "Edouard Daladier: The Conduct of the War and the Beginnings of Defeat". In Joel Blatt (ed.). The French Defeat of 1940 Reassessments. Providence, Rhode Island: Berghahn Books. pp. 100–126. ISBN 1-57181-109-5.
- Rémond, Réné; Bourdin, Janine, eds. (1975). Édouard Daladier, chef de gouvernement (avril 1938–septembre 1939): colloque de la Fondation nationale des sciences politiques. Paris: Presses de la Fondation nationale des sciences politiques.
- Salerno, Reynolds M. (February 1997). "The French Navy and the Appeasement of Italy, 1937-9". English Historical Review. 112 (445): 66–104. doi:10.1093/ehr/CXII.445.66.
- Shirer, William L. (1969). The Collapse of the Third Republic An Inquiry into the Fall of France in 1940. New York, New York: Simon & Schuster.
- Thomas, Martin (1999). "France and the Czechoslovak Crisis". In Lukes, Igor; Goldstein, Erik (eds.). The Munich Crisis 1938 Prelude to World War II. London: Frank Cass. pp. 122–159.
- Sowerine, Charles, France since 1870: Culture, Politics and Society
- Dutton, Paul V., Origins of the French Welfare State: The Struggle for Social Reform in France, 1914–1947
- Young, Robert (2011). "A Very English Channel: Britain and French Appeasement". In Frank McDonough (ed.). The Origins of the Second World War. London: Continuum. pp. 238–261.
- Watt, Donald Cameron (1989). How War Came The Immediate Origins of the Second World War 1938–1939. London: Heinemann.
- Male, George A. (1963). "Education in France" (PDF). Washington, D.C.: U.S. Department of Health, Education, and Welfare.

Political offices
Preceded by Jean Fabry	Minister of Colonies; 1924–1925	Succeeded by Orly André-Hesse
Preceded by Paul Painlevé	Minister of War; 1925	Succeeded by Paul Painlevé
Preceded by Yvon Delbos	Minister of Public Instruction and Fine Arts; 1925–1926	Succeeded by Lucien Lamoureux
Preceded by Bertrand Nogaro	Minister of Public Instruction and Fine Arts; 1926	Succeeded by Édouard Herriot
Preceded by Georges Pernot	Minister of Public Works; 1930	Succeeded by Georges Pernot
Preceded by Georges Pernot	Minister of Public Works; 1930–1931	Succeeded by Maurice Deligne
Preceded by Charles Guernier	Minister of Public Works; 1932	Succeeded by Georges Bonnet
Preceded by Joseph Paul-Boncour	Minister of War; 1932–1934	Succeeded by Jean Fabry
Preceded by Joseph Paul-Boncour	President of the Council; 1933	Succeeded by Albert Sarraut
Preceded by Camille Chautemps	President of the Council; 1934	Succeeded by Gaston Doumergue
Preceded by Joseph Paul-Boncour	Minister of Foreign Affairs; 1934	Succeeded by Louis Barthou
Preceded by —	Vice President of the Council; 1936–1937	Succeeded by Léon Blum
Preceded by Louis Maurin	Minister of National Defence and War; 1936–1940	Succeeded by Paul Reynaud
Preceded by Léon Blum	Vice President of the Council; 1938	Succeeded by Camille Chautemps
Preceded by Léon Blum	President of the Council; 1938–1940	Succeeded by Paul Reynaud
Preceded by Georges Bonnet	Minister of Foreign Affairs; 1939–1940	Succeeded by Paul Reynaud
Preceded by Paul Reynaud	Minister of Foreign Affairs; 1940	Succeeded by Paul Reynaud
