= Republican and Social Action =

The Republican and Social Action (French: Action républicaine et sociale, pronounced [aksjɔ̃ ʁepyblikɛn e sɔsjal], ARS) was a French parliamentary group in the Chamber of Deputies of France during the French Third Republic between 1919 and 1924 founded by 46 members of the centre-right Democratic Republican Alliance.

== Members ==
- Antoine Blanc
- Georges André-Fribourg
- Paul Reynaud
- Édouard Grinda
- Gaston Le Provost de Launay
- Pierre Taittinger
- Clément Villeneau
- Pierre Voyer
- Pierre Valude
- Marcel Plaisant
- Marc Doussaud
- René Lafarge
- Adolphe Landry
- Auguste Montenot (until 1921)
- Henri Avril
- Joseph Pouzin
- Marcel Gounouilhou
- Joseph Barthélémy
- Georges Calmès
- Joseph Capus
- Élysée Frouin
- Henri Lorin
- Yves Picot
- Joseph Defos du Rau
- Julien Bessonneau
- Jean-Charles Boutton
- Anatole Manceau
- Pierre Forgeot
- Guy de Montjou
- Georges Tixier
- Joseph Faisant
- Charles Tisseyre
- Édouard Bussat
- Jean Fabry
- Édouard Soulier
- Henry Paté
- Jean Erlich
- Charles Bertrand
- Maurice Bokanowski
- Léon Barbé (until 1920)
- Claude Nectoux
- Constant Pilate (until 1921)
- Charles Reibel
- Jean Périnard
- Paul Mercier
- Victor Reymonenq
- Raoul Persil (since 1920)
- Édouard Payen (since 1920)
- Paul Bluysen (since 1920)
- Joseph-Louis Bonnet (since 1921)

== Fourth Republic ==
The name ARS was used by the group formed by 27 Rally of the French People deputies expelled from their party for voting confidence in Antoine Pinay as President of the Council.

== See also ==
- Democratic Republican Alliance
- Sinistrisme
