= Gayssot Act =

1990 French law

The Gayssot Act or Gayssot Law (French: Loi Gayssot [lwa ɡɛso]), enacted on 13 July 1990, makes it an offence in France to question the existence or size of the category of crimes against humanity as defined in the London Charter of 1945, on the basis of which Nazi leaders were convicted by the International Military Tribunal at Nuremberg in 1945–1946 (article 9).

== Provisions ==
Communist member of Parliament Jean-Claude Gayssot proposed the law. It is one of several European laws prohibiting Holocaust denial. Its first article states that "any discrimination founded on membership or non-membership of an ethnic group, a nation, a race or a religion is prohibited." The law also requires the Commission nationale consultative des droits de l'homme (National Consultative Commission on Human Rights), created in 1947, to publish an annual report on relations between ethnicities in France.

== Previous legislation ==
=== Marchandeau Decree (1939) ===
At the request of the International League against Racism and Anti-Semitism, Paul Marchandeau, center-right Justice Minister in the 1938-1939 third and fourth Daladier governments, issued the decree of 21 April 1939 amending the Law on the Freedom of the Press of 29 July 1881 by providing prosecution "when defamation or insult committed against a group of persons, by their origin, race or religion, will have been designed to arouse hatred among citizens or residents" (translated). This decree was repealed by the law of the Vichy collaborationist government of 16 August 1940. The decree came again into force after the Liberation of France in 1944 by an ordinance of 9 August 1944 repealing most of the Vichy legislation.

=== Pleven Law (1972) ===
René Pleven, center-right Justice Minister in the Chaban-Delmas and Messmer governments in 1969–1973, proposed in 1972 a new law against racism, which was unanimously adopted by the National Assembly, the 72-546 1 July 1972 Law pertaining to the fight against racism. This law came as a requisite after France's ratification in 1971 of the International Convention on the Elimination of All Forms of Racial Discrimination. It differed considerably from the 1939 decree, which permitted only the prosecutor's office to initiate a procedure, whereas the 1972 law allowed any representative organization to initiate a legal procedure.

== Legal challenges ==
After Robert Faurisson was removed from his university chair under the Gayssot Act, he challenged it as a violation of his right to freedom of expression under the International Covenant on Civil and Political Rights (ICCPR). The United Nations Human Rights Committee upheld the condemnation of Faurisson, but mentioned that the Gayssot Act may be too broad.

== See also ==
- Expulsion of Romani people from France
- Historical negationism
- Laws against Holocaust denial
