= Tourancheau and July vs. France =

European Court of Human Rights case

Submitted December 20, 1999 Decided November 24, 2005
- Full case name: Case of Tourancheau and July v. France
- Case: 53886/00
- Language of proceedings: French
- Nationality of parties: France
- President; MM.C.L. Rozakis
- Judges: L. Loucaides; J.P. Costa; Ms. F. Tulkens; Mr. P. Lorenzen; MsN. Vajic; S. Botoucharova

Legislation affecting
- Article 10(2), Law and Freedom Act of 1881

Tourancheau and July v. France is a free speech case that was brought to the European Court of Human Rights. Patricia Tourancheau, a journalist, and Serge July, the editor of the French newspaper Libération were prosecuted, convicted and fined 10,000 Francs each for violating a statute of 1881, the Law on the Freedom of the Press of 29 July 1881, which prohibits the publication of any documents concerned with criminal or correctional proceedings prior to their reading in a public audience. Tourancheau and July adamantly claimed that the law, particularly Article 38, was in direct dispute with Article 10 of the European Convention on Human Rights. Once the case reached the European Court of Human Rights after appealing the French Supreme Court decision, which upheld Tourancheau and July's prosecution, the European Court of Human Rights found that the ruling did not violate Article 10 of the European Convention of Human Rights.

== Libération Article ==
The article at hand, “Amour d’ados planté d’un coup de couteau”, which translates roughly to “Love of teenagers planted with a knife”, was published on October 28, 1996, in the French publication Libération, and discusses the murder case of Marléne Volbrecht from the account of one of the defendants, Benoît Le Gall. It was published while the murder case was still open and awaiting a ruling. Benoît claimed he did not kill Marléne with a knife on May 5, and instead, that his jealous girlfriend, Aurélia, walked up to Marléne and murdered her with a knife.

According to Benoît's account of the happenings on May 5, Benoît and Aurélia had been dating for years, however, took a break at some point where he went and dated Marléne. In some accounts, Aurélia claims that Benoît cheated on her with Marléne, and in other accounts by Benoît, such as the Libération article, he claims him and Aurélia were on a break; none of which this fact is specifically clear nor known.

Eventually finding his way back to Aurelia, but not necessarily cutting ties with Marléne, Marléne did not understand whether Benoît and she were together or not. She proceeded to call him several times at which point Aurélia noticed another girl calling Benoît, her boyfriend. Benoît claimed in the article that Aurelia became “very jealous” as well as possessive, and that she does not want Benoît going to Paris at all, as Marléne was in Paris. Eventually, Aurelia had a change of heart, and “demanded of Benoît that he ‘definitively break up with Marléne,’” and that she wanted to see what Marléne looked like.

Arriving in Paris, Benoît claims he tried to “save time”, according to the article in Libération. When the time came however, he called Marléne from a pay phone and agreed to meet her on the banks of the Seine around 10 p.m. They both sat on a bench where he then told Marléne “it’s all over between us.” Benoît claims both then stood up, and he proceeded to wrap his hands around Marléne's face while looking deep into her eyes. “At one point, I hear Marléne shout: "But what is that?" At the same time, she loosens my wrists, pushes me away, brings her hands to her belly. I see the reflection of the blade which I took from her belly and threw to the ground. I picked it up without thinking. When I turned around, I saw Aurélia running away towards the bridge.”.

Tourancheau ended the article talking about how Benoît “nevertheless remains accused of murder”, which was said by the courts to impale the presumption of innocence to Aurélia. On June 10, 1998, the Juvenile Court in Paris declared Aurélia guilty to have deliberately killed Marléne and sentenced her to eight years in prison. Benoît was declared guilty of voluntarily refraining from assisting Marléne and the court sentenced him to five years imprisonment.

== Tourancheau and July v. France ==
The Law on the Freedom of the Press of 29 July 1881 applies to all procedural acts that are police reports, testimony of witnesses, expert reports, or summons. Tourancheau and July directly violates specifically Article 38, paragraph 1, of the 1881 act. Article 38, paragraph 1, states “it is forbidden to publish indictments and any other criminal or correctional proceedings before they have been read in open court, under the penalty of the fine provided for contraventions of the 40th class.”

The case was brought before the Tribunal de Grande Instance by a Paris Court of First Instance prosecutor against Tourancheau and July on the 10th and 15th of April in 1997. Both defendants did not dispute this accusation. However, Tourancheau claimed that she had never had actual documents that were in the current investigation file, at the time of the investigation of Benoít and Aurélia; everything she had were just statements by Benoît. Tourancheau and July both claimed that the prohibition laid down in Article 38 (1) of the Act of 29 July 1881, did not constitute a “necessary measure in a democratic society” that is said in Article 10(2) of the European Convention of Human Rights. Further, Tourancheau and July were disputing the claims about Article 38 against them because they found that Article 38 was in direct conflict with the European Court of Human Rights Article 10(2), talking about free speech and freedom of the press.

On December 19, 1997, the Paris Criminal Court ruled that section 38(1) of the 1881 Act did not appear contrary to the requirements of the Convention.

Touranchaeu and July appealed this ruling on December 23, 1997. Again, their argument stayed the same, claiming Article 38 (1) of the Act of 1881 was incompatible with Article 10(2)of the Convention. It was decided on June 24, 1998, by the Correctional Appeal Chamber of the Paris Court of Appeals that Article 38 “can not in itself be regarded as incompatible with the principle laid down in Article 10(2)of the Convention.”) Furthermore, the ruling stated that publishing indictments and all acts of criminal or correctional procedure before they have been read in open court is necessary in a democratic society, which is specifically discussed in Article 10(2)of the Convention. Specifically, the reputation of others and the guarantee of the authority an impartiality of the judiciary are being targeted here as being upheld in the ruling. The Court of Appeals of France upheld the verdict on the conviction but reversed the sentence, ordering the applicants to pay a suspended fine of 10,000 Francs, respectively.

== The Convention ==
Upon the appeal to the European Court of Human Rights, the defendants, Touranchea and July, had several clear arguments against their rulings in France:

(1) The applicants considered that their conviction for publication of criminal proceedings before their reading in open court undoubtedly constituted an interference with their right to freedom of expression.

(2) Article 38 of the Freedom of the Press Act is imprecise and obsolete. It is not sufficiently clear nor precise and not compatible with the requirements of the Convention, namely Article 10(2).

(3) Section 38 of the 1881 Act is notoriously fallen into disuse since no case law directly applying it has been recorded for a long period. The last time the law was used was 1926, which is less than recent to 1996, therefore, as the defendants argued, made the law extremely out of date.

(4) Tourancheau and July believed that Article 38 of the Act of 1881 does not seek to protect one of the interests listed in Article 10(2). They argued that no complaint had been filed by Aurélia, whose rights have been ‘apparently’ challenged according to the previous rulings of the French Judiciary. Additionally, the applicants claimed that prohibiting the press from mentioning criminal proceedings is not possible in a democratic society and does not correspond in any way to current practice in France.

== Convention Ruling ==
The conviction was found to clearly interfere and infringe on the defendant's, Tourancheau and July, exercise of their right to freedom of expression. What needed to be decided was if these infringements satisfied the requirements of Article 10(2). The Convention court found just as the national court found, that the article “undeniably” shows that it tend to support the version of Benoît, which could be detrimental to Aurélia. Further, the article suggests Aurélia is guilty and Benoît is innocent. The Convention found that the publication infringed on the presumption of innocence and described how it infringed the rights of third parties, which they subsequently applied Article 38(1) of the Act of 1881.

As for communicating knowledge to the public, the Convention considered that Tourancheau and July's interest in communicating to the public, as well as the public's right to receive information about the conduct of criminal proceedings, as well as the guilt of the persons under investigation, while the judicial investigation was not completed. They found that there could be harmful dissemination of the article, again, on the protection of the reputation and rights of Aurélia, including her presumption of innocence and the impartiality of the judiciary.

The Court therefore concluded that the applicants’ conviction constituted an interference with their freedom of expression, to protect the reputation and rights of the others and to guarantee the authority and impartiality of the judiciary within the meaning of Article 10(2) of the Convention, ultimately declaring that there had been no violation of Article 10(2), upholding the prior decisions.

== Dissenting Judges ==
The joint dissenting opinion of Judges J.P. Costa, F. Tulkens, and P. Lorenzen stated, obviously, that they did not agree with the majority that the applicants’ conviction constituted an interference with their freedom of expression “necessary in a democratic society”. “Freedom of expression is one of the essential foundations of a democratic society ad it is settled case-law that the necessity for any restriction in the exercise of this freedom must meet a pressing social need.” They included their belief that the public has a legitimate interest in being informed and to be informed about the criminal trials and particularly of the facts related to the dramatic case of these young people's love. All three judges said that journalists have the right to be free to report on the functioning of the criminal justice system. They believe that they told Benoît's story in good faith and in accordance with journalistic ethics. And while the article tends to support the version of the facts of one of the accused, it did not infringe on the presumption of innocence of Aurélia, whom more importantly, never complained of the article. Additionally, the hearings for the two took place about 20 months after the publishing of the article. “It can thus be considered that, at the time of the trial, its impact had been greatly diminished.” In conclusion, even if the reasons given by the Government and domestic courts are relevant. These judges believed that they were not sufficient to show that the interference was “necessary in a democratic society”. Furthermore, they believe there is no reasonable relationship of proportionality between the restrictions imposed on the applicants’ freedom of expression, and the legitimate aim pursued, concluding that there had been a violation by the French domestic courts, of the Convention's Article 10.

== See also ==
CASE OF BÉDAT v. SWITZERLAND

CASE OF STOLL v. SWITZERLAND

CASE OF CENTRO EUROPA 7 S.R.L. AND DI STEFANO v. ITALY

CASE OF AXEL SPRINGER AG v. GERMANY

AFFAIRE PINTO COELHO c. PORTUGAL

CASE OF DUPUIS AND OTHERS v. FRANCE

AFFAIRE BARATA MONTEIRO DA COSTA NOGUEIRA ET PATRICIO PEREIRA c. PORTUGAL

AFFAIRE CAMPOS DAMASO c. PORTUGAL

AFFAIRE YOSLUN c. TURQUIE

AFFAIRE GUTIERREZ SUAREZ c. ESPAGNE

AFFAIRE ŠTEFANEC c. REPUBLIQUE TCHEQUE

AFFAIRE A.B. c. SUISSE

AFFAIRE BRUNET-LECOMTE ET SARL LYON MAG' c. FRANCE
