= Louis Maurin =

Louis Félix Thomas Maurin
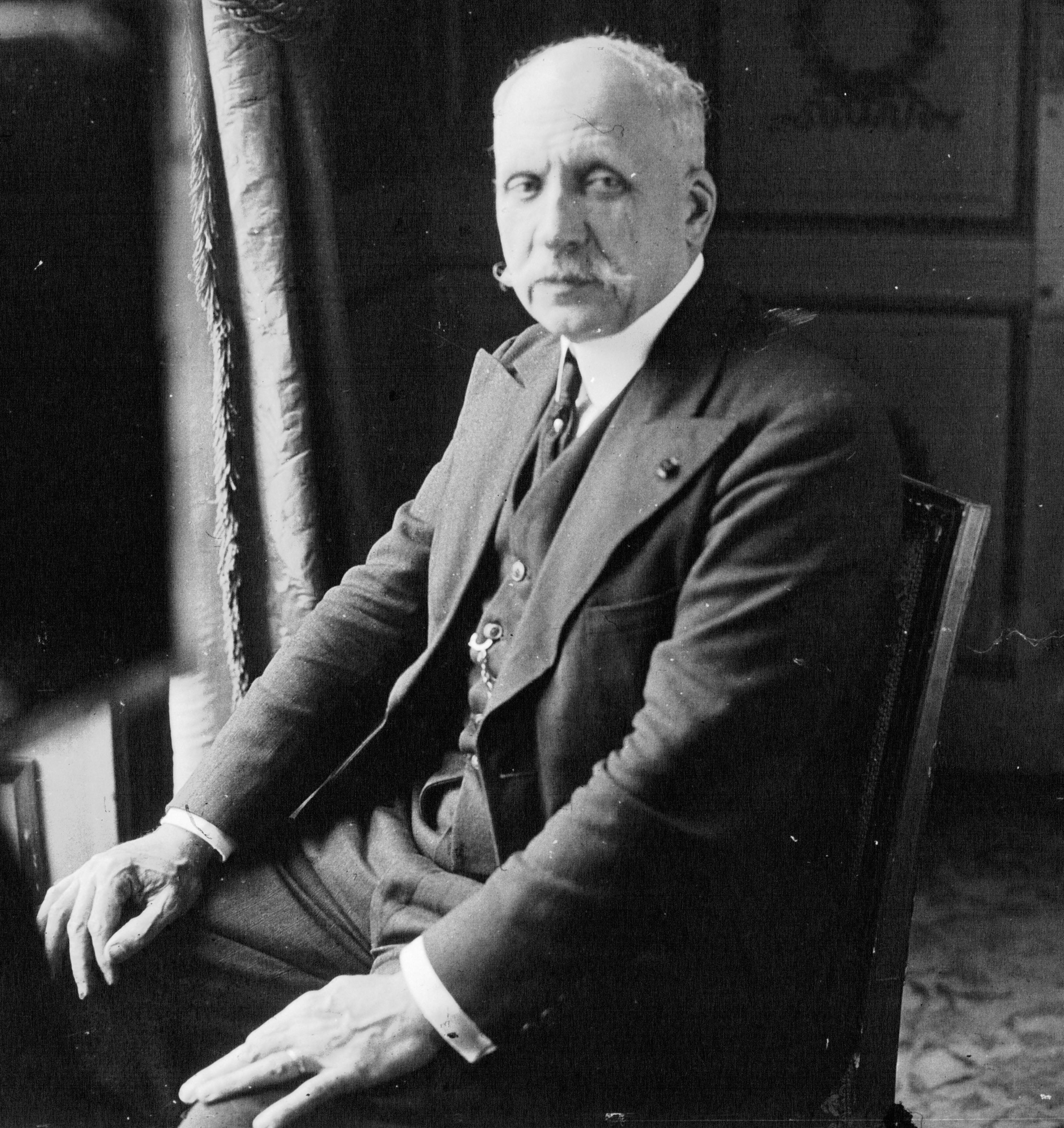
- Maurin in 1934

Minister of War of France
- In office 24 January 1936 – 4 June 1936
- President: Albert Lebrun
- Prime Minister: Pierre-Étienne Flandin; Fernand Bouisson
- Preceded by: Jean Fabry
- Succeeded by: Édouard Daladier
- In office 8 November 1934 – 7 June 1935
- President: Albert Lebrun
- Prime Minister: Albert Sarraut
- Preceded by: Philippe Pétain
- Succeeded by: Jean Fabry

Personal details
- Born: 5 January 1869 Cherbourg, France
- Died: 6 June 1956 (aged 87) Paris. France
- Occupation: General

Louis Félix Thomas Maurin (French: [lwi feliks tɔma moʁɛ̃]; 5 January 1869 – 6 June 1956) was a French army general who was twice Minister of War in the 1930s. Before and during World War I (1914–18) he was a strong advocate of motorization. In the inter-war period from 1919 to 1939 he advocated a policy of passive defense against the growing German threat. He thought that with all the money that had been spent on the Maginot Line fortifications it would be madness to go on the offensive. He saw little value in tanks as a weapon. He advised against a limited military reaction when Germany reoccupied the Rhineland in March 1936, calling for general mobilization or nothing. He did not consider that the 1936 pact with Russia would help France militarily.

== Early years ==
Louis Félix Thomas Maurin was born in Cherbourg on 5 January 1869. He graduated from the École Polytechnique and joined the army, where he made his career in the artillery. In 1899 Maurin and Maurice Gamelin were fellow students at the École de Guerre. Maurin married Anne-Marie Bigault. Their son, Philippe Maurin (born 13 December 1913), would become an Air Force general.

Maurin was involved in motorization for almost twenty years. He was described by one general as "an apostle of motorization." During World War I (1914–18) both Maurin and Gamelin were "special envoys" of Joseph Joffre in 1914. Maurin later served on the staff of General Joseph Gallieni. He was appointed Brigadier General in 1918. In 1918 Maurin was in command of the General Reserve of Artillery. Motor transport was widely used by the Reserve to move artillery units between sectors of front.

== Post-war army ==
Maurin became second in command of the French Army general staff in 1920. Maurin was Inspector General of Artillery from 1922 to 1934. From 1927 he was also Inspector General for Motorization of the Army. In October 1927 Maurin and two other officers advocated that the planned Maginot Line of defenses include a double line of machine gun placements. He was overruled in favor of the palm fort design, which was supported by Philippe Pétain.

Maurin represented France in Poland at the tenth anniversary of Polish independence, and presented a Consular saber to Chief of State Józef Piłsudski. When General Marie-Eugène Debeney retired as Chief of Staff in 1928, Maurin and Maxime Weygand were proposed as replacements. Pétain objected to Maurin, while the Minister of War Paul Painlevé objected to Weygand. Eventually Weygand was given the post in 1930.

== Minister of War ==
Maurin was Minister of War from November 1934 to June 1935. He said in a debate in March 1934 that in the event of war France would not go on the offensive after having spent billions on fortifications. It would be insane to risk an advance in front of that barrier. He became a member of the Conseil supérieur de la guerre (Supreme War Council) in 1935. Maurin wrote that in April 1935, a month after Germany had reestablished a conscript army in violation of the Treaty of Versailles,

Germany had hitherto been surrounded by a wall of paper; within that wall she had grown and had provided herself with formidable military means ... It was impossible to foretell with any accuracy in what direction the armed forces of Germany would move once the wall of paper was completely torn down.

In January 1936 Maurin was appointed Minister of War in the cabinet of Albert Sarraut. The Minister of Foreign Affairs, Pierre-Étienne Flandin, wanted to obtain agreement from Britain for support in the event of a military confrontation with Germany, but Maurin refused to provide details of the action France proposed to take. The British Foreign Secretary, Anthony Eden, took the lack of firm commitments as evidence that France was looking for an excuse to avoid using force against Germany. When the Franco-Soviet Treaty of Mutual Assistance was ratified in February 1936 Maurin told the Council of Ministers that the alliance would have no military value to France.

With the growing threat of German reoccupation of the demilitarized Rhineland, on 17 February 1936 Maurin wrote, "It could be contrary to French interests to use our right to occupy the demilitarized zone... We would actually risk being considered the aggressor and thus finding ourselves alone facing Germany. Such an operation could not be considered without the full support of the British government." After the remilitarization of the Rhineland by German forces on 7 March 1936 Maurin said at the cabinet meeting late that morning that a partial, temporary demonstration of force would be ineffectual. (Note: When advising against a limited military move Maurin did not have access to intelligence from the Deuxième Bureau that the German forces were much weaker than Hitler claimed.) He called for general mobilization of French forces, and said the government should considered declaring war, if possible with British support. Maurin noted that if the government raised a million men but Hitler refused to back down, the government would be ridiculed if it simply demobilized the men. According to Flandin, "That request elicited loud protests from the cabinet. A general mobilization six weeks before elections was insane." The government decided to take no action.

General Gamelin later said it was "intolerable that people are saying that the military did not want to move on March 7." He asked Maurin to ensure that "in future political and military matters be submitted to the Haut Comité Militaire for discussion before being taken up by the Cabinet." After the German move the French and British held military discussions, which proved pointless. The French asserted that they could defend their border with Germany alone. Maurin said the British should "understand that we can hold out alone if need be." In 1936 Maurin supported General Gamelin and told the Cabinet it was inconceivable that France could reverse German remilitarization without full mobilization.

== Later career ==
Maurin despised General Charles de Gaulle, and in 1937 banished him to command of the 507th Tank Regiment. He said to de Gaulle, "You have caused us enough trouble with the tank on paper. Now let's see what you can make of the real thing! ... Good bye de Gaulle! Wherever I am there will be no room for you." In March 1938 Maurin wrote in an article that the Army was a "marvelous instrument, perfectly disciplined." However, during the crisis of the summer of 1938, when Adolf Hitler was threatening war with Czechoslovakia, Louis Maurin told Pierre Flandin that the French army was organized only for defense and could not undertake even a very limited military intervention.

Louis Maurin died in Paris on 6 June 1956.

== Publications ==
Maurin's publications included:

- Maurin, Louis, ed. (1917), Centre d'études d'artillerie. [Conférence...] La R.G.A.L. [Réserve générale d'artillerie lourde] par le Gal [Louis-Félix-Thomas] Maurin. (in French), Centre d'études d'artillerie, p. 14
- Maurin, Louis (15 February 1929), Rapport sur la manoeuvre de Mailly. 7-13 août 1928. Approuvé par le Maréchal de France, vice-président du Conseil supérieur de la guerre. (in French), Paris: Conseil supérieur de la guerre
- Maurin, Louis (5 September 1934), preface, Le huitième rallye des carburants nationaux, by Pignot, André (in French), Paris: Journal des usines à gaz, p. 16
- Maurin, Louis (12 October 1938), Général Maurin. L'Armée moderne (in French), Paris: impr. Jouve; E. Flammarion, p. 270
- Maurin, Louis (1948), Commission consultative des dommages et des réparations. Ingérences allemandes dans l'activité industrielle. Monographie A.I. 43. Construction navale (in French), Aubé, Pierre, preface, Paris: France. Commission consultative des dommages et des réparations, p. 23

== Sources ==
- Alexander, M.; Philpott, W. (2002-10-22), Anglo-French Defence Relations Between the Wars, Palgrave Macmillan UK, ISBN 978-0-230-55448-1
- Bankwitz, Philip Charles Farwell (1967), Maxime Weygand and Civil-military Relations in Modern France, Harvard University Press, ISBN 978-0-674-55701-7
- Cairns, John C. (1984), "Planning for la guerre des masses: Constraints and Contradictions in France Before 1940", Military planning in the twentieth century : proceedings of the Eleventh Military History Symposium 10-12 October 1984, DIANE Publishing, ISBN 978-1-4289-9343-3
- Duroselle, Jean-Baptiste (2013-10-18), France and the Nazi Threat: The Collapse of French Diplomacy 1932-1939, Enigma Books, ISBN 978-1-936274-81-9
- Gudmundsson, Bruce I. (2004), On Armor, Greenwood Publishing Group, ISBN 978-0-275-95020-0
- Haskew, Michael E. (2015-11-02), Tank: 100 Years of the World's Most Important Armored Military Vehicle, Voyageur Press, ISBN 978-0-7603-4963-2
- Kaufmann, J. E.; Kaufmann, H. W. (2007-11-16), Fortress France: The Maginot Line and French Defenses in World War II, Stackpole Books, ISBN 978-0-8117-3395-3
- "Louis Maurin", BnF (in French)
- Paxton, Robert O. (2015-12-08), Parades and Politics at Vichy, Princeton University Press, ISBN 978-1-4008-7839-0
- "Philippe Maurin", Who's Who in France (in French)
- Schultz, Kenneth A. (2001-07-26), Democracy and Coercive Diplomacy, Cambridge University Press, ISBN 978-0-521-79669-9
- Vanwelkenhuyzen, Jean (2007), Le gâchis des années 30: 1933-1937 (in French), Lannoo Uitgeverij, ISBN 978-2-87386-408-8
- Wandycz, Piotr Stefan (2014-07-14), The Twilight of French Eastern Alliances, 1926-1936: French-Czechoslovak-Polish Relations from Locarno to the Remilitarization of the Rhineland, Princeton University Press, ISBN 978-1-4008-5981-8
- Young, Robert J. (1978), In Command of France; French Foreign Policy and Military Planning, 1933–1940, Cambridge: Harvard University Press, ISBN 0-674-44536-8
