= Georges Pernot =

French lawyer and politician

Auguste Alain Georges Pernot
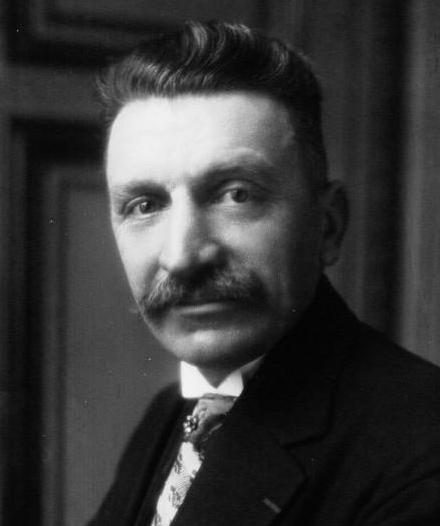
- Pernot in 1930

Minister of Public Works
- In office 3 November 1929 – 13 December 1930
- Prime Minister: André Tardieu
- Preceded by: Pierre Forgeot
- Succeeded by: Édouard Daladier

Minister of Justice
- In office 8 November 1934 – 7 June 1935
- Prime Minister: Pierre-Étienne Flandin; Fernand Bouisson
- Preceded by: Henry Lémery
- Succeeded by: Léon Bérard

Minister of Blockade
- In office 13 September 1939 – 21 March 1940
- Prime Minister: Édouard Daladier
- Succeeded by: Georges Monnet

Minister of the French Family and Public Health
- In office 6 June 1940 – 16 June 1940
- Prime Minister: Paul Reynaud
- Preceded by: Marcel Héraud
- Succeeded by: Jean Ybarnégaray

Personal details
- Born: 6 November 1879 Besançon, Doubs, France
- Died: 14 September 1962 (aged 82) Besançon, Doubs, France
- Occupation: Lawyer

Auguste Alain Georges Pernot (French: [oɡyst alɛ̃ ʒɔʁʒ pɛʁno]; 6 November 1879 – 14 September 1962) was a conservative French lawyer and politician. He was a deputy and then a senator before and during World War II (1939–45). He was Minister of Public Works in 1929–30, Minister of Justice in 1934–35, Minister of Blockade in 1939–40 and briefly Minister of the French Family and Public Health in June 1940. After World War II (1939–45) he was again a senator from 1946 to 1959. Throughout his career Pernot was a vocal pronatalist, pushing for government policies that would support the family and encourage higher birth rates to counter the demographic crisis in France. He believed that women should be encouraged to remain at home to raise children.

== Early years ==
Auguste Alain Georges Pernot was born on 6 November 1879 in Besançon, Doubs. His father was a barrister at the court of Besançon. He was one of eight children, and would himself have seven children. He inherited conservative Catholic views, but was loyal to the Republic. His early education was at the Frères de Marie in Besançon. In 1904 he submitted a legal thesis on the rights to the salary of the married woman.

Georges Pernot became an advocate at the Besançon court of appeal. In 1905, the year in which the separation of the church and state came into force, he fought for the clerical cause. He enlisted in the territorial army in 1914 at the start of World War I (1914–18). He volunteered for the front, was wounded, received three citations, rose to the rank of captain and was decorated with the Legion of Honor.

Pernot was elected a municipal councilor in Besançon in 1919. Throughout his political career Pernot was interested in family rights. In 1921 he founded the Union of Large Families of Doubs, one of the first branches of the Federation of Associations of Large Families (Fédération des Associations des Familles Nombreuses), created in September 1921.

== Deputy ==
Pernot was elected deputy for Doubs in 1924. He led the left wing of the National Catholic Federation (Fédération nationale catholique, FNC). As a Social Catholic he pushed for social reforms. By 1926 there was support for pacification, in which the Catholics would stop trying to capture the state and in exchange would be allowed to teach. In 1927 he criticized the right wing members of the FNC "whose intransigence had harmed them in the past, and who were depriving themselves once again of the influence that they ought to have on the destiny of the country.

Pernot was elected deputy for Pontarlier in 1928. He was also general councilor for Doubs from 1928 for the canton of Morteau. He was vice-president of the chamber of deputies from 1928. He specialized in legal and family issues. In 1930 Pernot became president of the Federation of Large Families. He was Minister of Public Works from 3 November 1929 to 13 December 1930 in the cabinet of André Tardieu. During his term of office the parliament voted to double the national road network to 40,000 kilometres (25,000 mi).

Pernot was reelected deputy for Pontarlier in 1932. After the 1932 election Pernot and left the National Catholic Federation since he was unwilling to join the same parliamentary group as its right-wing members. In 1932 Pernot was the moving force behind the family allocation bill, which forced all employers to provide family benefits. He represented France twice in the League of Nations. He led the negotiations between France and Germany over the status of the Saar.

Pernot was Minister of Justice from 8 November 1934 to 7 June 1935 in the cabinet of Pierre-Étienne Flandin. On 22 February 1935 Henry Dorgères, a Fascist sympathizer and leader of the "Green Shirt" movement, made an inflammatory speech in Rouen. Pernot, who was already concerned about the movement, made sure that Dorgères was prosecuted for the speech with no delay. In the end, Dorgères was given a suspended sentence of six months in prison on 29 August 1935.

== Senator ==
Pernot was elected senator for Doubs in November 1935 on the first ballot. He criticized the Matignon accord of June 1936, which settled union grievances after the recent general strike, saying it was "an accord between workers and employers reached under government supervision that dealt with everything except family allowances; they thought of everything except the most important!". On 8 January 1938 Pernot gave a speech in the Senate on the demographic crisis. He rejected defeatism and stop-gap responses. He called for the family vote, tax code reform, better housing, priority for members of large families in employment in the public service and creation of an appropriate moral climate. He wanted to stop the movement of people to the cities and encourage women to return to the home. He noted that eight million women held jobs, and argued that if women were paid to stay at home the family would benefit while unemployment would be reduced. He said, "if the government wishes to undertake this policy with courage, it will have behind it the unanimity of Parliament and the unanimity of the country, for all of us share the deep conviction that we will not achieve the health of the nation except by a return to the old virtues of the family."

In February 1938 Pernot talked of the "moral sickness" of France in a speech in which he cited statistics that showed that France's population was falling behind Italy and Germany. He called for a legal document to organize and strengthen the existing laws and regulations, and an official organization to develop and promote these laws. He said, "We must create a policy that will restore this country's faith, soul, ideal, as well as its trust and confidence in the future." The government of Édouard Daladier established the High Committee on the Population (Haut Comité de la Population, HCP) in February 1939. It included Pernot and the pronatalists Fernand Boverat and Adolphe Landry. Its mandate was to prepare reforms to encourage the growth of the population, particularly in rural areas. This led to the Family Code (Code de la Famille), enacted in July 1939, which introduced family allowances in agriculture and reformed family allowances in commerce and industry. It redistributed benefits from small families to larger ones, and gave birth bonuses for children born in the first two years of marriage.

After the outbreak of World War II (1939–45) Pernot was made Minister of Blockade in the war cabinet of Édouard Daladier from 13 September 1939 to 21 March 1940. The ministry was not staffed until October 1939, and the inter-ministerial Blockade Committee was only formed at the end of October. Pernod chaired the committee, which coordinated preventative purchasing efforts abroad. However, he was handicapped by lack of authority over the departments represented on the committee. The blockade was ineffective. In December 1939 Pernot's optimistic forecasts were rejected by the conservative Paul Bastid. Pernod reported in March 1940 that Germany's shipments from overseas had dropped but imports by land had increased, notably from the Soviet Union, the Balkans and Italy. After being replaced as Blockade Minister, in April 1940 Pernot criticized the failure to stimulate the wartime economy, saying "Reports on top of reports, all stuffed with figures, many of which unfortunately provide little comfort. What an effort remains to increase our number of aircraft, to accelerate the production of munitions."

On 5 June 1940 the second cabinet of Paul Reynaud created the Ministry of the Family, with Pernot as minister. He was also Minister of Health. The new Family Ministry was to help families that had been displaced by the war. Pernot held office only until 16 June 1940. On 10 July 1940, he voted in favour of granting the cabinet presided by Marchal Philippe Pétain authority to draw up a new constitution, thereby effectively ending the French Third Republic and establishing Vichy France. In 1941 Pernot was named a member of the National Council. In June 1941 the High Committee on the Population (HCP) was dissolved and the Consultative Committee on the Family (Comité consultatif de la Famille) was created in its place. Pernot, Alfred Sauvy and Jacques Doublet all continued from the HCP to the new committee. The committee established teams to investigate family-related legislation, housing, food rationing, financial assistance, childhood and moral protection. From 1943 to 1945 Pernot was a member of the departmental council of Doubs. He was dismissed from the Senate in 1945.

== Post-war career ==
As soon as France was liberated Pernot began a propaganda drive to address the demographic crisis in France through stronger policies to encourage families. In July 1945 he launched the pronatalist journal Pour la vie (For Life). The first issues of Pour la vie tried to show that pronatalism had arisen in the pre-war period, and that it should be recognized for the Code de la Famille rather than for its collaboration with the Vichy Regime.

Pernot was elected to the Council of the Republic in 1946. At first he was president of the Republican Party of Liberty (Parti républicain de la liberté, PRL). He then joined the Independent Republicans (Républicains indépendants). He remained most active in issues concerning the family and children. He was designated French representative to the committee on social issues of the United Nations Economic Council. He was a member of the Consultative Assembly of the Council of Europe, and chaired the Committee on Population and Refugees of the Council of Europe.

Pernot voted for the draft law on constitutional reform on 2–3 June 1958 that led to the French Fifth Republic. He did not seek reelection in 1959. In July 1959 he was made a commander of the Legion of Honor. He died on 15 September 1962 in Besançon, Doubs, aged 82.

== Publications ==
- Pernot, Georges (1904). Les Droits de la femme mariée sur les produits de son travail. l'auteur. p. 269.
- Pernot, Georges (1938). La Situation démographique de la France et la crise de dénatalité... fédération des associations de familles nombreuses de France. p. 27.
- Manceau, Bernard (1942). Pour la repopulation : Des assurances familiales. Georges Pernot, preface. "L'Argus. p. 60.
- Bernard Amoudru; Paul Chanson; Georges Pernot; Édouard Rolland (1945). Famille et propriété. Paris: Éditions familiales de France. p. 40.
- Georges Pernot (1946). "Un vieil ennemi de la famille, les lois depuis 1789". La Société familiale. Paris: Éditions familiales de France. p. 48.
- Georges Pernot (1971). Journal de guerre 1940-1941. Roger Marlin, preface. Paris: les Belles lettres. p. 236.

== Sources ==
- Atkin, Nicholas; Tallett, Frank (8 November 2003). The Right in France: From Revolution to Le Pen. I.B.Tauris. ISBN 978-1-86064-916-5.
- Dutton, Paul V. (16 May 2002). Origins of the French Welfare State: The Struggle for Social Reform in France, 1914–1947. Cambridge University Press. ISBN 978-1-139-43296-2.
- Imlay, Talbot C. (2003). Facing the Second World War: Strategy, Politics, and Economics in Britain and France, 1938-1940. Oxford University Press. ISBN 978-0-19-926122-2.
- Jolly, Jean (1960–1977). "Georges Pernot". Dictionnaire des parlementaires français (1889-1940) (in French). Vol. VII. Paris: Presses universitaires de France. ISBN 2-1100-1998-0.
- La documentation française (2005). "Auguste Alain Georges Pernot". Dictionnaire des parlementaires français de 1940 à 1958 (in French).
- Nord, Philip (26 August 2012). France's New Deal: From the Thirties to the Postwar Era. Princeton University Press. ISBN 978-1-4008-3496-9.
- Passmore, Kevin (1 January 2013). The Right in France from the Third Republic to Vichy. OUP Oxford. ISBN 978-0-19-965820-6.
- Paxton, Robert O. (26 September 1997). French Peasant Fascism : Henry Dorgeres' Greenshirts and the Crises of French Agriculture, 1929-1939. Oxford University Press, USA. ISBN 978-0-19-535474-4.
- Robcis, Camille (19 April 2013). The Law of Kinship: anthropology, psychoanalysis, and the family in France. Cornell University Press. ISBN 978-0-8014-6839-1.
- Rosental, Paul-André (27 March 2003). Intelligence démographique (L') (in French). Odile Jacob. ISBN 978-2-7381-1258-3.
