= Pierre Forgeot =

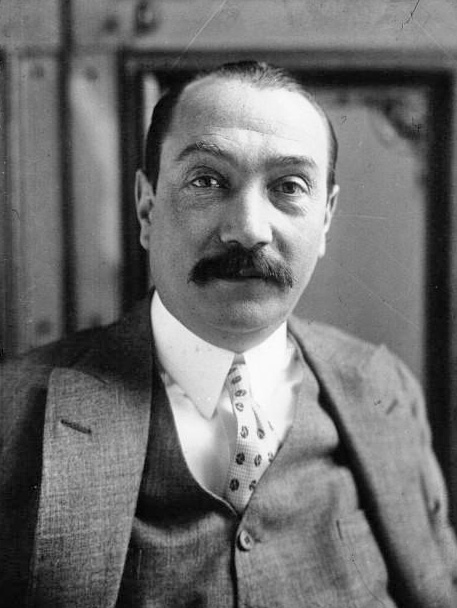
- Pierre Forgeot in 1929

Minister of Public Works
- In office 11 November 1928 – 3 November 1929
- Prime Minister: Raymond Poincaré; Aristide Briand
- Preceded by: André Tardieu
- Succeeded by: Georges Pernot

Personal details
- Born: 10 March 1888 Anglure, Marne, France
- Died: 30 June 1956 (aged 68) Paris, France
- Occupation: Lawyer

Pierre Forgeot (10 March 1888 – 30 June 1956) was a French lawyer, politician and businessman who was involved in issues of war damages during and after World War I (1914–18). He was Minister of Public Works in 1928–29. After leaving politics in 1936, he was administrator of the French arm of Hispano-Suiza, the automobile and armaments manufacturer.

== Early years (1888–1914) ==
Pierre Forgeot was born on 10 March 1888 in Anglure, Marne. His grandfather was a train conductor on the line between Paris and Troyes who settled in Anglure after his marriage to Eugénie Duterme and became a small manufacturer of bonnets. His father, Gustave Forgeot, was a businessman. Gustave was mayor of Anglure from 1898 to 1919 and from 1925 to 1927, councilor of the canton of Anglure from 1895 to 1899 and councilor-general from 1899 to 1927. He owned a vineyard and was a Radical.

Pierre Forgeot studied law in Paris. He was admitted to the bar in 1909, and became secretary to the Conférence des avocats. He obtained his Doctorate in Law in 1911 for a brilliant thesis on Les lapins de garenne devant la loi et la jurisprudence (Cottontail rabbits before the law and jurisprudence).

== Political career (1914–36) ==
In the general elections of 26 April 1914 Forgeot ran on the Federation of the Left platform for the 3rd district of Reims. He won in the second round. He was the second-youngest member of the chamber of deputies. Forgeot was noted for his eloquence in the chamber of deputies. During World War I (1914–18) he was not mobilized, and was involved in issues of requisitions, rents and war damages.

In the elections of 16 November 1919 Forgeot was elected on the platform of the conservative Entente républicaine démocratique. He joined the committees on Finance, Customs and Liberated Regions. When Aristide Briand formed his government in January 1921 Forgeot immediately asked him whether he wanted to fully calculate all damages before presenting a bill for World War I reparations to Germany, which could take some time, or whether he would make an arbitrary but final claim, which would be faster but could be for a lesser amount. Briand avoided giving a straight answer. Forgeot and André Tardieu denounced the London Schedule of Payments of 5 May 1921, but the majority voted to approve it.

Forgeot did not compete in the election of 11 May 1924. After the election of Maurice de Rothschild in the Hautes-Alpes was invalidated he ran in the by-election of 3 October 1925, but was defeated. Forgeot was elected for Épernay on the Republican-Socialist platform in the elections of 22 April 1928. He joined the committees on Commerce & Industry, Liberated Regions, Public Works and Civil & Criminal Law. He was appointed Minister of Public Works in the cabinet of Raymond Poincaré on 11 November 1928. He retained that post in the cabinet of Aristide Briand from 29 July 1929 to 3 November 1929. He was reelected for Épernay in the elections of 1 May 1932. Forgeot left politics in 1936.

== Later career (1936–56) ==
Forgeot became president of the French subsidiary of Hispano-Suiza. After the outbreak of the Spanish Civil War in July 1936 he arranged for the Mateu family, owners of the Spanish parent, to move to France. From there Miquel Mateu went to Burgos to report to General Francisco Franco. Under the law of 1936 the French subsidiary of Hispano-Suiza was obliged to concentrate on making war material for the French forces. The French company ceased automobile manufacture and concentrated on production of aircraft engines. A wind tunnel was built in Bois-Colombes for testing engines. Forgeot objected to interference in the company operations by the Minister for Industrial Production.

On 10 March 1938 Léon Blum came back into power. In response to the recent Anschluss, Blum was committed to national defense and wanted to boost armaments production. In the last week of March there were strikes in a number of aviation and metalworking factories in the Paris region. The CGT leaders had accepted a shift system but were willing to work longer hours in the aviation industry as long as they earned overtime pay for anything over 40 hours per week. Forgeot wanted to keep the single-shift system, but with a 48-hour week. Eventually a compromise agreement was reached on 12 April 1938 after Blum had been forced out of office.

During World War II (1939–45) Forgeot replaced Raoul Dautry as president of the Hispano-Suiza operating company when Dautry was named Minister of Armaments in September 1939. In January 1940 Forgeot met Henri Queuille on 5 January 1940 and expressed optimism about the superiority of the French fighter aircraft and the new turbo-charged engines. After the German invasion of France Forgeot was directed on 10 September 1940 to continue the Hispano-Suiza operations in the occupied zone. He replied that he had refused and continued to refuse to make war materials – airplane engines, cannons and munitions – for the German authorities. He proposed to turn over the factories to the French state, at no charge, and they could use them as they saw fit. In December 1940 Forgeot resigned from the presidency of the manufacturing company, but retained the presidency of the French holding company.

Forgeot died on 30 June 1956 in Paris aged 68.

== Publications ==
- Pierre Forgeot (1911). Les lapins de garenne devant la loi et la jurisprudence. impr. Arthur Rousseau. p. 183.
- Louis Rolland; Pierre Forgeot; Maurice Hauriou (1915). Dommages causés aux personnes par les faits de guerre: Notions juridiques de l'invasion. Comité national d'action pour la réparation des dommages causés par la guerre.
- Paul Gauthier; Pierre Forgeot (preface). Les Dommages matériels de la guerre, leur réparation. Guide du sinistré, exposé pratique de la loi du 17 avril 1919 (in French). Cahors, impr. de Coueslant. p. 56.
- Pierre Forgeot (preface) (1929). Les produits finis et la compensation forfaitaire établie par l'article 87 de la loi du 30 mars 1929 (in French). ("Loi Forgeot"). Paris: Ch. Pairault. p. 112.

== Sources ==
- Chapman, Herrick (1991). State Capitalism and Working-class Radicalism in the French Aircraft Industry. University of California Press. ISBN 978-0-520-07125-4.
- Collectif (2001). "Forgeot (Pierre)". Dictionnaire des parlementaires français de 1940 à 1958 (in French). Vol. 4. E-K. Paris: La Documentation française.
- Jolly, Jean (1960–1977). "Forgeot (Pierre)". Dictionnaire des parlementaires français; notices biographiques sur les ministres, députés et sénateurs français de 1889 à 1940 (in French). Paris: Presses universitaires de France. ISBN 2-1100-1998-0.
- Lemps, Xavier Huetz de; Luis, Jean-Philippe (2012-01-01). Sortir du labyrinthe: études d'histoire contemporaine de l'Espagne : hommage à Gérard Chastagnaret. Casa de Velázquez. ISBN 978-84-96820-77-7.
- Maier, Charles S. (2015-10-27). Recasting Bourgeois Europe: Stabilization in France, Germany, and Italy in the Decade after World War I. Princeton University Press. ISBN 978-1-4008-7370-8.
- Niess, Alexandre (2012). L'hérédité en République: les élus et leurs familles dans la Marne, 1871-1940. Presses Univ. Septentrion. ISBN 978-2-7574-0388-4.
- Queuille, Henri (1993). Journal de guerre: 7 septembre 1939-8 juin 1940. Presses Univ. Limoges. ISBN 978-2-910016-03-6.
- Rochebrune, Renaud de; Hazera, Jean-Claude (2013-03-21). Patrons sous l'Occupation (Les). Odile Jacob. ISBN 978-2-7381-2938-3.
- "Timeline/History". Hispano Suiza.
