= Bertrand Nogaro =

French economist and politician

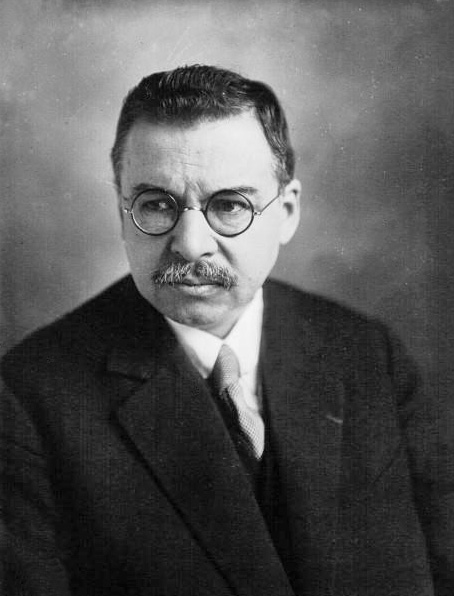
Bertrand Nogaro in 1929

Bertrand Nogaro (5 April 1880 – 7 April 1950) was a French economist and politician. He served as Minister of Public Instruction and Fine Arts in Aristide Briand's tenth government from June to July 1926.

He was elected to the Académie des sciences morales et politiques in 1949.
