= Law on the Freedom of the Press of 29 July 1881 =

French legislation

The Law on the Freedom of the Press of 29 July 1881 (French: Loi sur la liberté de la presse du 29 juillet 1881), often called the Press Law of 1881 or the Lisbonne Law after its rapporteur, Eugène Lisbonne, is a law that defines the freedoms and responsibilities of the media and publishers in France. It provides a legal framework for publications and regulates the display of advertisements on public roads. Although it has been amended several times since its enactment, it remains in force to the present day.

It is often regarded as the foundational legal statement on freedom of the press and freedom of speech in France, inspired by Article 11 of the Declaration of the Rights of Man and of the Citizen of 26 August 1789. At the same time, the law imposes legal obligations on publishers and criminalises certain specific behaviours (called "press offences"), particularly concerning defamation.

== History ==
The Press Law was passed under the French Third Republic in 1881 by the then-dominant Opportunist Republicans who sought to liberalise the press and promote free public discussion. The new law swept away a swathe of earlier statutes, stating at the outset the principle that "Printing and publication are free".

Prior to 1881, French law had a complex and unclear set of laws that regulated public commentary. Slander was regulated by a thicket of jurisprudence that had grown during the century, and numerous laws had been enacted to regulate the press and public censorship at various points during the republican and monarchist regimes of the 19th century. In total, 42 different laws containing 325 separate clauses regulating the press were in force, having been passed over a period of 75 years by ten different governments. Slander against public officials attacked in their public functions was criminalised under a law of 1819, but by 1880 the distinction between private and public affronts had become far from clear. The free exercise of published speech was further limited by onerous requirements to obtain prior authorisation from the government and deposit a sum of "caution money".

== Key principles ==
In place of the confusing mass of legislation that preceded it, the Press Law established a number of basic principles. Publishing was liberalised, with the law requiring only that publishers present their names to the authorities and deposit two copies of every work. The authorities were denied the power to suppress newspapers and the offence of délits d'opinion (crimes of opinion, or types of prohibited speech) was abolished. This had previously enabled prosecutions of critics of the government, monarchy and church, or of those who argued for controversial ideas on property rights. The scope of libel was severely reduced, with the criteria for defamation being much more tightly defined. A limited number of "press offences" was retained, including outraging public morals, and insulting high-ranking public officials including the President of the Republic, heads of foreign states and ambassadors. The law also provided a right of reply for persons to respond to articles in which they were featured.

In addition, the law regulates advertising and permits property owners to forbid the posting of advertisements on their properties. References to the law are frequently seen on French walls where signs proclaim "Defense d'afficher - loi du 29 Juillet 1881" ("posters forbidden - law of 29 July 1881").

=== Defamation ===
One of the most important reforms instituted by the Press Law was a major reduction in the previously extensive range of activities deemed libelous. Libel is defined concisely as "any allegation or imputation of fact striking a blow at the honour or the consideration of a person or a body to which that fact is imputed." It is generally possible to defend oneself from a libel accusation by demonstrating that the libelous facts are true, though this is not accepted in all cases.

An insult (injures) is defined as "an outrageous express, terms of despise or invectives that do not charge any fact to the insulted person."

As originally enacted, the law distinguished between levels of offence and between public officials and private citizens. Defamation of private citizens was treated far less seriously than that of injuring public officials; defaming a man in his public capacity could be punished by a year's imprisonment and a fine of 3,000 francs, while injuring a private citizen could cost as little as 18 francs or six days in prison.

Any statement made in parliament, judicial tribunals or (by implication) administrative councils was exempted from punishment, thereby immunising public officials from liability for slandering colleagues. The law also included differing requirements for protecting public and private individuals. Courts were required to determine the truth of slanderous accusations against public officials, but where private citizens were the victims of slander the law directed magistrates to assess only the degree of offence contained in the slander, specifically forbidding investigation into the truth of the charges. The intention of the legislators was essentially to protect the personal privacy of the accused party.

== Scope and defences ==
As enacted, the Press Law's scope was defined as covering "the press, printing, book sales, periodical press, posters, retailing, street sales, crimes, offences, prosecutions, punishment, and temporary provisions." It applies to statements made publicly, whether through oral or printed means. In recent years, French courts have repeatedly ruled that the law also applies to defamatory content communicated via the World Wide Web.

The law provides a number of defences, particularly when reporting on matters of public interest or concern. Truth of the defamatory statement is available as a defence in most libel cases other than those concerning the privacy of the plaintiff. Where privacy is infringed, truth is not an absolute defence, though some latitude is permitted if the plaintiff is a public figure. A plea of good faith is permitted by the courts in circumstances where the issues at stake concern matters of public interest. A defendant may be acquitted on that basis if the court is satisfied that the defendant has carried out at least a basic verification of the source of the information on which the defamatory statement is based.

== Amendments ==
Some of the more liberal aspects of the 1881 law were overturned in 1944 following the Liberation of France, when new restrictions were introduced on press ownership (with the intention of preventing the concentration of ownership) and greater transparency was introduced in a newspaper's finances and direction.

Racially defamatory comments and incitement to racial hatred were criminalised when the law was amended first by the Marchandeau Decree of 1939 (repealed in 1940 by the Vichy government, reinstated in 1944), then by the Pleven Law of 1 July 1972. The French parliament further amended the Press Law in 2004 to make it a crime to discriminate against or defame individuals on the basis of their sexual orientation. Such offences are punished by jail terms of between six months and a year and a fine of between €22,500 and €45,000.

== Effects of the law ==
The passage of the law had an immediate effect, promoting a rapid expansion in the size and range of the French mass media. In 1872, 3,800 periodical publications were published in France; a decade later, aided by the freedoms granted in 1881, that figure had expanded to 6,000. The citizens of Paris found their choice of newspapers expanding from 23 in 1881 to 60 by 1899. By 1914, a total of 309 daily newspapers were being published in France, with four of those dailies - Le Petit Journal, Le Petit Parisien, Le Journal and Le Matin - selling a million copies every day.

The liberalisation of the law of defamation had a less positive effect, enabling an upsurge in personal innuendo and vague allegations. The sociologist Gabriel Tarde commented that "Pornography and slander have become the life-blood of the newspaper." French readers were treated to a daily diet of rumour, speculation and character assassination presented as "echos" and "faits divers". The French press became increasingly dominated by sensationalist and even malicious reporting as it abused the freedoms granted by the 1881 law to "slander and incite to violence with almost total impunity." The writer Émile Zola personified the mixed benefits of the freedom granted by the law. It enabled him to publish his famous denunciation J'accuse in the newspaper L'Aurore in 1898, something that would have been forbidden 20 years previously, but the torrent of lurid newspaper accusations against the unjustly imprisoned Alfred Dreyfus led Zola to denounce the press as being

"a gutter press in heat, making its money out of pathological curiosity, perverting the masses ... higher up on the scale the popular newspapers, selling for a sou ... inspire atrocious passions ... [as well as] the higher so-called serious and honest press ... recording all with scrupulous care, whether it be true or false."

The excessive liberalisation of the French press is held by some to have contributed to the "decadence" that crippled the Third Republic in the 1930s. Raymond Kuhn suggests that towards the end of the Third Republic in the late 1930s, abuses of the Press Law's freedoms "contribute[d] to the destabilisation of the political system when economic crisis and political scandal rocked the regime."

== See also ==
- Gayssot Act
