= Johnson Act =

1934 United States legislation

Johnson Act of 1934
- Other short titles: Foreign Securities Act
- Long title: An Act to prohibit financial transactions with any foreign government in default on its obligations to the United States.
- Enacted by: the 73rd United States Congress
- Effective: April 13, 1934

Citations
- Public law: Public Law 73-151
- Statutes at Large: 48 Stat. 574

Legislative history
- Introduced in the Senate as S. 682 by Hiram Johnson (R–CA); Committee consideration by Senate Committee on Foreign Relations, House Committee on Foreign Affairs; Passed the Senate on January 11, 1934 (Voice vote); Passed the House on April 4, 1934 (Voice vote); Signed into law by President Franklin D. Roosevelt on April 13, 1934

The Johnson Act of 1934 (Foreign Securities Act, ch. 112, 48 Stat. 574, 18 U.S.C. § 955, 1934-04-13) prohibited foreign nations in debt from marketing their bond issues in the United States. The law was enacted on April 13, 1934, and although it was impacted by the Bretton-Woods Agreement, it was not repealed and continues to have the force of law.

Senator Hiram Johnson sponsored the Act, which included a passage that forbade loans to nations in default on their debts, unless those nations joined the World Bank and International Monetary Fund. The act was a response to nonpayment of war debts from World War I. As it also banned token payments, payments from debtor countries stopped entirely following its passage, with the exception of Finland, which still continued to pay its debt.

On May 5, 1934, Attorney General Homer Stille Cummings rendered an opinion on the meaning of the terms "default" and "partial default" used in the Act. He held that Czechoslovakia, Italy, Latvia, Lithuania, Great Britain and Canada were not in default, despite the fact only Canada had paid its debts, and Soviet Russia was in default.

The law was circumvented with the Lend-Lease Act, which enabled the United States to help Allied Nations during World War II with armaments.
