= Edmond Miellet =

French politician (1880–1953)

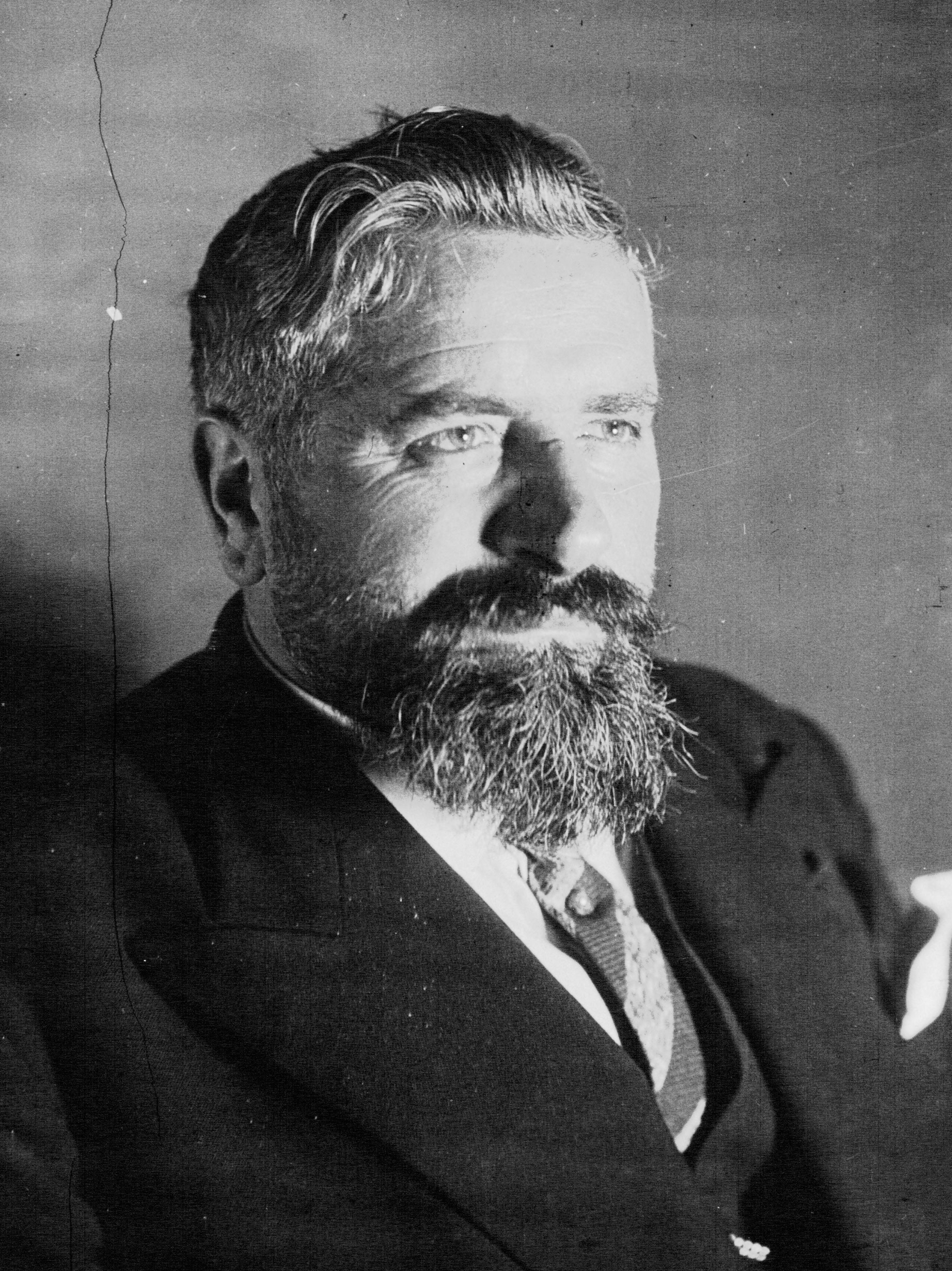
- Born: 1 November 1880; Montbouton, Territoire de Belfort, France
- Died: 24 January 1953 (aged 72); Paris, France
- Occupation: Politician

Edmond Miellet (1880–1953) was a French politician. He served as a member of the Chamber of Deputies from 1919 to 1942, representing Territoire de Belfort.
