= Paul Marchandeau =

French politician (1882–1968)

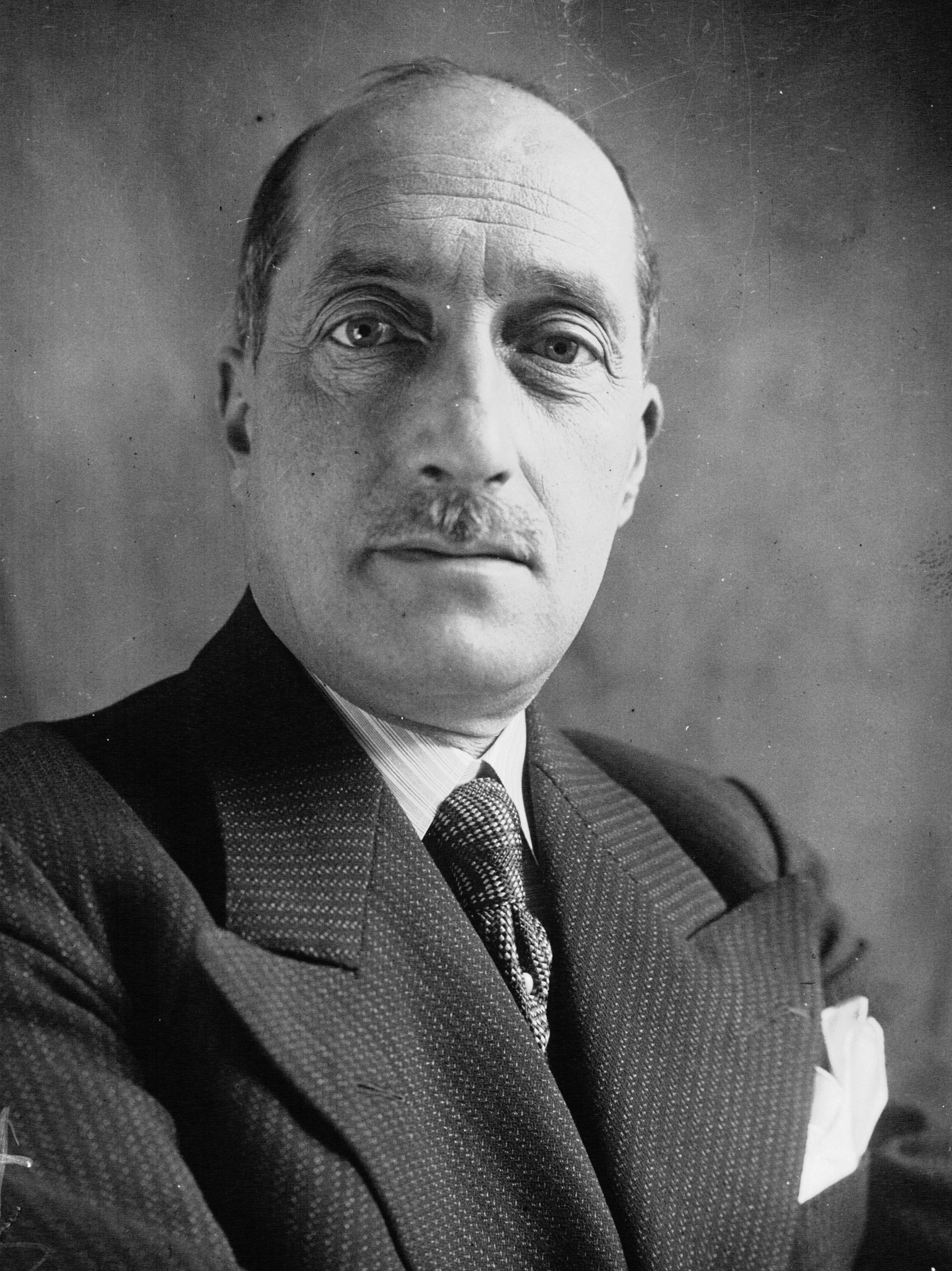
Paul Marchandeau, member of the Marne (1933)

Paul Henri Marie Joseph Marchandeau, (French pronunciation: [pɔl ɑ̃ʁi maʁi ʒozɛf maʁʃɑ̃do]; Gaillac, Tarn on 10 August 1882 - Paris 15th on 31 May 1968), was a lawyer, journalist and French Radical Socialist politician. He was awarded the Croix de guerre and the Légion d'honneur for his actions during World War I. From 1925 until 1942, he was the mayor of Reims. During the 1930s, he was, successively, French minister of finance, minister of the interior, minister of justice, and minister of the budget.

== Youth ==
He was the first captain of the rugby club of the UA Gaillac of 1900–1901. More precisely, he was the captain of the Glaïeuls (school team) and Stade Gaillacois (civil athletic association) (the Athletic Union Gaillacoise not being formed until 20 December 1940).

== Journalist and local elected official ==
In 1911, he started with the Éclaireur de l'Est (Light of the East) and quickly became editor and CEO.

He was elected to the city council and became mayor of Reims in 1925 until he resigned in 1942.

He was president of the Association des maires de France (Association of Mayors of France) in 1934.

He was elected General Councilor of the 3rd canton in 1935 and president of the General Council of the Marne in 1937.

He is a member of the Masonic lodge of Reims La Sincérité, and was one of many elected Freemasons of the Marne.

== Political career ==
In 1926, Paul Marchandeau began a political career on the national level. Elected Deputy of Marne, he has first a number of terms as Undersecretary of State.

- Undersecretary of the Interior of 21 to 25 February 1930 in the government of Chautemps (1)
- Undersecretary to the Presidency of the Council of 13 December 1930 to 22 January 1931 in the Government of Théodore Steeg
- Undersecretary to the Presidency of the Council of 3 June to 14 December 1932 in the Government of Edouard Herriot (3)
- Budget Minister of 23 November 1933 to 27 January 1934 in the Government of Chautemps (2)
- Minister of Finance from 30 January – 7 February 1934 in the Government of Édouard Daladier (2)
- Interior Minister from 13 October – 8 November 1934 in the Government of Gaston Doumergue (2)
- Minister of Commerce and Industry of 8 November 1934 to 31 May 1935 in the Government of Pierre-Étienne Flandin (1)
- Minister of Finance from 18 January to 10 March 1938 in the Government of Chautemps (4)
- Minister of Finance from 10 to 1 April November 1938 in the Government of Édouard Daladier (3)
- Minister of Justice 1 November 1938 to 1 September 1939 in the Government of Édouard Daladier (3) and Government of Édouard Daladier (4)

As Keeper of the Seals, he was the author of the decree of 21 April 1939 amending the Law on the Freedom of the Press of 29 July 1881 by providing prosecution "when defamation or insult committed against a group of persons, by their origin, race or religion, will have been designed to arouse hatred among citizens or residents" (translated). This law was repealed by the law of the Vichy government of 16 August 1940.

On 10 July 1940, the vote in favor of the draft law granting full powers to Marshal Philippe Pétain. He continued his political career under the Vichy regime during World War II (Mayor of Reims, president of the association of mayors of France, receiving the title in August 1942 from Marshal Petain and Pierre Laval). He resigned and retired from political life in 1943.

He was cremated at Père Lachaise Cemetery and his ashes were brought back to be buried in the South Cemetery of Reims where you can see his bronze medallion by Leon Margotin (1859–1937), dated 1930.

== Decorations ==
Knight Legion of Honor; he holds the Croix de guerre 1914–1918.
