= Jean Fabry =

French politician (1876–1968)

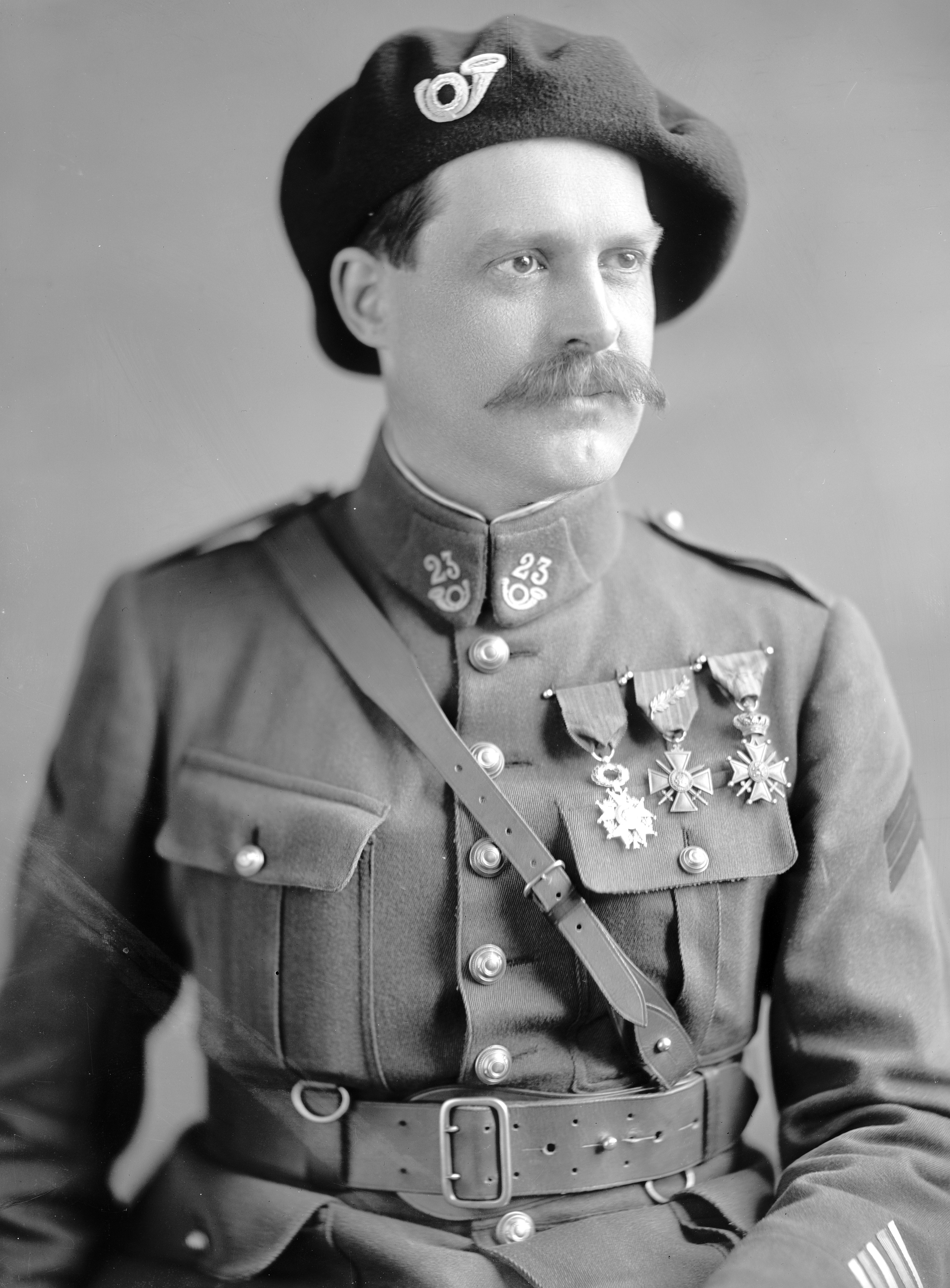
- Born: 6 June 1876; Villefranche-de-Rouergue, Aveyron, France
- Died: 1 June 1968 (aged 91); Montreuil, Seine-Saint-Denis, France
- Education: École spéciale militaire de Saint-Cyr
- Occupation: Politician

Jean Fabry (6 June 1876 – 1 June 1968) was a French politician. He served in the French Army during World War I, and he became an officer of the Legion of Honour for his service. He served as a member of the Chamber of Deputies from 1919 to 1936, representing Seine. He then served as a member of the French Senate from 1936 to 1945, representing Doubs. He was also Minister of Colonies from 29 March to 14 June 1924, and the Minister of National Defence and War from 30 January to 4 February 1934, and from 7 June 1935 to 24 January 1936. He became a grand officer of the Legion of Honour in 1939.

On 10 July 1940, he voted in favour of granting the cabinet presided by Marshal Philippe Pétain authority to draw up a new constitution, thereby effectively ending the French Third Republic and establishing Vichy France. In January 1941, he was made a member of the National Council of Vichy France.

== Works ==
- Fabry, Jean (1931). Joffre et son destin : La Marne. Verdun, la Somme, L'Amérique. Paris: Charles-Lavauzelle. OCLC 490735072.
- Fabry, Jean (1942). De la place de la Concorde au cours de l'intendance. Paris: Les Éditions de France. OCLC 5437201.
- Fabry, Jean (1945). Le "Front humain" : vers une constitution franc̣aise. Paris: Charles-Lavauzelle. OCLC 23426922.
- Fabry, Jean (1960). J'ai connu. Paris: Éditions Descamps. OCLC 22499823.
