= Pierre Comert =

French journalist and diplomat

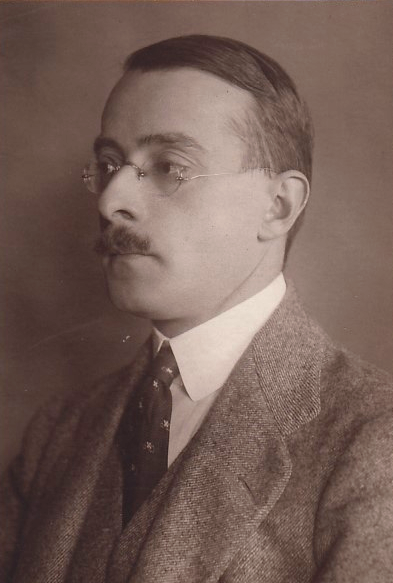
Director of the Information Section of the League of Nations (1919–1932)

Pierre Comert (1880–1964) was a French journalist and diplomat. He was the director of the Information section of the League of Nations from 1919 to 1932 and the head of the Information and Press Service of the Ministry of Foreign Affairs from 1933 to 1938. In August 1940, in London, he founded the FRANCE daily.

== Early life ==
Born in 1880 in Montpellier, the son of a general of the Engineer Regiment, he went to the École normale supérieure in 1900. Then, he was nominated as an associate professor of German in the secondary school in Bourges. The following year, he went around the world for one year, thanks to a scholarship financed by the philanthropist Albert Kahn. He resided, in particular, in the United States, Japan and China.

During his travels, he found a passion for political problems and international relationships. On 18 April 1906, he was an accidental witness of the San Francisco earthquake; he related it in the French daily newspaper Le Temps without realising he was starting his journalist career.

== Journalist ==
After returning from his travels, he moved to Germany as a lecturer in the Göttingen University. Then, he was employed by Le Temps as a correspondent in Vienna, at the time capital of the Austro-Hungarian Empire, and was deemed in 1911 a particular correspondent of that newspaper in Berlin. His telegrams described and analyzed the progress of the militaristic ambitions of the German government and the feverish but also worried ambiance that slowly gained Berlin. Comert remained the German capital until 1 August 1914, two days before the declaration of war. In his last article as a correspondent of Le Temps, he related his return trip, particularly eventful.

As the war was declared, affected by "excessive myopia" (9.5 diopters), he was appointed to the press service of the Ministry of Foreign Affairs, then became in February 1916 a press officer for the French embassy in London.

== Interwar period ==
In 1919, he actively participated in the creation of the League of Nations, in London, next to especially Jean Monnet and Sir Eric Drummond. He became one of the five directors of the League.

While the support of the public was, even more than those of the governments, of utmost importance for the future of the new international organisation, Comert created the Information Section of the League of Nations.to manage the press. With his team, with 19 members in 1930, he established new relationships between diplomats and the press, making official documents public even before they were sent to the General Assembly or to the Council of the League of Nations.

Called the 'Cherished Child of the League of Nations', he had a real influence on the events until the end of 1932, which marked his departure, as demanded by the ultra-nationalist German government in place at the time (the latter accepted to nominate the Frenchman Joseph Avenol to general secretary).

In January 1933, he was nominated in Paris as the chief of the new press service of the Ministry of Foreign Affairs and served as a spokesman. A leftist democrat even though he never joined a political party, he was notably a fervent defender of the German anti-Nazis refugees in France.

His strong opposition to the Munich Agreement had him fired from this position by the Minister Georges Bonnet. Nominated as head of the American Sub-Division of the Quai d’Orsay, with the rank of plenipotentiary minister, he witnessed the disastrous events of 1940 and fled, along with Paul Reynaud’s government, to Tours then to Bordeaux.

== FRANCE daily ==
Comert left Bordeaux to go to London on 17 June, on board of the Madura.

With a few colleagues and friends (such as Charles and Georges Gombault, Marcel Hoden, Louis Lévy), he founded the FRANCE daily newspaper, of which he was to be the director until its last issue (after the Liberation, the newspaper kept being published under a weekly format, until June 1948).

Mainly aimed to the French people in Britain. With 20,000 French soldiers and sailors, the daily sold about 35,000 copies every day and had an increasing success. Financed by the British government but with an independent tone, it strongly supported the war efforts of Free France. The fact that it failed to join political creed of De Gaulle gave much practical difficult. It became precious for its information and analysis on the progress of the war, particularly on the French Resistance.

== Later life ==
In 1949, he entered the Foreign Service of Paris Match/He retired in 1960 and split his life between Sommières, Gard, where he owned a house, and his flat in the Place des Pyramides, in Paris, where he died in 1964.
