= Georges Bonnet =

French politician (1889–1973)

Georges-Étienne Bonnet
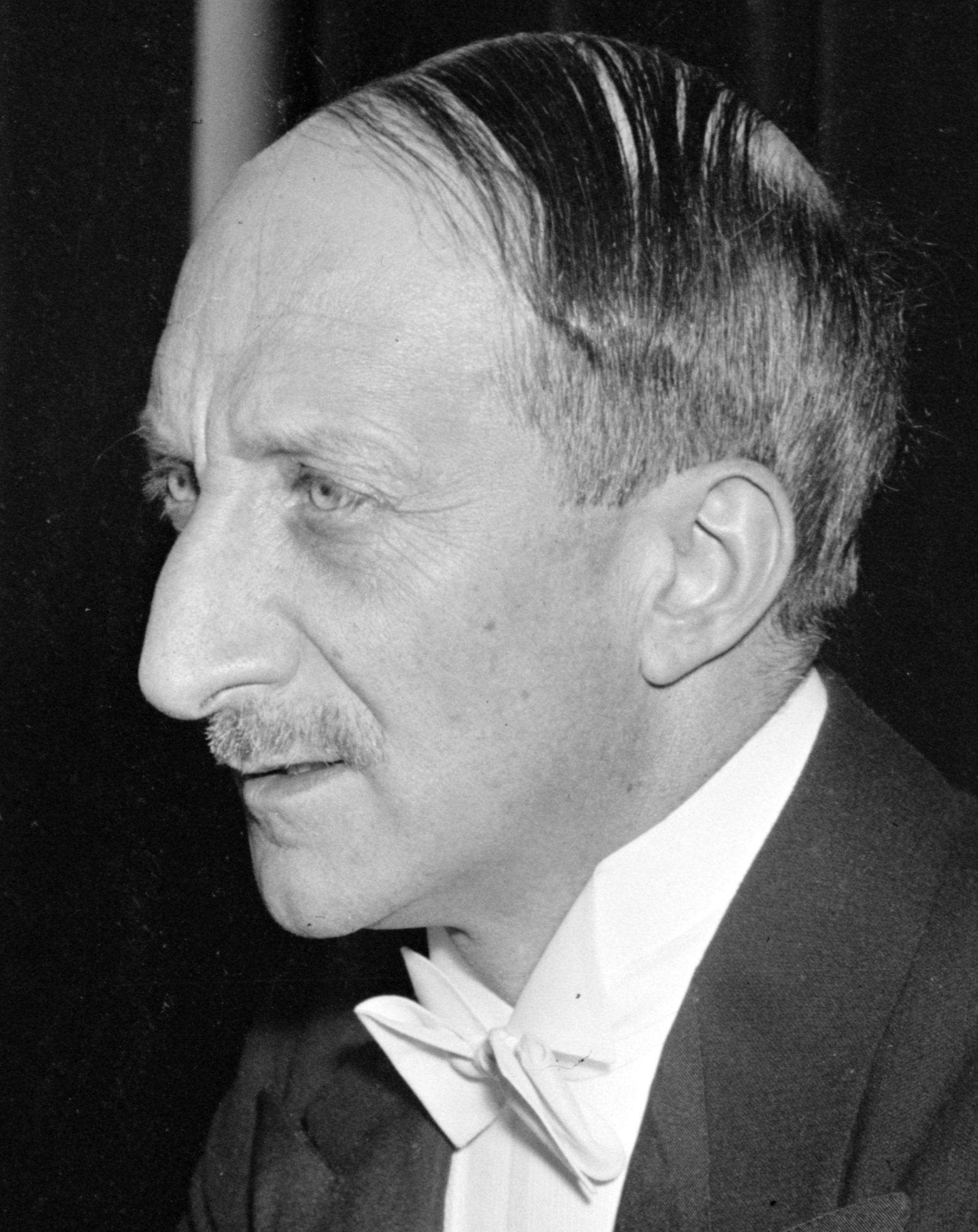
- Bonnet in Washington, D.C., 1937

Minister of Foreign Affairs
- In office 10 April 1938 – 13 September 1939
- Prime Minister: Édouard Daladier
- Preceded by: Joseph Paul-Boncour
- Succeeded by: Édouard Daladier

Personal details
- Born: 22 July 1889
- Died: 18 June 1973 (aged 83)
- Party: Radical-Socialist Party
- Spouse: Odette Pelletan
- Children: 2
- Education: Sorbonne
- Occupation: Politician
- Known for: Advocate of appeasement
- Awards: Croix de guerre

Military service
- Allegiance: France
- Branch/service: French Army
- Years of service: 1914–1918
- Battles/wars: First World War

Georges-Étienne Bonnet (French pronunciation: [ʒɔʁʒ etjɛn bɔnɛ]; 23 July 1889 – 18 June 1973) was a French politician who served as foreign minister in 1938 and 1939 and was a leading figure in the Radical Party. He advocated for the maximum appeasement of Hitler prior to the Second World War.

== Early life and career ==
Bonnet was born in Bassillac, Dordogne, the son of a lawyer. Bonnet's father worked at the Cour de cassation and used his wealth to give his son the best education that money could buy in France. Bonnet was educated the elite Lycée Henri IV, École supérieure des hautes études and École des sciences politiques. Bonnet studied law and political science at the École Libre des Sciences Politiques and University of Paris.

Bonnet began his career as an auditeur at the Conseil d'État. In 1911, he launched his political career after he married Odette Pelletan, the granddaughter of Eugène Pelletan. Bonnet's wife, often known as Madame Soutien-Georges, ran a salon and had great ambitions for her husband. One contemporary reported that Madame Bonnet was "so wildly ambitious for her husband that when a new ministry was being formed he was afraid to go home at night unless he had captured a post for himself." Many privately mocked Bonnet for the way in which his wife dominated him. Bonnet's wife's nickname was a French pun on the word for brassiere (soutien-gorge) and was both a reference to Madame Bonnet and to the size of her breasts.

In 1914, Bonnet joined the French Army. During his service during the First World War, Bonnet was a much-decorated soldier who won the Croix de guerre medal for bravery under fire. in 1918 he served as director of demobilization. Bonnet served as the editor on Alfred de Tarde's book L'âme du soldat (The Soul of a Soldier). Bonnet highlighted the passage by de Tarde in which he wrote: "The France of 1914-1917 is more sincerely democratic than it has ever been, and she is in love with command". As an upper-class man, Bonnet was in some awe of the camaraderie and fighting spirit of the mostly lower-class poilus and saw it as his duty to record their experiences. Bonnet seemed to have been jealous of the toughness of the ordinary French soldiers, who lived under conditions that he could never accept. Bonnet often recounted the story of a poilu, named Lauteau, a happily married man with two children, who was killed while displaying a reckless disregard for his own life while he was repairing a telephone wire that had been severed by German artillery. Bonnet used the story of Lauteau as an example of the Union sacrée in action, as he argued in his 1919 book Lettres à un bourgeois de 1914 that it was love of la patrie that had inspired the poilus to resist.

In 1919, Bonnet served as a secretary to the French delegation at the Paris Peace Conference of 1919 and wrote a book, Lettres à un bourgeois de 1914, that called for widespread social reforms. The British historian Anthony Adamthwaite noted that Lettres à un bourgeois de 1914 was the last serious interest that Bonnet was to display in social reform.

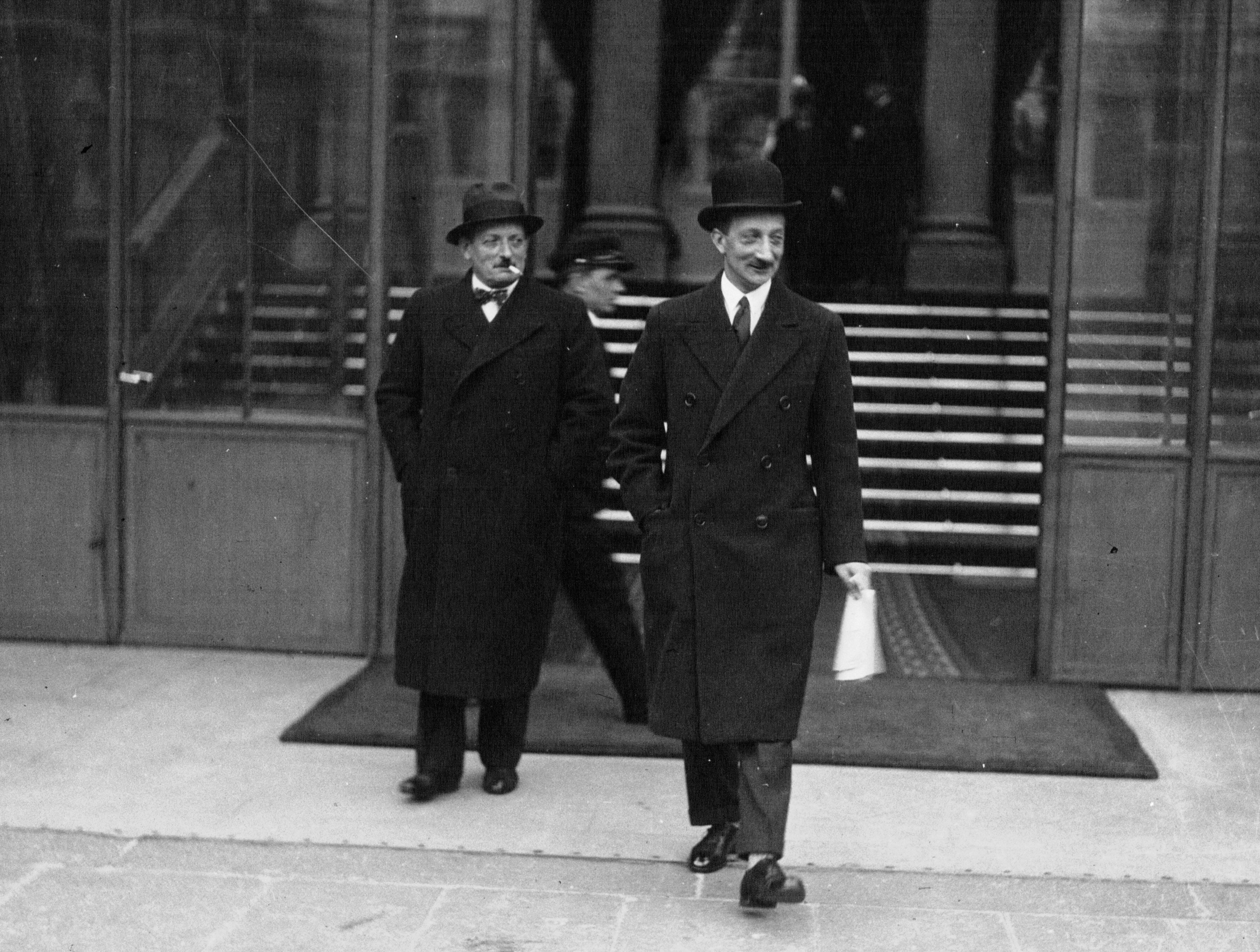
Geogres Bonnet with Charles Daniélou in 1933.

Bonnet served in the Chamber of Deputies from 1924 to 1928 and again from 1929 to 1940. He was appointed undersecretary of state in 1925, the first in a series of high ministerial positions throughout the 1920s and the 1930s. During his time as in the Chamber, Bonnet was regarded as a leading expert in financial and economic matters. As a minister, Bonnet had a reputation for working hard, being always well prepared in parliamentary debates and excelling at political intrigue. In 1931, in response to an appeal for help from China, the League of Nations sent a group of educational experts to suggest improvements to the Chinese educational system. The experts were Carl Heinrich Becker, the former education minister of Prussia; the Christian Socialist British historian R. H. Tawney who was the only member of the group who had been to China before and who could speak some Mandarin; Marian Falski, a senior bureaucrat with the Polish Ministry of Education in charge of all primary schools in Poland; and the scientist Paul Langevin of the Collège de France. Bonnet joined the group, as he was serving as the director of the Paris-based Institution of Intellectual Co-Operation, and the League wanted someone outside of the educational system to serve as the chairman of the group.

On 30 August 1931, the group left for China and saw first-hand the furious protests that erupted all over China in response to the Japanese invasion of Manchuria, which had started on 19 September 1931. Although most of the university and high school students in China were protesting the loss of Manchuria, the group was able to have cordial talks with Chinese educational officials about possible reforms and in 1932 released the book The Reorganisation of Education in China. In 1932, Bonnet headed the French delegation at the Lausanne Conference, where he first met Franz von Papen, who was serving as the German chancellor. During the Lausanne Conference, British Prime Minister Ramsay MacDonald, commenting on Bonnet's abilities, asked: "Why isn't he in the Cabinet?"

== Economic expert ==
In 1933, Bonnet was a prominent member of the French delegation to the London Conference and was a leading critic of President Franklin D. Roosevelt's actions during the conference. In 1936, Bonnet emerged as the leader of 18 Radical deputies who objected to their party's participation in the Popular Front. Bonnet was regarded as the leader of the right wing of the Radical Socialist party, which, despite its name, was neither radical nor socialist. As a result, the French Premier Léon Blum, a socialist, effectively exiled Bonnet in January 1937 by appointing him Ambassador to the United States even though Bonnet did not speak English.

Upon hearing of Bonnet's appointment, the American Ambassador to France, William Christian Bullitt, Jr., wrote to President Franklin D. Roosevelt about Bonnet:

"I don't think you'll like him. He is extremely intelligent and competent on economic and financial matters, but he's not a man of character. You may remember that he led the French delegation to the London economic conference where he led the attacks against you".

Despite his short stay in the United States and his inability to speak English, Bonnet thereafter and for the rest of his life claimed to be an expert on all things American.

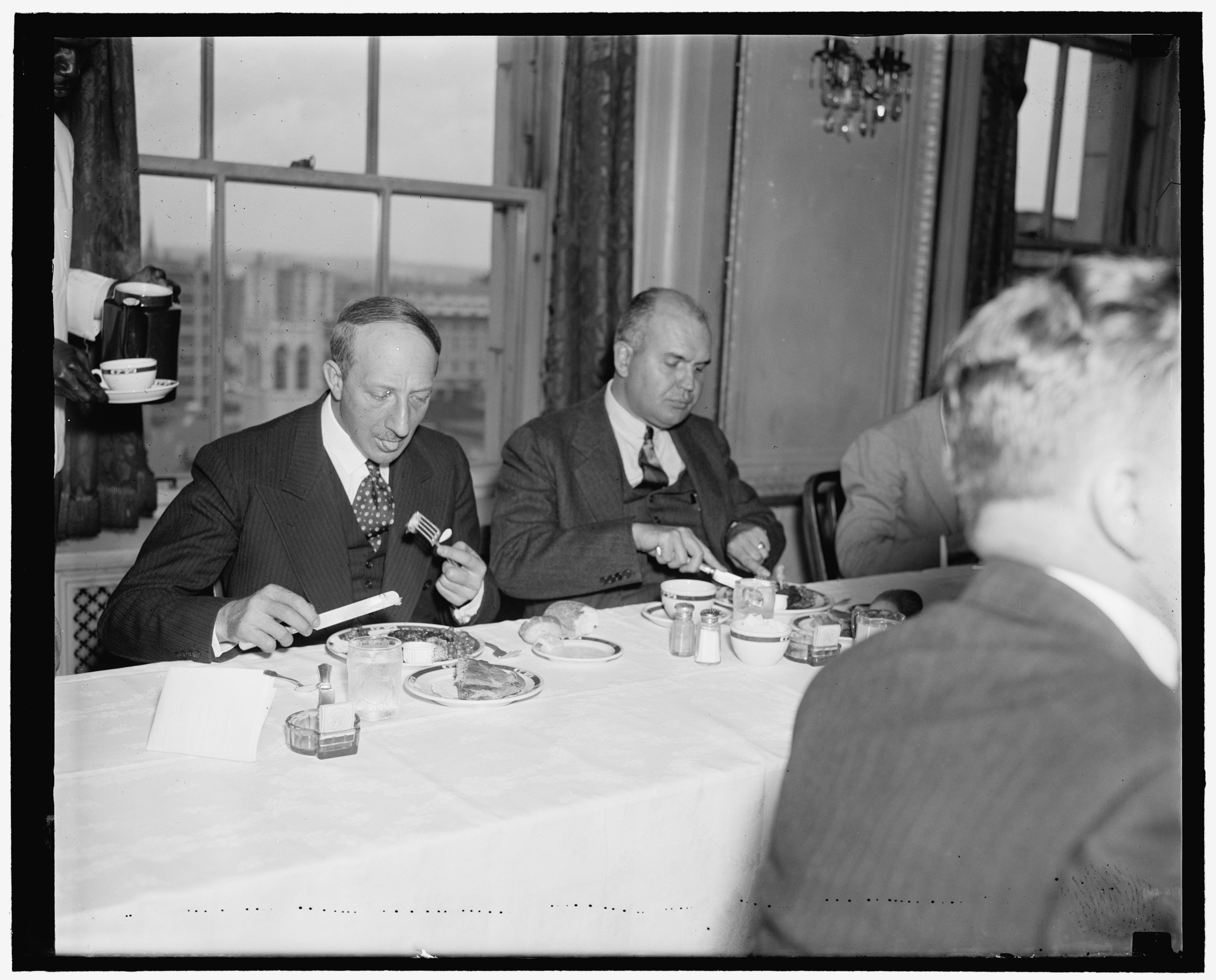
Geogres Bonnet at the National Press Club in Washington, 13 May 1937

On 28 June 1937, Bonnet returned to France when Premier Camille Chautemps appointed him Finance Minister. Bonnet's first major act as Finance Minister was to oversee the devaluation of the franc, the second devaluation in less than nine months, with the value of the franc going from 110.8 francs per British pound to 147.20. The devaluation was forced on Bonnet since the 10 billion francs that had been set aside in September 1936 in a currency reserve fund to defend the value of the franc after that year's devaluation had been spent by mid-1937. As Finance Minister, Bonnet imposed sharp cuts in military spending. He felt that the costs of the arms race with Germany were such that it was better for France to reach an understanding that might end the arms race than continue to spend gargantuan sums on the military. Besides the economic problems associated with budgetary stability and his attempts to maintain the value of the franc against currency speculation, Bonnet was concerned with the social conflict caused by the need for increased taxation and the decreased social services to pay for arms.

In a meeting with Papen, now the German Ambassador to Austria, in November 1937, Bonnet and Chautemps expressed the hope that an understanding might be reached in which France might accept Central and Eastern Europe as Germany's exclusive sphere of influence in return for German acceptance of Western Europe as France's sphere of influence. Moreover, Bonnet became the leading spokesman within the French Cabinet for the idea that the French alliance system in Eastern Europe, the so-called cordon sanitaire, was a net liability that served only to embroil France in conflicts with Germany. Throughout his career, Bonnet was noted as an advocate of "sacred egoism": French interests should always take precedence over other nations' interests. Bonnet regarded himself as a "realist", and his thinking on foreign policy tended to be coloured in equal measure by pragmatism and insularity.

Bonnet's cuts in military spending led to a clash with War Minister Édouard Daladier, who persuaded the Cabinet to rescind the most severe cuts to the French Army budget by pointing out that in the current international climate, the Army needed more funding, not less. Since the Ministers of the Air and the Marine were not as substantial personalities as Daladier, the French Navy and French Air Force could not reverse the Finance Minister's cuts. In January 1938, after the fall of Chautemps's government, Bonnet made a serious effort to form a new government but in the end had to content himself with being appointed Minister of State.

== Foreign Minister of the republic, 1938–1939 ==
=== Appointment as foreign minister ===
In April 1938, after the fall of the second Blum government, Bonnet was appointed Foreign Minister under Daladier as premier (they had reconciled their 1937 quarrel). In 1938 and 1939, there were three factions within the French government. One, the "peace lobby" led by Bonnet, felt that France could not afford an arms race with Nazi Germany and sought a détente with the Reich. As an expert in financial matters and a former finance minister, Bonnet was acutely aware of the damages inflicted by the arms race on an economy that was already weakened by the Great Depression. A second faction, led by Paul Reynaud, Jean Zay and Georges Mandel, favoured a policy of resistance to German expansionism. A third faction, led by Daladier, stood halfway between the other two and favoured appeasement of Germany to buy time to rearm. The American historian Ernest R. May wrote: "Small and dapper with a pointed long nose and a prominent Adam's apple, Georges Bonnett was privately mocked behind his back for overdoing the bidding of his young, sensual and well-to-do wife, Odette Pelletan.... But Bonnet was no lightweight.... As a minister, he worked long hours, always knew his briefs and had formidable skill at parliamentary intrigue". The secretary-general of the Quai d'Orsay, Alexis St. Léger, later wrote that of the many foreign ministers he served, Bonnet was the worst, and he described Bonnet as a man committed to appeasement.

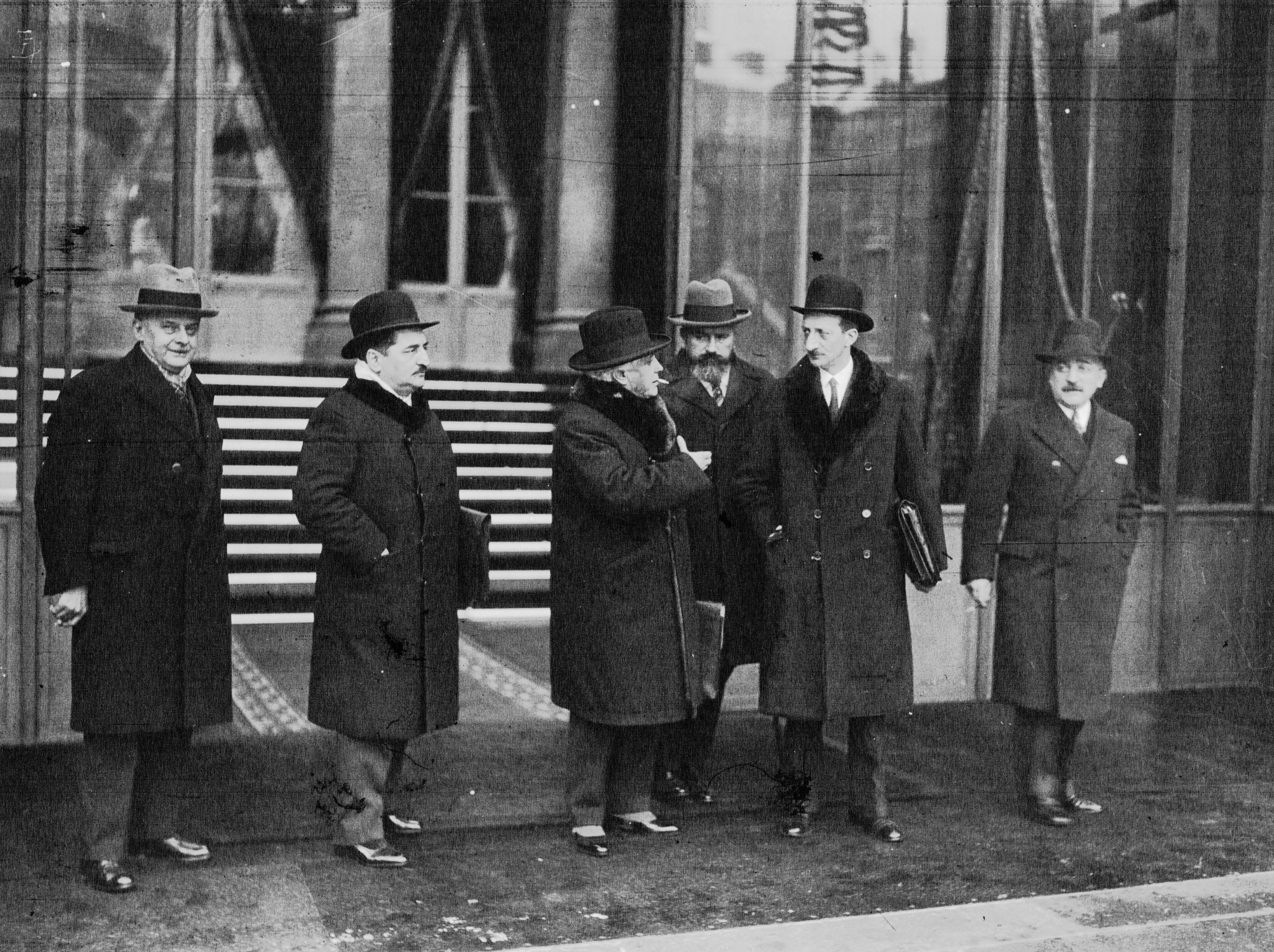
Geogres Bonnet, second from the right with a group of French ministers, 1933. Bonnet is speaking to Joseph Paul-Boncour.

Daladier left foreign policy largely to Bonnet as the best way of avoiding a war against Germany in 1938. In addition, Daladier felt that the best way of watching Bonnet was to include him in the Cabinet: he wished to keep the Popular Front together, but Bonnet wanted to pull the Radical Socialists out of it. Daladier's thought if Bonnet were outside of the Cabinet, his ability to engage in intrigues to break up the Popular Front and seize the premiership for himself would be correspondingly increased. Including him in the Cabinet limited his room to maneuver. The Radical Socialist Party, which had a largely-lower-middle class membership, was divided between a left-liberal wing associated with Daladier that was willing to accept participation in the Popular Front as a way to defend France from fascism both at home and abroad and a right-wing "neo-radical" wing that was associated with Bonnet and saw the participation in the Popular Front as a betrayal of the party's traditional defence of private property and capitalism. The "neo-radical" wing of the Radicals tended to support appeasement and saw the foreign policy of the Popular Front as potentially leading France into a disastrous war with Germany that would benefit only the Soviet Union. The Radicals were mostly the party of farmers, small businessmen and tradesmen but the party was dependent upon donations from wealthier businessmen, and the "neo-radical" Bonnet's presence in an influential position as the foreign minister helped Daladier resist pressure from the more conservative Radical deputies, senators and the industrialists to pull the party out of the Popular Front. An additional complication in the Daladier-Bonnet relationship was posed by Bonnet's desire for the premiership, which gradually led to a breakdown with his once warm relations with Daladier.

Bonnet was extremely critical of what he regarded as the "warmongers" of the Quai d'Orsay, and from the very beginning of his time as Foreign Minister, he tended to exclude his senior officials from the decision-making progress and preferred instead to concentrate authority in his own hands. In Bonnet's opinion, the Franco-Czechoslovak Treaty of 1924 committing France to come to the aid of Czechoslovakia in the event of a German invasion was a millstone and could lead France into a disastrous war with Germany. Bonnet believed that the best course for France in 1938 was to pressure the Czechoslovak government into conceding to German demands to prevent a Franco-German war. Alternatively, if the Czechoslovaks refused to make concessions, that refusal could be used as an excuse for ending the alliance. While pursuing that course, Bonnet not only kept his senior officials at the Quai d'Orsay uninformed but sometimes also Daladier. That led the Premier to rebuke his Foreign Minister several times for behaving as if French foreign policy was made by "one minister".

Between 27 and 29 April 1938, Bonnet visited London with Daladier for meetings with Neville Chamberlain and Lord Halifax to discuss the possibility of a German-Czechoslovak war breaking out and what the two governments could do to stop such a war. During the talks, the French ministers argued for firm declarations that both nations would go to war in the event of a German aggression and agreed to a British suggestion that the two nations pressure Prague into making concessions to the Sudeten Heimfront of Konrad Henlein. The London summit marked the beginning of a pattern that was to last throughout 1938 in which the French would begin talks with the British by demanding a harder line against the Reich and then agree to follow the British line. In the view of Bonnet and Daladier, those tactics allowed them to carry out their foreign policy goals but provide them with a cover from domestic critics by presenting their foreign policy as the result of British pressure. As Bonnet told Bullitt, his "whole policy was based on allowing the British full latitude to work out the dispute" because otherwise, France would have to bear the main responsibility for pressuring concessions on Czechoslovakia. Throughout summer 1938, Bonnet allowed most of the diplomatic pressure that was applied to Czechoslovak President Edvard Beneš for concessions to Henlein to come from London. That led to sharp complaints from the British that Bonnet should do more to apply pressure on Beneš.

Bonnet's relations with Wellington Koo, the Chinese ambassador in Paris, were difficult, as Bonnet was in favour of ending arms shipments to China as a way of improving relations with Japan. One of the main supply lines that kept China fighting was the railroad linking of French Indochina to China. The arms from the Soviet Union were landed at the port of Haiphong and were taken via trains to China. Bonnet's great rival, Colonial Minister Georges Mandel allowed the Soviet arms to be transshipped via French Indochina over the intense protests of Bonnet, who warned him that the Japanese would invade French Indochina in response. Mandel argued against Bonnet that to allow the Japanese to conquer China would make it more likely that the Japanese would try to seize French Indochina and so it was in France's own self-interest to keep China fighting. When the dispute between Bonnet and Mandel reached Daladier, Daladier listened to Mandel.

Between 9 and 14 May 1938, Bonnet attended the spring sessions of the League of Nations in Geneva. There, Bonnet met with the Soviet Foreign Commissar Maxim Litvinov, who offered vague and evasive answers to Bonnet's questions about what the Soviet Union proposed to do in the event of a German attack on Czechoslovakia. Meanwhile, Bonnet was informed by the Polish and Romanian delegations at the League that if Germany invaded Czechoslovakia, they would refuse the Red Army transit rights to Czechoslovakia's aid and that any Soviet violation of their neutrality would be resisted with force. After his return to Paris, Bonnet met a visiting Lord Halifax and urged him to "work as hard as he could for a settlement in Czechoslovakia so that the French would not be faced with a crisis which they definitely did not want to face". As Halifax reported to the British Cabinet, Bonnet "wanted His Majesty's Government to put as much pressure as possible on Dr. Beneš to reach a settlement with the Sudeten-Deutsch in order to save France from the cruel dilemma between dishonouring her agreement [the Franco-Czechoslovak alliance of 1924] or becoming involved in war".

=== May Crisis ===
During the 1938 May Crisis, Bonnet advised Lord Halifax on 21 May that Britain should warn Berlin that if the Germans attacked Czechoslovakia, Britain would become involved in the ensuing war, only to be informed that London had already delivered such a warning. In a talk with the British Ambassador, Sir Eric Phipps, Bonnet attacked Beneš for ordering partial Czechoslovak mobilization without informing France first and criticised Prague for its "hasty action", but at a meeting with the Czechoslovak Minister to Paris, Štefan Osuský, on 21 May, Bonnet did not criticise Prague in violation of his promises to Phipps. Phipps urged Bonnet to use the crisis as an excuse to renounce the Franco-Czechoslovak alliance of 1924, but Bonnet refused unless France could secure a stronger commitment from Britain to come to France's aid in the event of war with Germany. Throughout the 1938 crisis, Count Johannes von Welczeck, the German ambassador in Paris, reported to Berlin statements from Daladier and especially Bonnet that seemed to suggest that France would not to go to war if Germany invaded Czechoslovakia. Adamthwaite wrote if the dispatches that Welczeck were sending back to Berlin recording what Bonnet had told him had been public knowledge in France in 1938, Bonnet would almost certainly would have been forced to resign in disgrace.

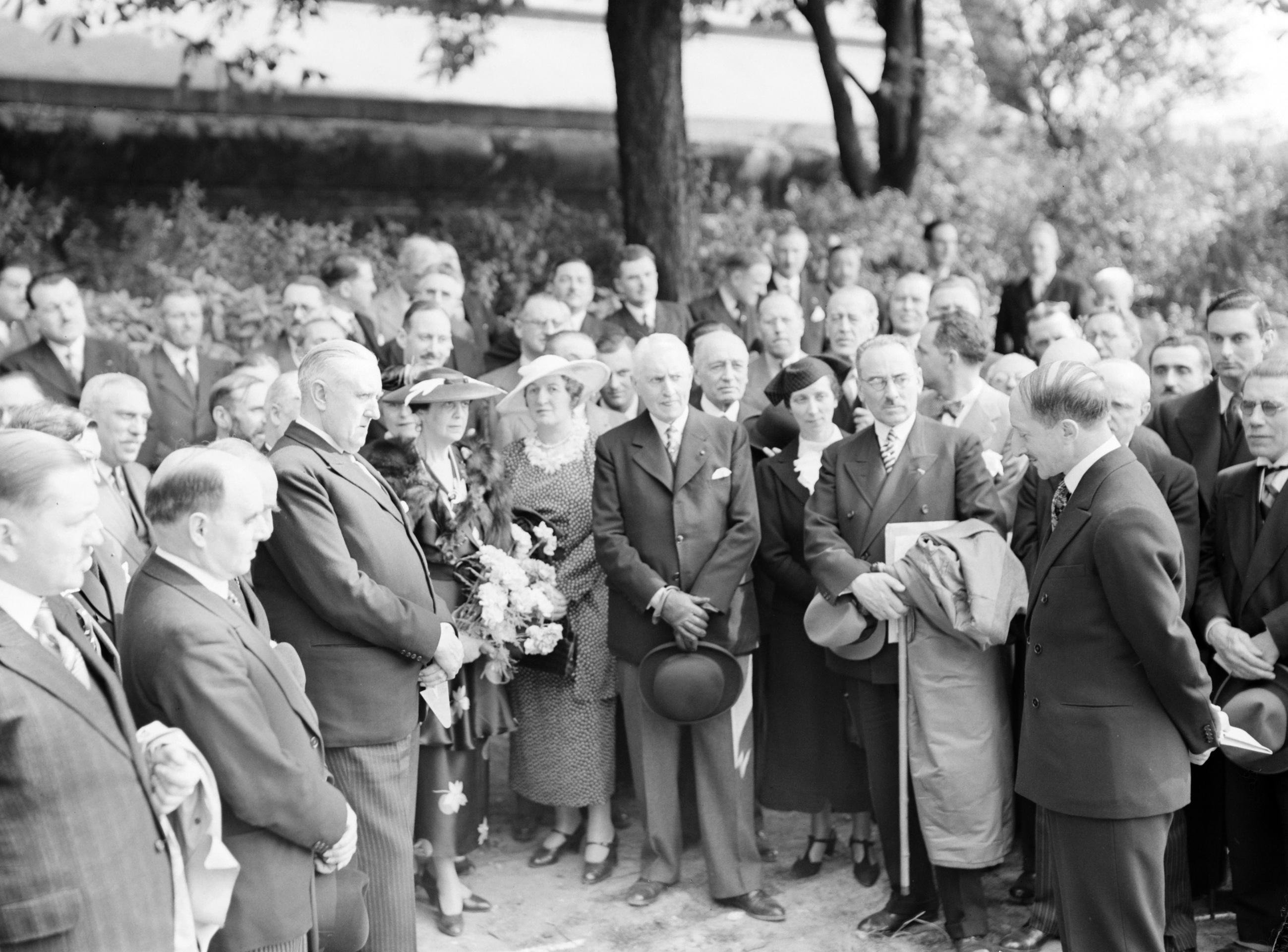
Georges Bonnet giving a speech, 1936

During the crisis, Bonnet issued a cautiously worded press statement supporting Prague but refused to issue a démarche in Berlin. At a subsequent meeting with Phipps on 22 May, Bonnet was informed not to interpret the British warnings to Berlin during the May Crisis as a blank cheque of British support for either Czechoslovakia or France. Bonnet took "copious notes" on the British message and stated that "if Czechoslovakia were really unreasonable, the French Government might well declare that France considered herself released from her bond". On 25 May 1938, Bonnet told Welczeck that France would honour her alliance with Czechoslovakia if Germany invaded that nation, and he highlighted his main foreign policy goals when he declared that "if the problem of the minorities in Czechoslovakia was settled peacefully, economic and disarmament problems might be considered".

Welczeck reported to Berlin on 25 May 1938 that Bonnet had told him during the same meeting that France "recognised the effort" made by German to prevent the May Crisis from turning into a war. Bonnet's account of the meeting recorded him as saying, "I pointed out to Count Welczeck that if I had not asked him officially to come earlier it was because I feared that in this period of tension it might have been considered that I was making a comminatory démarche". On 26 May, Bonnet received a note from Colonel Józef Beck, the foreign minister of Poland, that promised that Poland would go to war against Germany if France did so even though the Franco-Polish alliance was only a defensive one, and Beckwas ready for "a friendly discussion of all new phenomena in Central Europ, based on a mutual understanding of the interests of France and Poland". Bonnet was not interested in Beck's offer and did not reply.

On 31 May, Bonnet refused a British request for an Anglo-French démarche to Beneš demanding concessions to the Sudeten German Heimfront, but he promised to commit the French Minister in Prague, Victor de Lacroix, to do more to pressure the Czechoslovaks. In his instructions to Lacroix for the démarche, Bonnet instead merely asked for more information and stated: "The information that you have transmitted to me on the state of the negotiations between the Prime Minister and the representatives of the Sudetens does not allow me to pronounce as fully as the British Government believes itself able to do on the character and substance of M. Henlein's proposals.... I ask you, therefore to obtain urgently the necessary details on the proposals submitted to M. Hodža". The British discovery of Bonnet's instructions, which Lacroix inadvertently revealed to the British Minister in Prague, Sir Basil Newton, led to much Anglo-French recrimination.

=== Sudetenland Crisis ===
Bonnet was the leading voice for appeasement in France. He was a munichois, a defeatist and pacifist. The British historian Martin Thomas described Bonnet as the most "active" voice for the appeasement of Japan in the French Cabinet, as Bonnet argued that French Indochina, the most profitable French colony in the world, was militarily indefensible and that France must not provoke Japan by supporting China. From June 1938 onward, the prospect of war against Germany made Bonnet more in favor of the appeasement of Japan as he believed that Japan would take advantage of war in Europe to seize French Indochina. Throughout the spring and the early summer of 1938, Bonnet refused to apply pressure on Czechoslovakia through official channels and instead used unofficial emissaries to carry the message that France might not go to war in the event of a German invasion, which led Prague to place more assurance on French statements of public support that was warranted.

Bonnet had his friend, the journalist Jules Saurerwein, tell Beneš in an interview: "Victory is not a state that endures forever". Not until 17 July 1938 would Bonnet issue a set of instructions to Lacroix, which explicitly warned Beneš and Czechoslovak Prime Minister Milan Hodža that because of the attitude of the British, France could not risk a war in 1938, and Prague should do its utmost to reach a settlement with Germany.

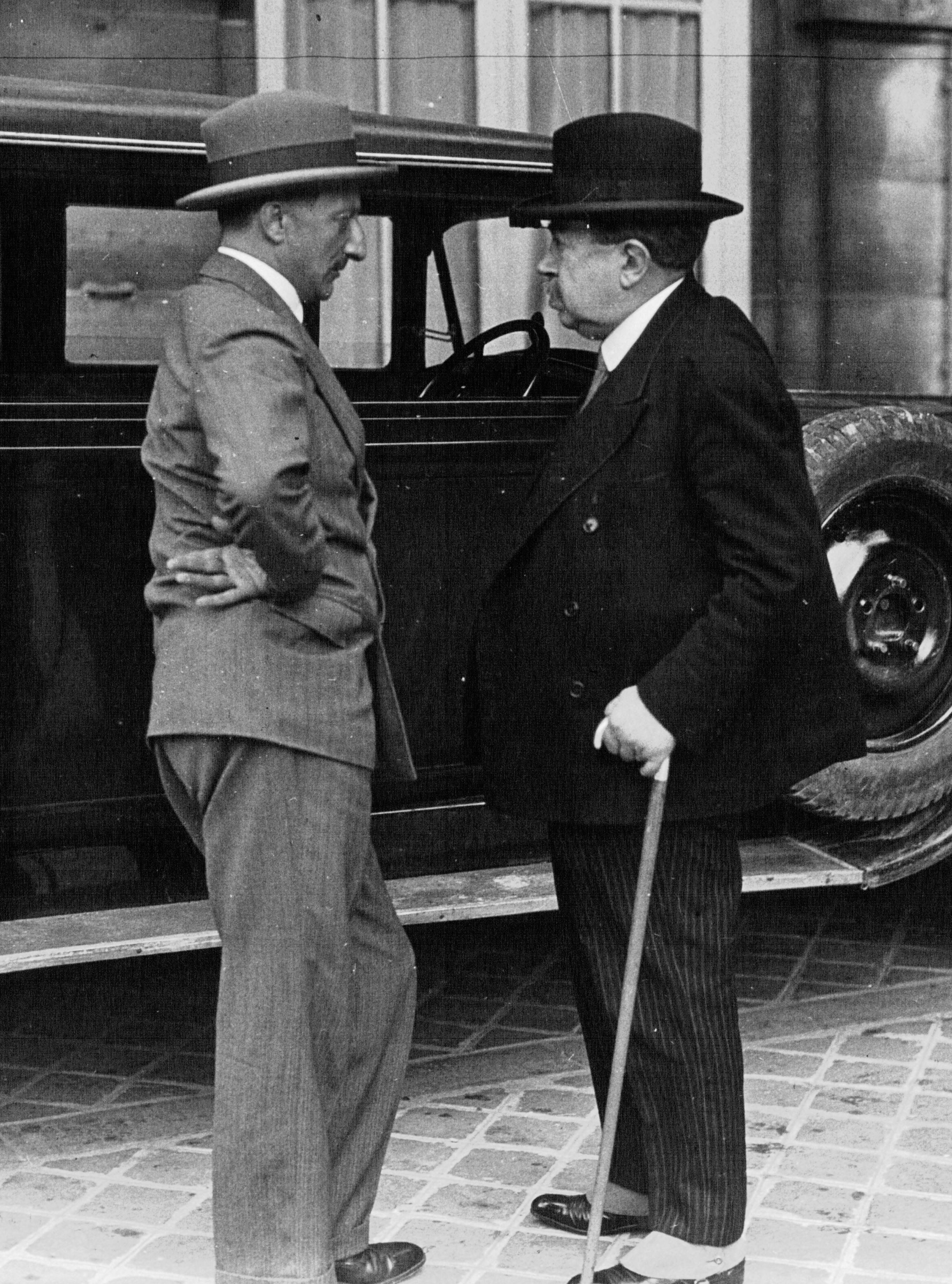
Bonnet speaking to Paul Painlevé, 1932

Starting with the May Crisis, Bonnet began a campaign of lobbying the United States to become involved in European affairs by asking that Washington inform Prague that in the event of a German-Czechoslovak war, the "Czech government would not have the sympathy of the American government if it should not attempt seriously to produce a peaceful solution...by making concessions to the Sudeten Germans which would satisfy Hitler and Henlein". In a meeting with US Ambassador William Christian Bullitt, Jr. on 16 May 1938, Bonnet stated his belief that another war against Germany would be more dreadful than any previous war and that Bonnet "would fight to the limit against the involvement of France in the war". As part of his effort to gain Bullitt's trust, Bonnet showed the American notes received from the British ambassador, Sir Eric Phipps, during the May Crisis. In a radio broadcast that was sent directly to the United States on 4 July 1938, Bonnet proclaimed his belief in the "common ideals" that linked France and the United States as a way of pressuring for greater American interest in the crisis in Central Europe.

In June 1938, there was a major dispute between Daladier and Bonnet over the question of continuing French arms shipments to the Spanish Republicans during the Spanish Civil War. The Italian intervention in the Spanish Civil War had created a major strategic problem for French policy-makers. Because of Germany's greater population, it was considered crucial in France to tap the vast manpower of North Africa to compensate for it. That strategy required French control of the western Mediterranean to ensure that no inference would be possible with troop convoys from Algeria to Marseille. As a result of the Italian intervention, a number of Italian bases had been set up in the strategic Balearic Islands. It was widely feared in France that the Italians would at least receive permission from the Spanish Nationalists to make their presence in the Baleric Islands permanent or even would ask for and receive the cession of them. The prospect of a Franco-German war breaking out with the Italians siding with the latter and using the Balearics to make naval and air attacks on French troop convoys was considered to be highly undesirable by French decision-makers, and a major objective of French foreign policy in the late 1930s was to remove the Italians from the Balearics. Daladier was for continuing arms shipments to the Spanish Republicans as long as the Italian forces were in Spain, but Bonnet argued for ending arms supplies as a way of improving relations with Italy and even told Phipps that his country should "lay great stress with Daladier on the importance to the Pyrenees frontier remaining closed". It was Bonnet's hope that ending arms supplies for the Spanish Republic would be reciprocated by a total Italian withdraw from all Spanish territory, especially the Balearics. Bonnet was successful in having the frontier closed.

After reports from General Joseph Vuillemin of the French Air Force after a visit to Germany about the strength of the Luftwaffe and a memo from André François-Poncet, the French Ambassador to Germany, on 18 August 1938 stating that it was quite likely that Adolf Hitler planned to attack Czechoslovakia sometime soon, Bonnet began quite insistent for sending a joint Anglo-French warning sent to Berlin against plans to invade Czechoslovakia. On 22 August 1938, Bonnet had Charles Corbin, the French Ambassador in London, press for an explicit British commitment to come to France's side in the event of war breaking out in Central Europe and use the ensuing British refusal as a reason to justify France's lack of intervention in a possible German-Czechoslovak conflict. In August 1938, Bonnet started to become hostile towards what he felt was Daladier's excessive belligerence and lack of willingness to compromise with the Germans and often urged in private for Daladier to change his stance.

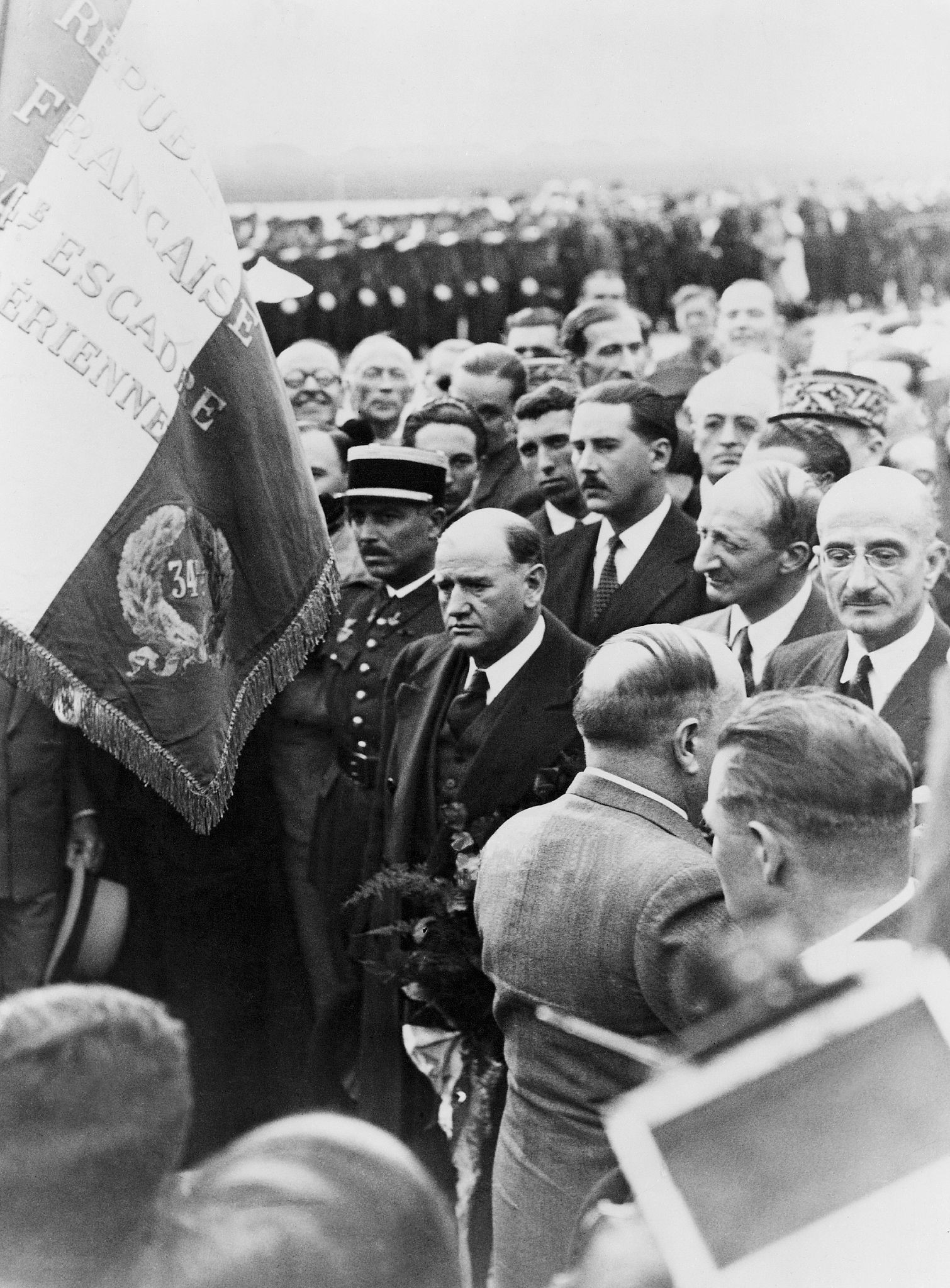
Bonnet standing behind Daladier to his right, 30 September 1938

On 9 August 1938, Welczeck reported to Berlin that Bonnet had told him earlier that day that "we [the French] would have to go to the extreme limits of compromise in the Sudeten German question, even though this did not suit the Czechs". On 12 August, Bonnet, in a memo to Daladier, attacked Beneš for proposing to increase the length of military service in Czechoslovakia to three years, which he warned would offend Hitler. In the same memo, Bonnet warned against staff talks among the general staffs of France, Czechoslovakia and the Soviet Union as likely to offend Germany. Bonnet, however, went on to recommend informal contacts via the French military and air attaches in Moscow to find out what forces the Soviets planned to send to Czechoslovakia and finally to learn the answer to the long-sought question: the precise route that the Red Army planned to take on its way to Czechoslovakia. Bonnet promised also to use the influence of the Quai d'Orsay to bring in the general staffs of Poland and Romania. Only at the end would Bonnet reveal what Thomas called the "sting in the tail": he also planned to keep the British government fully informed and knew very well that the Chamberlain government would object to even the limited informal talks that the memo had just proposed. In early September 1938, as part of his effort to prevent war by a mixture of threat and conciliation, Bonnet had a series of meetings with Welczeck and told him that France would honour the terms of the Franco-Czechoslovak treaty if the Germans invaded Czechoslovakia but insisted that his government was quite open to a compromise solution.

On 2 September 1938, Bonnet informed Welczeck, "France was definitely going to stand by its commitments". However, Welczeck also wrote that Bonnet had told him that "after a repetition of the general peace talk, which I have often heard from him, he added that... he himself, Daladier and other members of the cabinet were sincere admirers of the Führer... he, Bonnet, wished for nothing more ardently than to see the Führer in Paris as the guest of the French government.... In the present situation, he wanted to leave no room for doubt that France and Britain at her side, were firmly resolved to hasten to the assistance of the Czechs if they were attacked by German troops.... In France and Britain, however, nothing was so ardently desired as peace...we could depend upon it, that the Czechoslovak government would be forced to accept Runciman's verdict, which in all probability would mean the fulfilment of 70, 80 or 90 percent of the Sudeten German demands". Welczeck consistently portrayed Bonnet in his reports as a man who did not want to honour France's alliances with Czechoslovakia in 1938 and Poland in 1939.

During a speech delivered on 4 September 1938 at the unveiling of a commemorative plaque at Pointe de Grave honouring La Fayette's departure to America in 1777 and the arrival of the American Expeditionary Force in 1917, Bonnet stated obliquely that France would go to war if Germany attacked Czechoslovakia and expressed the hope that the US would fight on France's side. During the same ceremony, Bullitt stated that "France and the United States were united in war and peace", which led to a storm of criticism by American isolationists and to a statement from President Franklin D. Roosevelt that it was "100 per cent wrong" the US would join a "stop-Hitler bloc". Roosevelt's statement had the effect of confirming Bonnet in his course of seeking to avoid a war with Germany. In addition, a highly exaggerated estimate of the strength of the Luftwaffe presented by Charles Lindbergh in August 1938, supplemented by a highly-negative assessment of the ability of the French Air Force by Vuillemin to survive a war, had the effect of reinforcing Bonnet's determination to avoid a war with Germany.

When it appeared quite likely in mid-September 1938 that war could break out at any moment in Central Europe after Hitler's violent speech blasting Czechoslovakia on 12 September and a failed revolt in the Sudetenland, Bonnet become quite frantic in his efforts to save the peace. Bonnet told Phipps, "I repeated all this with emotion to Sir Eric Phipps telling him that at no price should we allow ourselves to be involved in war without having weighted all the consequences and without having measured in particular the state of our military forces". On 14 September, Bonnet told Phipps, "We cannot sacrifice ten million men in order to prevent three and half million Sudetens joining the Reich". Bonnet went on to advocate as his preferred solution to the crisis the neutralization of Czechoslovakia with wide-ranging autonomy for the Sudetenland, but he was prepared as a "last resort" to accept a plebiscite on the Sudetenlanders joining Germany. During the same conversation, Bonnet "expressed great indignation with the Czechs who, it seems, mean to mobilise without consulting the French... he has therefore given a broad hint to Beneš that France may have to reconsider her obligations" and that "we are not ready for war and we must therefore make the most far-reaching concessions to the Sudetens and to Germany". At a summit meeting in London with the leading British ministers on 18 September, Bonnet and Daladier agreed formally to the idea of ceding the Sudetenland to Germany but pressed strongly as the price for making such a concession a British guarantee of the remainder of Czechoslovakia.

On his return to Paris, in a meeting with the Czechoslovak minister to France, Štefan Osuský, Bonnet was very vehement for Prague to agree at once to the Anglo-French plan that had been agreed to in London. In a letter to Daladier on 24 September 1938, Bonnet wrote, "If France declared war against Germany, her position would be weaker than at any time since 1919. In fact, France in this case would have to stand alone on land the force of the combined German and Italian armies, without counting Japan, which in the Far East, will doubtless attack Indo-China.... For five months, night and day, in the course of our confident collaboration, we have struggled for peace. I beg you to continue in this course. It is the only one which can save the country". At the same time, Bonnet's relations with René Massigli, the Quai d'Orsay's Political Director, began to deteriorate quite rapidly, as Massigli felt that Bonnet was too anxious to avoid a war at any price.

On 25 September, Daladier and Bonnet returned to London for another set of meetings with Chamberlain and Halifax. During the summit, Bonnet said almost nothing. The man Bonnet most feared in September 1938 was Litvinov, who he was convinced would make an offer of Soviet support, which would ensure that Beneš rejected the Anglo-French peace plan that just been imposed on him. That, in turn, would lead to Germany invading Czechoslovakia. When Britain rejected Hitler's Bad Godesberg ultimatum on 26 September, Bonnet sought to prevent the news of the British rejection appearing in the French press, as it now appeared that British were pushing the French towards war and depriving him of using British pressure as an excuse. As the crisis reached its climax in late September 1938, Bonnet called upon his "peace lobby", a collection of various politicians, journalists and industrialists to pressure the Cabinet against going to war for Czechoslovakia. Some of the prominent members of Bonnet's "peace lobby" were the politicians Jean Mistler, Henri Bérenger, Jean Montigny, Anatole de Monzie, François Piétri, Lucien Lamoureux, and Joseph Caillaux; the industrialist Marcel Boussac; and the journalists Jacques Sauerwein, Emile Roche, Léon Bassée, and Emmanuel Berl. Together with Bonnet, the "peace lobby" sought to influence the government both within the corridors of power and by appealing to public opinion. In that regard, Bonnet especially valued the contribution of his close friend Bassée, who served as the political director of the Havas news agency. Another unofficial member of the "peace lobby" was Phipps, whose dispatches to London often reflected Bonnet's influence. The most celebrated of Phipps's dispatches was a message on 24 September 1938 that claimed that "all that is best in France is against war, almost at any price" and that they were opposed by a "small, but noisy and corrupt, war group".

In the aftermath of the British rejection of the Bad Godesberg ultimatum, Daladier stated at a Cabinet meeting that if Hitler persisted with the terms of the ultimatum, France "intended to go to war". At a Cabinet meeting on 27 September, Bonnet spoke out against French mobilisation and threatened to resign if the Cabinet ordered such a step. The atmosphere at the Cabinet meeting was very tense, as Daladier insisted upon mobilisation, which led to many heated words between him and Bonnet. At the cabinet meeting of 27 September, Bonnet's case was greatly helped by the report of Vuillemin, who stated that most of the aircraft of the French Air Force were obsolete and that in the event of war, 40% of all French aircraft would be destroyed within the first month and 64% in the first two months. Bonnet used Vuillemin's report at a cabinet meeting on 27 September with great effect, and two hours after the meeting, Daladier agreed with him that France must avoid a war at almost any cost.

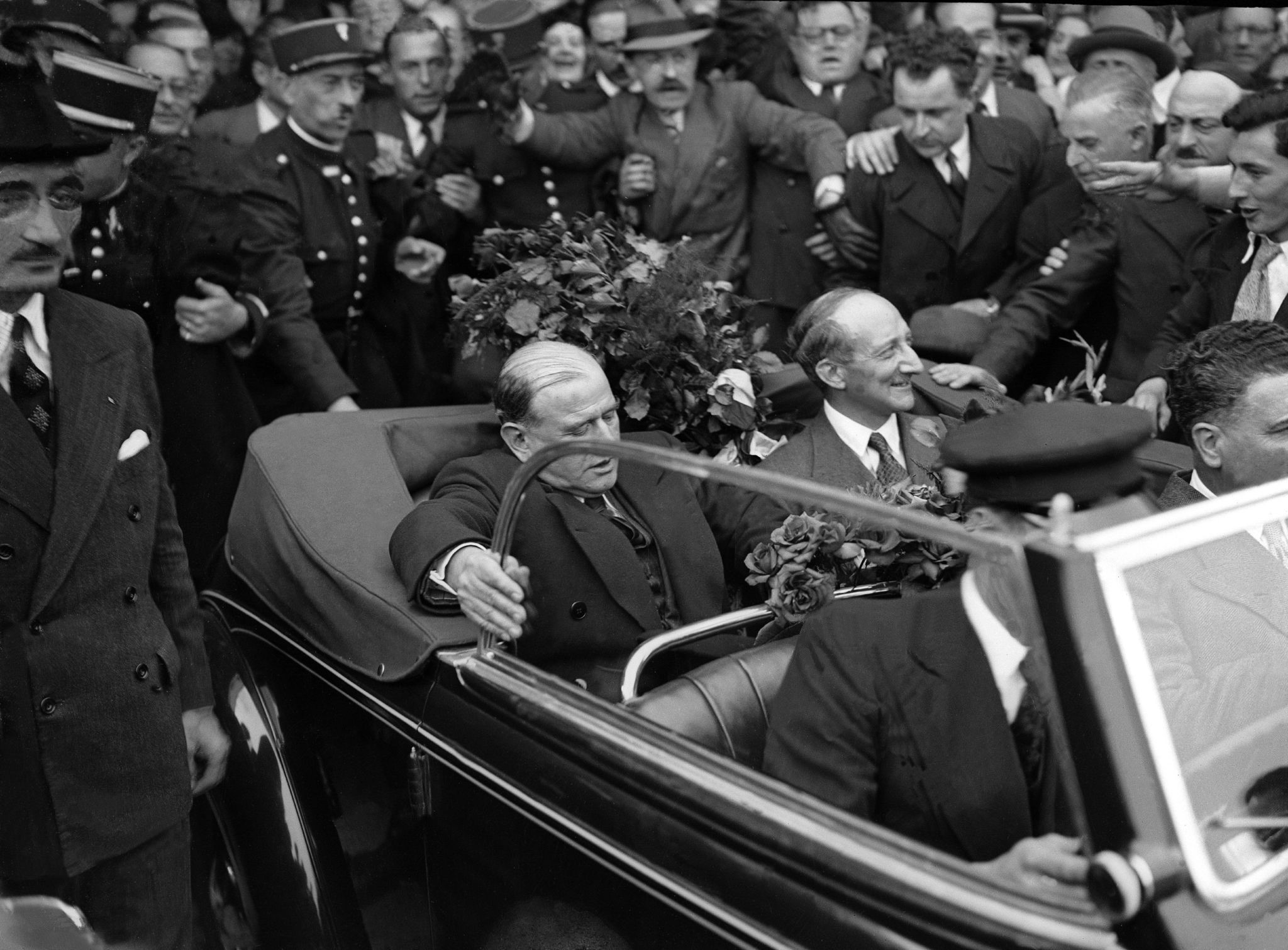
Bonnet with Daladier upon the latter's return from Munich, 30 September 1938

The crisis was suddenly averted on 28 September, when Chamberlain announced in the House of Commons that he had received an invitation from Benito Mussolini for a four-power conference to be held on 30 September in Munich to settle the crisis. Bonnet was very much for of the Munich Conference of 30 September, which averted the war that he opposed, but he was not part of the French delegation to the Munich Conference as Daladier was afraid of what Bonnet might do if he attended it.

After the Munich Conference, Bonnet visited his hometown of Périgueux, where he was greeted with a deluge of flowers and shouts of Vive Bonnet! and Merci Bonnet! Bonnet, who long been opposed to the Radical Socialists taking part in the Popular Front, used the communist demonstrations against the Munich Agreement as an argument for pulling the Radicals out of the Popular Front. He saw France as primarily as a "Mediterranean" nation, which should not be involved in Eastern Europe, and believed that the Munich Agreement was the beginning of a disengagement from Eastern Europe, which would allow France to focus on its colonial empire and its interests in the Mediterranean.

=== From Munich to Prague ===
Relations between Bonnet and his officials at the Quai d'Orsay, especially Massigli, were very poor, which led to Bonnet to condemn Massigli quite strongly in his memoirs. In turn, Massigli accused Bonnet of seeking to alter the documentary record in his favour by falsifying and burning documents. In the aftermath of Munich, relations between Bonnet and Massigli, which had already been poor, declined even further. On 24 October 1938, Bonnet had Massigli sacked as the Quai d'Orsay's Political Director and exiled him by having him serve as Ambassador to Turkey. Massiglii first learnt that Bonnet had fired him by reading his morning newspaper.

On the same day that Massigli was exiled, Pierre Comert, the Director of the Quai d'Orsay's Press Service, whose news releases during the Czechoslovak crisis were not in accord with the line that Bonnet wanted to hear, was sent off to the American department. Bonnet had also wanted to sack the Quai d'Orsay's Secretary-General Alexis Saint-Legér Léger and replace him with a man more in tune with his policies, but Saint-Legér Léger's increasing friendship with Daladier served to protect him. A popular legend has it that Saint-Legér Léger was not fired because he knew too much about stock market speculations that Bonnet was alleged to have engaged in during the war crisis of September 1938, but there is no evidence to support that story. In the aftermath of the purge, Bonnet was congratulated by Phipps for removing the "warmongers" Massigli and Comert from the Quai d'Orsay, but Phipps went on to complain that the "warmonger" Saint-Legér Léger should have been sacked as well. In response, Bonnet claimed that he and Saint-Legér Léger saw "eye to eye", which led to Phipps, who knew about the true state of relations between them, to remark drily that "in that case the eyes must be astigmatic". On 2 October 1938 former British Cabinet Secretary Sir Maurice Hankey wrote in his diary about the recent visit to Paris by the anti-appeasement Conservative MPs Winston Churchill and Edward Spears to contact anti-appeasement politicians in France: "Winston Churchill's sudden visit to France by aeroplane, accompanied by General Spears, and his visit only to the members of the French government like Mandel, who is opposed to the policy of peace, was most improper-Bonnet, the French Foreign Minister has complained about it, asking what we would say if our prominent French statesmen did the same: he has also protested against being rung up by Churchill and Spears from London for information". On 12 October 1938, Bonnet told Phipps that he envisioned "some revision of France's engagements towards Russia and Poland".

On 19 October 1938, at the last meeting between the French ambassador to Germany, André François-Poncet, who just been appointed ambassador to Italy, and Adolf Hitler, the former had suggested to the latter that a Franco-German Declaration of Friendship might offer a way of improving relations between the two countries and avoiding a repeat of the crisis of September 1938. When François-Poncet reported to Paris Hitler's favourable attitude towards such a declaration and his willingness to send Foreign Minister Joachim von Ribbentrop to Paris to sign the proposed declaration, Bonnet enthusiastically embraced the idea and felt that such a declaration might open the way for a series of economic and cultural agreements that would end forever the prospect of another Franco-German war. Bonnet was also jealous over the Anglo-German Declaration of 30 September, which Chamberlain had forced upon Hitler after the Munich Conference and wanted his own declaration.

In October 1938, the French opened secret talks with the Americans with the aim of buying American aircraft to make up productivity deficiencies in the French aircraft industry. Daladier commented in a message to Roosevelt: "If I had three or four thousand aircraft Munich would never have happened". The major problems in the Franco-American talks were the issue of how the French were to pay for the American aircraft and the implications of American Neutrality Acts about such sales. An even greater problem was that the American Johnson Act forbade loans to nations that had defaulted on their debts to the United States, which the French had done in 1932 by ceasing to repay the loans that they had contracted during the First World War, which made it impossible for American banks to lend money to pay for the American aircraft. In February 1939, the French offered to cede their possessions in the Caribbean and the Pacific to the United States, together with a lump sum payment of ten billion francs, in exchange for the ability to access loans from American banks to buy American aircraft.

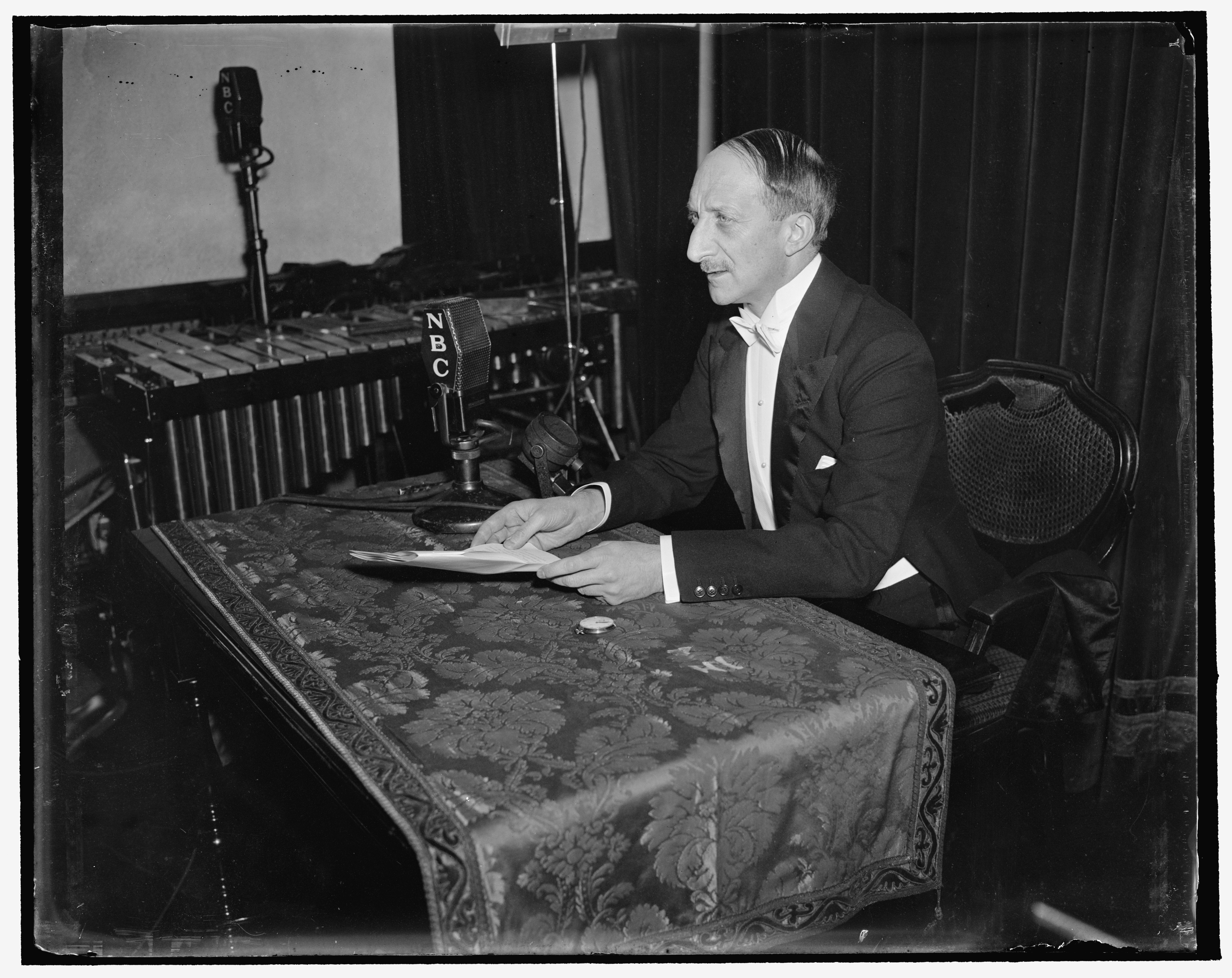
Bonnet in the United States 11 March 1937

In October 1938, Bonnet became increasingly preoccupied with the subject of Jewish refugees from Germany who were arriving in France in increasing numbers, and sought a "friendly settlement" with Germany. In November 1938, Chamberlain and Halifax visited Paris, where Bonnet told them that he was "much preoccupied with the question of Jewish immigration into France". Bonnet stated that although France had accepted 40,000 Jewish refugees, "France could not a stand a Jewish immigration on a large scale. She was already saturated with foreigners, of whom there were about 3 million in the country". Bonnet complained that the United States, by far the favourite destination of Jewish refugees, was unwilling to change its immigration quotas, which left him with two alternatives: to send Jewish refugees to one of the European colonies in Africa and/or for Germany to permit Jews to emigrate "normally". The last statement was a reference to the practice of the Reich government of asset-stripping German Jews of almost everything that they owned as the condition for leaving Germany, which led Bonnet to comment that it "would greatly facilitate matters" if Jewish refugees ceased to arrive in France penniless.

On 31 October 1938, Bonnet informed Welczeck that he wanted to see the German draft of the Declaration of Franco-German Friendship in the near future, as he wanted to sign the declaration before the end of 1938. Bonnet warned Welczeck that the French people had celebrated the Munich Agreement, which prevented a world war in 1938, but French public opinion was turning against the Munich Agreement with the feeling being that France had sacrificed too much in exchange for nothing in return. Bonnet expressed his concerns about the declaration being signed before the coming visit of Chamberlain to Paris on 24 November 1938 and stated that he wanted to avoid the impression that "the agreement had been made under British tutelage". On 8 November 1938, Welczeck informed Bonnet that Ribbentrop did not share his fears about Chamberlain's visit and that signing the declaration was not viewed as an especially-urgent matter in Berlin.

Throughout his career, Bonnet was widely respected for his intelligence but often inspired great mistrust in others, in part because of his highly secretive methods of working and his preference for verbal, as opposed to written, instructions. During his time as Foreign Minister, Bonnet was distrusted by the British, Daladier and senior officials in the Quai d'Orsay, all of whom suspected that he was in some way not quite being honest with them. Neville Chamberlain described Bonnet as "clever, but ambitious and an intriguer". Colonies minister Georges Mandel said, "His long nose sniffs danger and responsibility from afar. He will hide under any flat stone to avoid it". The anti-appeasement French political columnist André Géraud, who wrote under the pen-name Pertinax, stated that Bonnet pursued only the line "of least resistance". Winston Churchill described him as "the quintessence of defeatism". In December 1938, Lord Halifax's private secretary, Oliver Harvey, referred to Bonnet as "a public danger to his own country and to ours". In December 1939, British Chief Diplomatic Advisor Robert Vansittart wrote: "As to M. Bonnet he had better trust to time and oblivion rather than to coloured self-defence. He did a lot of really dirty work in 1938... if I ever had to play cards with M. Bonnet again I would always run through the pack first, just to make sure that the joker had been duly removed". Throughout Berlin Diary, the author William L. Shirer referred to him as "the insufferable Georges Bonnet".

Others were more sympathetic to Bonnet. Lord Halifax wrote in response to Vansittart's memo: "I am disposed to think but I know it is a minority view that M. Bonnet is not so black (or so yellow) as he is often painted". Joseph Paul-Boncour, a political opponent of Bonnet and his predecessor as foreign minister, spoke of his great "kindness and help". The editor of Le Petit Parisien newspaper, Élie J. Bois, felt that Bonnet had "the makings of a good, perhaps a great, foreign minister". On another occasion, Bois, who disliked Bonnet, wrote of Bonnet's "features...instinct with the intelligence of a fox on the alert". Bonnet's friend, Public Works Minister Anatole de Monzie commented, "Whilst very courageous in the long run, he is much less so in the heat of the moment.... Because he is reticent, he is accused of lying or of deceit. False accusation.... Bonnet is discreet so that his policy may be successful.... There is in him an obvious ability, an excessive flexibility. He jumps too quickly, on to the bandwagon, on to all bandwagons. What does it matter to me?... If he aims for the goal and means to reach it by devious means, I care only for the goal. Now I note that having adopted the peace party, he is sticking to it with all the foresight of a statesman". The French historian Yvon Lacaze has argued against the popular image of Bonnet as a slick and amoral opportunist and instead attributes Bonnet's views about avoiding another war with Germany to his memories of service in the trenches of the First World War .

In the fall of 1938, Bonnet started to advocate the ending of the French alliance system in Eastern Europe and ordered his officials at the Quai d'Orsay to start preparing grounds for renouncing the French treaties with the Soviet Union and Poland. Speaking before the Foreign Affairs Commission on the Chamber of Deputies in October 1938, Bonnet spoke of his desire to "restructure" the French alliance system in Eastern Europe and of his wish to "renegotiate" treaties that might bring France into a war "when French security is not directly threatened". In his efforts to end the eastern alliances, Bonnet found his hands tied by opposition from other members of the French government. As he noted during talks in October with a group of Deputies that had formally asked the Foreign Minister to end French commitments in Eastern Europe, "If I was free, I would carry out your policy; but I am not: I would have against me the majority of the Cabinet, led by Reynaud and Mandel, and I cannot count on Daladier, for Gamelin believes that in the event of war Polish military assistance would be indispensable". As part of his general tendency towards seeking to weaken the eastern alliances, Bonnet did his best to put off giving the international guarantee to Czecho-Slovakia that France had promised during the Munich Agreement. On 24 November during Chamberlain's visit to Paris, Bonnet deprecated the Franco-Soviet alliance, which he dismissed as being inconsequential; they were in agreement that the alliance would not be activated in the event of a German-sponsored movement for independence of Ukraine from Soviet Union, provided that German troops were not involved.

On 25 November 1938, Bonnet informed the French Ambassador to Poland, Léon Noël, that France should find an excuse for terminating the 1921 Franco-Polish alliance, but found that his views on that issue created considerable opposition within the Quai d'Orsay, which was argued that Poland was too valuable an ally to be abandoned, and if France renounced the Polish alliance, Warsaw would align herself with Berlin. On 30 November 1938, there were what were very misleadingly described as "spontaneous" demonstrations in the Italian Chamber of Deputies, which had been organised by Benito Mussolini and his Foreign Minister, Count Galeazzo Ciano, who demanded that France cede Tunisia, Corsica, Nice, and French Somaliland (now Djibouti) to Italy. At the cue call, all of the fascist deputies rose up to scream abuse at France, which Ciano sought to explain away as merely an expression of the "spontaneous" rage felt by the Italian people over the French "occupation" of the lands that he insisted rightfully belonged to Italy. Mussolini believed in the aftermath of the Munich Agreement that France was no longer a great power, and now was the time to pursue Italian irredentist ambitions against France. In response, Bonnet sent out a message to François-Poncet, who was now the French Ambassador in Rome, to inform him that he should see Count Ciano to complain, "Such behaviour may appear rather unusual in the presence of the French Ambassador and immediately following the unconditional recognition of the Italian Empire". That was in reference to the French recognition of the annexation of Ethiopia.

In December 1938, during the visit of German Foreign Minister Joachim von Ribbentrop to Paris to sign the largely-meaningless Franco-German Declaration of Friendship, Ribbentrop had conversations with Bonnet that he later claimed included a promise to him that France would recognise all of Eastern Europe as Germany's exclusive sphere of influence. Ribbentrop was to use Bonnet's statement to convince Hitler that France would not go to war to defend Poland in 1939. Both Bonnet and Saint-Legér Léger were quite vehement in insisting that no such remark had ever been made. Bonnet spent much of 6–7 December 1938 talking to Ribbentrop about the need for a "solution to the Jewish problem", by which he meant shipping Jewish refugees to the French colony of Madagascar. On 15 December 1938, Bonnet gave his account of his meeting with Ribbentrop at the Hôtel Crillon on 7 December 1938 to Edwin C. Wilson, the counsellor of the American embassy, in which he mentioned no moral objections to Nazi policies and instead asked for Germany to be "more reasonable". The Canadian historian Michael Marrus and the American historian Robert O. Paxton wrote, "On the subject of Madagascar, Bonnet's postwar version is entirely misleading".

In January 1939, Bonnet commissioned a study for the French Cabinet that concluded that the 1935 Franco-Soviet alliance was now defunct, and there were no grounds for hope about help from the Soviet Union. Rumours in the French press over the winter of 1938–1939 that France was seeking the end of the eastern alliances generated concerns both in the Chamber of Deputies and in the press, which led Bonnet to state in a speech to the Chamber on 26 January 1939: "So, gentlemen, let us dispose of the legend that our policy has destroyed the engagements that we have contracted in Eastern Europe with the USSR and with Poland. These engagements remain in force and they must be applied in the same spirit in which they were conceived". In response to Bonnet's speech, Ribbentrop summoned the French Ambassador to Germany, Robert Coulondre, on 6 February 1939 to offer a formal protest over his speech. Ribbentrop told Coulondre that because of Bonnet's statement of 6 December 1938 accepting Eastern Europe as Germany's zone of influence meant that "France's commitments in Eastern Europe" were now "off limits", a claim that stunned Coulondre.

Besides seeking to end the cordon sanitaire, Bonnet's major initiative in foreign policy after Munich was a series of economic agreements that he sought to negotiate with the Germans. Bonnet's economic diplomacy was intended to achieve four goals:

- He wanted to end the Great Depression in France;
- Like many other appeasers on both sides of the Channel, Bonnet believed that German foreign policy was driven by economic grievances, not by Nazi racial theories about Lebensraum, which Bonnet considered far-fetched, as he felt that the Nazis did not take their ideology seriously. Thus, in Bonnet's view, arrangements to offer Germany greater prosperity would tame German complaints against the existing international order and reduce international tensions.
- Like other economic experts around the world in the 1930s, Bonnet was disturbed by the implications of the increasing tendency in Germany towards protectionism, currency manipulation, use of "blocked accounts" for foreign businesses in Germany and foreign-holders of German debt, autarky, a growing statism in the German economy and the Germans' drive to create their own economic zone in Europe since he felt that Franco-German economic agreements would at least ensure that France would not be locked out of the German economic sphere of influence and even moderate some of the most worrisome German economic practices.
- He wanted a Franco-German friendship that would both banish the prospect of another war and end the arms race that had placed such a burden on the French economy.

However, during the winter of 1938–1939, negotiations with the Germans proceeded slowly, in large part because the Germans refused to abandon the economic policies that caused such concern. The atmosphere, following the German destruction of Czecho-Slovakia (as Czechoslovakia had been renamed), on 15 March 1939 was not considered conducive for France to be pursuing any sort of agreements with the Germans, and the talks were called off, never to be resumed. At the same time, Bonnet ordered Charles Corbin, the French Ambassador in London, to warn Chamberlain and Lord Halifax during their scheduled visit to Rome in January 1939 against any weakening of Anglo-French relations in exchange for improved Anglo-Italian relations. During a meeting between François-Poncet and Count Ciano, the latter claimed that the anti-French demonstrations were purely "spontaneous" and did not reflect the views of his government. As part of an effort to gain British support against the Italian campaign, Bonnet issued a statement that France would always rush to Britain's aid in the event of aggression, in the hope that his statement might lead to a similar British statement of support for France. In January 1939, a pro-appeasement British newspaper proprietor, Kenneth de Courcy, reported after a visit to Paris: "Monsieur Bonnet seems to be generally distrusted by most Frenchmen of the centre and right". However, the fiercest criticism of Bonnet came from the French left, which saw him as a someone who was all too willing to make deals with fascist regimes.

In early January 1939, Bonnet and Daladier approved of the idea of sending the banker Paul Baudoin as an unofficial diplomat to find out just what exactly the Italians wanted from France. The reasoning for the Baudoin mission was if the price of Italian friendship was not too expensive, it might be worth paying as a way of detaching Italy from Germany and thus reducing France's potential enemies. When Baudoin visited Rome in February 1939, he reported that the Italians were asking only for some economic concessions from the French in the Horn of Africa and Italian representation on the board of the Suez Canal Company. However, before any decisions were made in Paris about accepting the Italian demands, the news of Baudoin's secret visit was leaked to the French press, which forced Bonnet to disavow him. In response to furious complaints from François-Poncet about Baudoin's mission, which he had first learned about after the story had been leaked, Bonnet replied to François-Poncet, "The rumours you are telling me have no basis in fact. You are fully aware that any conversation, any Franco-Italian negotiation official or unofficial could only be handled by you, and that no direct or indirect transaction could be considered outside your purview".

In January 1939, negotiations were opened between France and Turkey over resolving the Hatay dispute. Leading the French delegation were Gabriel Puaux, the High Commissioner of Syria and Massigli, the French Ambassador in Ankara. The continuing feud between Massigli and Bonnet was reflected in Bonnet's habit of refusing Massigli negotiating instructions for weeks on end to place Massigli in an embarrassing situation during his talks with the Turks. During the Franco-Turkish talks, Bonnet had first backed Puaux against any weakening of French control over the Sanjak of Alexandretta before he decided to settle the dispute in favour of the Turks as a way of potentially winning Turkish support in the event of a war with Germany. Despite efforts to maintain some sort of French presence in Alexandretta, the Franco-Turkish talks were to end in June 1939 with the Turks being given total control over the disputed region.

By early 1939, it was clear that the days of the Spanish Republic were numbered, and Bonnet felt that it was time for France to recognise the Spanish Nationalists as the legitimate government of Spain (Paris had recognised the Republican government as the legitimate government). On 20 January 1939, Bonnet had a meeting with the former president of Mexico, Francisco León de la Barra, who was living in exile in Paris, and asked him to serve as an unofficial French diplomat in talks with the Spanish Nationalists. In response to reports from de la Barra that ties between General Francisco Franco and the Axis powers were strained, Bonnet then sent out Senator Léon Bérard to sound out the Nationalists about establishing diplomatic relations.

Bonnet told Bérard to inform General Francisco Gómez-Jordana Sousa, the Nationalist Foreign Minister, that if Franco was willing to promise that all German and Italian forces were to be withdrawn after the end of the Spanish Civil War, Paris would recognise the Nationalists. The major disputes during the talks between Bérard and Jourdana were if the recognition of the Burgos government would be de jure, as Franco wanted, or de facto, as Bonnet wanted, and if Franco would promise to remain neutral in a Franco-German war. However, by February 1939, Bonnet believed that the rapid collapse of the Republican war effort made recognition of the Burgos government imperative if France had any hope of having influence with Franco, and on 28 February 1939, France had broken diplomatic relations with the Republican government in Madrid and recognised the Nationalist government in Burgos. Much to the relief of Bonnet, Franco kept his word about ensuring the withdrawal of Axis forces from Spanish territory, especially the departure of the Italians from the Balearic Islands.

In early 1939, the British Embassy in Paris was bombarded with a series of reports that public opinion in France was highly dejected and demoralised and that unless Britain made the "continental commitment" of unequivocally linking British security to French security and committing to sending a large British Expeditionary Force to France like the one that had ultimately been sent during the First World War, the French would resign themselves to becoming a German satellite state. Those reports, which had secretly originated with the French government, hoped to pressure the British into making the long-sought "continental commitment". The French were assisted in a conspiracy of convenience by the leadership of the British Army, which disliked the funding implications of Chamberlain's "limited liability" doctrine that held that during the next war, British efforts were to be largely limited to the sea and the air, with the army playing an ancillary role at best.

On 24 January 1939, Bonnet informed Welczeck that a speech that he was going to make before the Chamber of Deputies to affirm France's willingness to stand by its alliances in Eastern Europe "had been framed for domestic consumption". Bonnet read out to Welczeck several excerpts from the speech he was going to give and asked the ambassador to tell Ribbentrop not to take his speech literally. Despite Bonnet's efforts via Welczeck, Ribbentrop was enraged when he read the excerpts and ordered Welczeck to express Germany's "astonishment" that Bonnet had spoken of "fostering and extending French friendships in eastern and central Europe".

On 11 February 1939, Welczeck met with Bonnet. The French and German records of the meeting contradict each other. In the French version of the meeting, Bonnet defended the speech he gave before the Chamber of Deputies on 26 January 1939 while the German version of the meeting Bonnet apologized for the speech, saying that it did not reflect his views on foreign policy at all. Welczeck had Bonnet saying to him: "Things were often said during a foreign affairs debate, which were obviously designed for domestic consumption.... If a French foreign minister, against the storm and wave of opposition, substantiated our claims to the Sudeten German territory... and then drew his own conclusions privately from the changed situation in Central Europe, he could not be expected to withdraw all along the line when facing the Chamber."

The French effort for a British "continental commitment" was given a huge and unexpected boost by the "Dutch war scare" of January 1939. In response to the "Dutch war scare", which gripped London in late January 1939 when the British government received false reports of an imminent German invasion of the Netherlands, Lord Halifax had Phipps inquire what France would do if such an invasion took place. The Germans were then believed to have planned to overrun the Netherlands and to use Dutch airfields to launch a bombing campaign that would be meant to achieve a knockout blow against Britain and to raze British cities to the ground. The French attitude towards a German invasion of the Netherlands was crucial because France was the only country in Western Europe that possessed an army large enough and modern enough to save the Dutch.

Moreover, the importance of France to British security had increased after a violent anti-British propaganda campaign launched in Germany in November 1938, which had led the Chamberlain government to perceive German foreign policy as anti-British. That scare was combined with rumours that Bonnet was secretly attempting to negotiate a Franco-German "special relationship", which might leave Britain facing a hostile Germany without any allies with the large armies that Britain lacked. In response to Phipps's message, Bonnet had Corbin inform Lord Halifax that the French attitude towards German aggression towards the Netherlands would depend upon the British attitude towards France if the latter were the victim of aggression. Chamberlain stated to the House of Commons on 6 February 1939 that any German attack on France would automatically be considered an attack on Britain, which led the British to make the "continental commitment" to send a large army to defend France that successive French diplomats had struggled to obtain since 1919. In a newspaper column on 11 March 1939, Pertinax wrote that Bonnet ruled his ministry in an autocratic style. As he wrote: "In theory, foreign policy is conducted by the entire cabinet, the ministers being collectively responsible for their actions. In reality, the Minister of Foreign Affairs is absolute master of his department".

In March 1939, after the German destruction of the rump state of Czecho-Slovakia and the proclamation of the Protectorate of Bohemia and Moravia, Bonnet had Hervé Alphand of the Ministry of Commerce, who was in Berlin to negotiate a trade treaty, recalled in protest. The violation of the Munich Agreement badly damaged Bonnet's creditability, and as part of the aftermath, 17 French intellectuals sent out a letter that called for an inquiry into Bonnet's conduct of foreign affairs. Ties between Daladier and Bonnet were strained when in protest over the German coup, Daladier ordered the recall of Robert Coulondre, the French Ambassador to Germany, without consulting Bonnet, who was much offended by Daladier's act. Welczeck reported that Bonnet had told him that he had no official opinion about the occupation, but his "personal view" was that "the peace and appeasement policy of the 'men of Munich' had suffered a lamentable disaster... in every country warmongers who would lead Europe toward catastrophe were bound to gain the upper hand".

=== Danzig crisis and "peace front" ===
During the Tilea Affair of March 1939 in which the Romanian government, as part of an effort to enlist British support against German demands for the control of the Romanian oil industry, had the Romanian Minister in London, Viorel Tilea, make a series of highly-misleading statements to the British government to the effect that it was on the verge of an immediate German invasion, Bonnet happened to be in London as part of the company that was accompanying the state visit of President Albert Lebrun. The importance of Romania was that Germany possessed no oil of its own and was highly dependent on oil from the New World (the coal liquefaction plants that would supply Germany with oil during World War II were not yet in operation). As such, a naval blockade of Germany would have highly damaging effects on the German economy, and conversely, a German seizure of Romania would undermine the effectiveness of a blockade. When the war scare began on 18 March 1939, Bonnet's first response was to inform the Romanians that they should accept aid from the Soviet Union, as there was nothing France could do to save them. The Romanians rejected the French advice, and Jakob Suritz, the Soviet Ambassador to France, stated the Soviet Union would take no initiatives in resisting German aggression in Eastern Europe, and France must show the way.

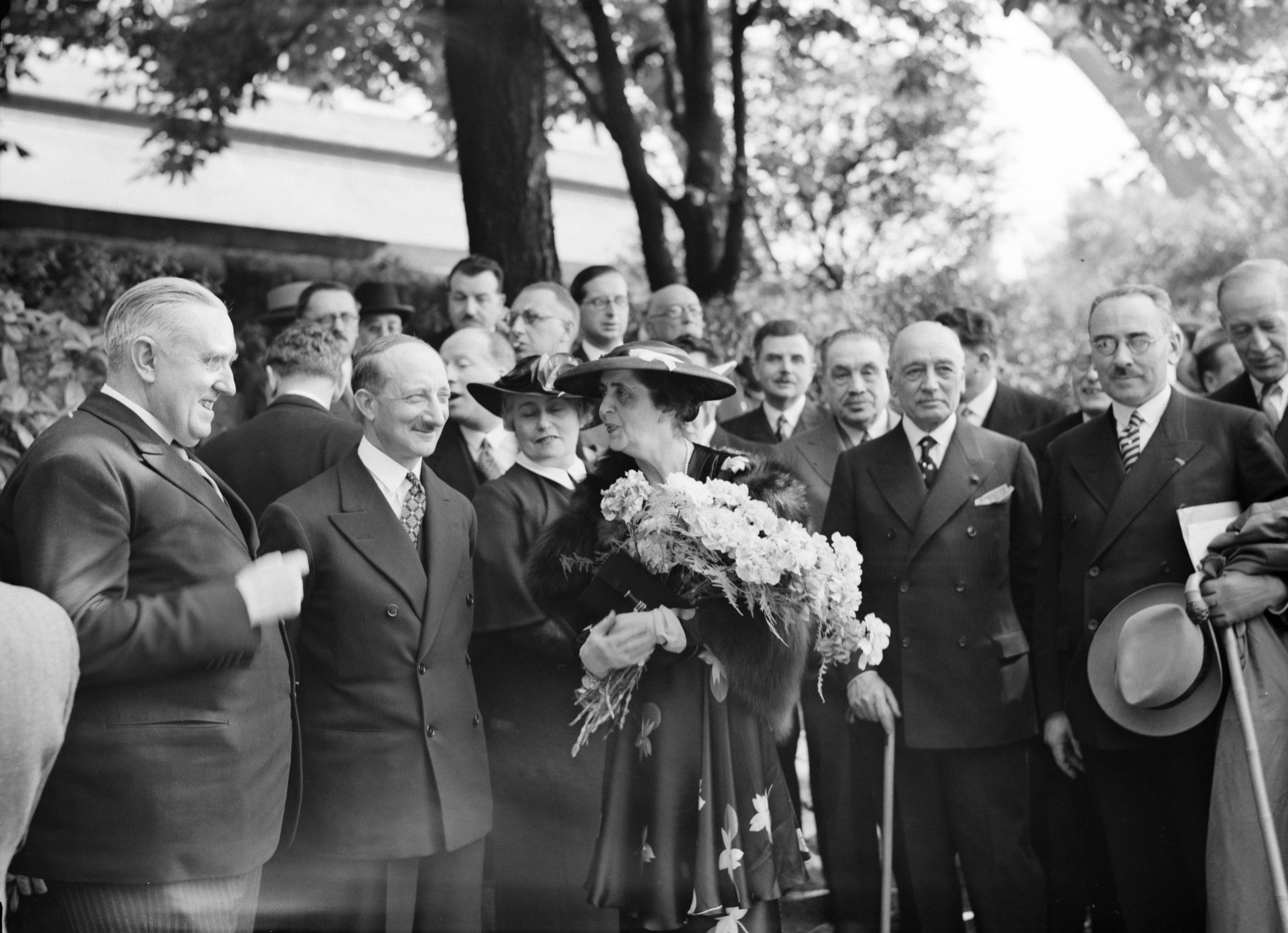
Georges Bonnet in the Netherlands, 1936

During an emergency meeting with Halifax on 20 March, Bonnet sought to shift responsibility to dealing with the crisis onto British shoulders and strongly suggested that the ideal country to save Romania and its oil was Poland. Bonnet argued that Britain should take the lead in persuading the Poles to come to Romania's aid and suggested that if Poland was involved, perhaps the Romanians might be persuaded to accept Soviet aid as well. Bonnet's reasons for arguing that Britain should take the lead in persuading Poland to come to Romania's aid were his fear that if France made such an effort, the price of Polish support would a tightening of the Franco-Polish alliance, which was against Bonnet's general policy of seeking to weaken France's eastern alliances.

On 23 March 1939, Lebrun was having lunch with the royal family at Windsor Castle when Bonnet had another meeting with Lord Halifax and mentioned that he had received a series of messages from François-Poncet. Bonnet claimed that it would create a highly negative impression on Mussolini and would hamper efforts to detach him from his alignment with Germany if Britain and France aligned themselves with only the Soviet Union. Bonnet's statement was to lead the British government into considering the idea of making a "guarantee" of Polish independence as the best way of securing Polish support for Romania. In that way, Bonnet played a major if indirect role in the progress leading to the British "guarantee" of Poland on 31 March 1939. On 30 March, Phipps told Bonnet that Chamberlain would be announcing the "guarantee" of Poland the next day and asked for Bonnet's approval, which was granted without Bonnet informing the rest of the French cabinet.

Daladier was enraged with Bonnet for giving his approval of the "guarantee", as he remarked to the French cabinet the next day: "the guarantee goes a long way, indeed further than our own alliance, because the decision to engage Britain's entire military strength will rest in Warsaw". With the British "guarantee", Daladier had lost leverage over Colonel Beck, who now had two great power allies, instead of one, and it soon dawned on Daladier that Bonnet had approved of the British "guarantee" as a way to sabotage Daladier's policy of restructuring the Franco-Polish alliance to confront the Reich. General Gamelin, likewise, complained that Chamberlain should have forced Beck to grant transit rights to the Red Army as a precondition of the "guarantee", instead of giving the "guarantee" unconditionally, which meant that both Britain and France had lost leverage over Colonel Beck. After the British "guarantee" of Polish independence on 31 March 1939, followed by the announcements that London wished to build a "peace front" to resist aggression in April 1939, Bonnet felt there was now a great opportunity of building an Anglo-French-Soviet combination, which might deter Germany from war.

On 14 April 1939, Bonnet had a meeting with Suritz and asked "in a form to be determined" for the Soviet Union to provide military support for Poland and Romania if they were attacked by Germany. Bonnet suggested to Surittz that an annex to the Franco-Soviet Pact of 1935 should be added to declare the Soviets would go to war if Germany attacked either Poland or Romania. In particular, Bonnet stated: "It was obvious that there had to be an agreement between the USSR and Romania or the USSR and Poland for the Franco-Soviet Pact to come usefully into play". Suritz commented that unless the Poles and Romanians allowed the Red Army transit rights, there was little that the Soviets could do for those nations, which led Bonnet to reply that he felt that he could pressure both nations into agreeing to provide the desired transit rights. Bonnet commented that he felt that it was time to "begin immediate discussions between France and the USSR in order to precisely determine the help the USSR could provide to Romania and Poland in the event of German aggression".

In April 1939, Bonnet in turn went behind Daladier's back in suggesting that Britain apply pressure on Daladier to make more concessions to Italy on the Franco-Italian disputes over influence in the Mediterranean and the Red Sea regions. The differences between Daladier and Bonnet over the question of making concessions to Italy, which Daladier firmly opposed, led Daladier increasingly to take control of foreign policy by dealing directly with the Quai d'Orsay's Secretary-General, Alexis Saint-Legér Léger, and pushing Bonnet aside from April 1939 onwards. On 27 April 1939, Phipps told Bonnet that the Chamberlain government had hopes that "a serious attempt would be made to reestablish contact between France and Italy". St. Legér was utterly opposed to Bonnet's policy of making concessions to Italy and had the support of Daladier, who felt that France should not have to make concessions to Mussolini. Later in April 1939, Daladier told Romanian Foreign Minister Grigore Gafencu that "he was going to get rid of Bonnet quite shortly". On 6 May, Daladier stated to Bullit that he had a great deal of "mistrust of Bonnet and said that he might replace him in the immediate future". As Welczeck noted in May 1939: "Bonnet was... a man who would go to the utmost limits to avoid a European war up to the last moment. He regretted therefore that foreign affairs were so much more in the hands of M. Daladier than M. Bonnet".

On 14 May 1939, the French chargé d'affaires at the consulate in Singapore warned Bonnet that France's only hope of preventing the Imperial Japanese Navy from dominating the South China Sea was the Royal Navy, as the bulk of the French fleet was concentrated in the Mediterranean Sea and the Atlantic Ocean. Admiral François Darlan, the commander-in-chief of the French Navy, had already declared that his force's primary mission was in the Mediterranean and that the South China Sea was only a secondary concern. The report warned that in the event of the Danzig crisis turning into a war, the Japanese would probably seek to dominate the South China Sea as a prelude towards the invasions of French Indochina and British Malaya, both of which were well provided with rubber plantations. Despite the report's recommendation that closer co-operation with Britain was the best way to protect French Indochina, Bonnet remained committed to the appeasement of Japan.

On 19 May 1939, Bonnet met with Welczeck, who told him that the Reich did not want a war against France and attacked Britain for an alleged "encirclement" policy against Germany. Welczeck went on to say that France would have to bear "the main burden of the struggle conjured up by Britain and make enormous sacrifice of life", as he claimed that France was being used by Britain. It was after that statement that the French and the German versions of the meeting diverged. The French version had Bonnet saying that France could not accept the use of force by Germany to resolve the Danzig crisis. The German version had Bonnet saying to Welczeck: "he [Bonnet] would never deviate from the main lines of his policy and would fight for peace to the very last. In spite of everything he held fast to the idea of bringing back co-operation with Germany.... If I met unfriendliness in the French press where he had some influence, he would remedy matters, as far as lay his power". During the Danzig crisis, Bonnet found himself opposed by almost all of the officials of the Quai d'Orsay, led by St. Léger, who accused him of wanting to end the alliance with Poland. Morale was high in the Quai d'Orsay, as one French diplomat, Jean Chauvel, recalled in 1971: "But finally and most important was their conviction that Hitler could not fight a war". Chauvel stated that he and the other officials worked to sabotage Bonnet's policies and wrote: "Their practical purpose was to resist the minister's policies and if necessary, thwart any action on his part".

In contrast to his enthusiasm for improving ties with Moscow as the Danzig crisis began, Bonnet felt the opposite about relations with Warsaw. In May 1939, during talks in Paris with the Poles aimed at strengthening the political and military aspects of the Franco-Polish alliance, Bonnet sabotaged the negotiations by bogging down the talks on the political accord on procedural details to ensure that no political accord was signed, which were the precondition for the military accords. (Not until 3 September 1939 would the political accord finally be signed). Bonnet sought to block the signing of the Franco-Polish political accord as a way of applying pressure on the Poles to grant the Soviets transit rights, because if the negotiations for the "grand alliance" failed, he did not wish to see France any more committed to Poland's defence.

During the ultimately-failed talks for an Anglo-Franco-Soviet alliance in the spring and summer of 1939, Bonnet and the rest of the French leadership pressed quite strongly for the revived Triple Entente, often to the considerable discomfort of the British. In the spring and the summer of 1939, Bonnet very strongly believed that a "grand alliance" of the Soviet Union, Britain and France would deter Germany from attacking Poland. At a meeting with Lord Halifax on 20–21 May 1939 while he was returning from Geneva, Daladier, Bonnet and Saint-Léger pressured Halifax repeatedly for a "grand alliance" as the only way of stopping another world war. In the spring of 1939, Bonnet went so far as to inform Moscow that he supported turning over all of eastern Poland to the Soviet Union, regardless of what the Poles felt about the issue, if that was to be the price of the Soviet alliance. On 2 June 1939, when the Soviet government offered up its definition of what constituted "aggression" upon which the intended alliance was to come into play, Bonnet sided with the Soviets against the British, who felt that the Soviet definition of "aggression", especially "indirect aggression", was too loose a definition and was phrased in such a manner as to imply the Soviet right of inference in the internal affairs of nations of Eastern Europe.

On 24 June 1939, Coulondre visited Paris to meet Bonnet. Coulondre complained that Bonnet's equivocal statements to Count Johannes von Welczeck about what France would do if Germany invaded Poland had convinced Ribbentrop that France would do nothing. Coulondre advised Bonnet to make an unequivocal statement to Welczeck that France would stand by its alliance with Poland if Germany invaded, which Bonnet ignored. In June 1939, a long war of words between Bonnet and Ribbentrop began in the summer of 1939 over just what precisely Bonnet actually said to Ribbentrop, who issued a statement to the French media stating that Bonnet had told him on 6 December 1938 that he recognised Eastern Europe as being the exclusive sphere of influence for the Reich. Adamthwaite wrote that all of the evidence supports Ribbentrop's version of events. Later in June 1939, Bonnet's reputation was badly damaged when the French agent of the Dienststelle Ribbentrop, Otto Abetz, was expelled from France for engaging in espionage, French newspaper editors were charged with receiving bribes from Abetz and the name of Bonnet's wife was prominently mentioned in connection with the Abetz case as a close friend of the two editors; but despite much lurid speculation in the French press at the time, there was no conclusive evidence linking Bonnet or his wife to German espionage or bribery. As Bonnet continued to ignore Coulondre's advice on making a firm statement to Welczeck, Coulondre appealed directly to Daladier in a phone call. Daladier, in turn, ordered Bonnet to make such a statement to Welczeck. On 1 July 1939, Bonnet told Welczeck that Germany should not try to unilaterally change the status of Danzig and that France would honour its alliance with Poland.

On 1 July 1939, in response to a message from Soviet Foreign Commissar Vyacheslav Molotov about the nations that the intended "grand alliance" was meant to protect, Bonnet sent a telegraph in reply to state that the purpose of the "grand alliance" was "the mutual solidarity of the three great powers... in those conditions the number of countries guaranteed is unimportant". Besides working for the "peace front" with Britain and the Soviet Union, Bonnet tried to enlist Turkey in the "peace front" in July 1939 by arranging for the French and the British treasuries to provide financial support to Ankara. By early July 1939, Bonnet grew increasingly irritated over what he regarded as British foot-dragging in the talks with the Soviets and the Polish refusal to grant transit rights to the Red Army. Bonnet wrote to Halifax at the time, "We are reaching a critical moment, where we find it necessary to do everything possible to succeed". As part of his effort to save the talks, Bonnet wrote up and presented to both London and Moscow the text of a joint communiqué, stating to the world their determination to resist aggression and that they "agreed on the main points of the political agreement". Bonnet's effort was blocked by Molotov, who stated that his government had no interest in issuing such a communiqué.

On 18 July 1939, Bonnet had a discussion with Daladier in which he stated that he felt that Hitler was serious about going to war with Poland, and Bonnet believed that the best solution would be for France to pressure Poland into allowing the Free City to "go home to the Reich" as the necessary price of peace. Bonnet also recommended having France pressure Poland into returning the Polish Corridor and Upper Silesia, neither of which Hitler had yet demanded. Bonnet's preferred solution to the Danzig crisis was an international conference, and he stated that had a long conversation with Sir Nevile Henderson, the British ambassador in Berlin, during his visit to Paris. Bonnet presented Henderson's views in a manner that implied that Henderson was speaking for London. Daladier very much opposed Bonnet's recommendations and stated that St. Léger had informed him that he was convinced that the Anglo-French-Soviet "peace front" would soon come into existence, which would deter Germany from war. Daladier expressed the view that Hitler was bluffing in his threats and would not choose war if he was confronted with overwhelming force. Bonnet was not as quite sanguine as Daladier was about the "peace front", as he noted the issue of transit rights for the Red Army across Poland still had to be resolved, but he agreed that the "peace front" was the best way of deterring Hitler from war.

In August 1939, Bonnet took up a Turkish effort of mediation between the British and the Soviets as part of an attempt to break the deadlock. On 2 August 1939, Bonnet told Phipps that his main opponents in the cabinet were Daladier, along with Paul Reynaud, the minister of finance; César Campinchi, the minister of the marine; Albert Sarraut, the minister of the interior; and Georges Mandel, the minister of colonies. Bonnet further maintained that his enemies within the Quai d'Orsay were St. Léger, along with his friends, Coulondre and Corbin.

When the Anglo-Franco-Soviet talks were on the verge of breaking down in August 1939 over the issue of transit rights for the Red Army in Poland, Bonnet instructed the French Embassy in Moscow to inform the Kremlin falsely that the Poles had granted the desired transit rights, as part of a desperate bid to rescue the alliance talks with the Soviets. At the same time, immense French diplomatic pressure was applied in Warsaw for the Poles to agree to the transit rights for the Red Army, but Polish Foreign Minister Józef Beck was very firm in refusing to consider such an idea. On 19 August 1939, Beck stated in a message to Paris: "We have not got a military agreement with the USSR. We do not want to have one". The conclusion of the Molotov–Ribbentrop Pact of 23 August 1939 left Bonnet highly dejected, as he believed the prospect of Soviet economic support for Germany would undermine the effectiveness of a British naval blockade of Germany, which was widely assumed in France to be a prerequisite of defeating Germany, and he returned to advocating renouncing the Polish alliance as the best way of avoiding war for France.

After the Non-Aggression Pact, Bonnet urged Daladier that the French should inform the Poles that they should give the Free City of Danzig to Germany, and if the Poles refused, the French should use that as an excuse to renounce the alliance with Poland. At a cabinet meeting on 22 August 1939, Bonnet spoke against French mobilisation and argued that France should seek to find a way to end the alliance with Poland. Bonnet supported by St. Léger-Léger and Daladier argued for making one more attempt to win the Soviet alliance. Reynaud and Mandel both spoke for French mobilisation, which Bonnet argued against and stated would increase Polish "intransigence". Bonnet's comment about French mobilization was "I do not ask for this".

At a meeting of the Standing Committee on National Defense, which comprised the Premier, the Ministers of War, the Navy, the Air and Foreign Affairs, and all of the top French military officials on 23 August 1939, Bonnet sought to pressure General Maurice Gamelin into stating that France could not go to war in 1939, as Bonnet maintained that France should find a way of renouncing the 1921 alliance with Poland. Bonnet argued that as Poland could be saved only by Soviet support, it was no longer possible for France to risk war because of the Non-Aggression Pact. Bonnet further asserted that oil-rich Romania, hemmed in by Germany and the Soviet Union, would now lean towards the totalitarian states and that the Soviets would not allow Turkey, which had been leaning in a pro-Allied direction, to enter the war if Germany attacked a state in the Balkans. At that meeting, Bonnet's arguments for abandoning Poland were countered by Gamelin, who argued that if war came, there was little France could do for the Poles, who Gamelin felt could hold out for about three months, but abandoning Poland would be equivalent to abandoning great power status for France. As Bonnet continued his efforts against going to war for Poland, Daladier increasingly came to feel that appointing Bonnet to the Quai d'Orsay had been a mistake and was now consumed with hatred for him. Juliusz Łukasiewicz, the Polish Ambassador to France, accused Bonnet of "preparing a new Munich behind our backs". On 25 August 1939, Daladier told Łukasiewicz that he should avoid speaking to Bonnet under all conditions and maintained that the views of the Foreign Minister regarding the Danzig crisis were not his own, and he advised Łukasiewicz to speak only to himself or St. Léger. On the evening of 27 August 1939, Coulondre wrote a letter to Daladier declaring: "One must hold firm, Hitler faced with force is a man who will climb down".

On the evening of 31 August 1939, at a meeting of the French cabinet, Bonnet was the leading spokesman for the idea of using the peace mediation proposals of Benito Mussolini as a pretext for ending the alliance with Poland. Before the cabinet meeting opened, Bonnet together his close ally, Public Works Minister Anatole de Monzie, sought to pressure some of the most hesitant hawks in the Cabinet such as Charles Pomaret, Henri Queuille and Jean Zay into endorsing Mussolini's offer. Zay was clearly torn, as he stated that he hated the idea of another world war, and he stated he was willing to support Mussolini's conference if it was "not a new Munich". As the cabinet meeting opened, Daladier quite consciously turned his back on Bonnet and refused to speak to him as a way of showing he was against the munichois faction in the cabinet, headed by Bonnet.

One who was present wrote that Daladier "bristled like a hedgehog. He turned his back on Bonnet from the first minute. His expression was one of contemptuous disgust". At that cabinet meeting, Bonnet stated that France should accept the Italian offer and reject the British precondition for acceptance, the demobilisation of the German Army. Daladier had been well briefed by St. Léger to rebut Bonnet. Daladier read out to the cabinet Coulondre's letter, which he had received two days earlier, and then said, "The trial of strength turns to our advantage. It is only necessary to hold, hold, hold!" St. Léger had kept Coulondre's letter a secret from Bonnet but passed it on to Daladier.

Bonnet was taken by surprise by Coulondre's letter and was left fuming in rage, as Coulondre's letter won over the cabinet. Daladier, strongly supported by Gamelin, argued that Mussolini's proposed peace conference was a trick to prevent France from declaring war on Germany, and France should not send a delegation to attend it. Despite the cabinet meeting, Bonnet ordered François-Poncet to tell Count Ciano that France would attend the conference. Likewise, Bonnet told Phipps that he would attend Mussolini's conference, and at 10:15 a.m. on the morning of 1 September 1939, Halifax received a dispatch stating that France was going to attend the conference to stop a war that had already broken out earlier that morning.

=== Final days of peace ===
When Bonnet first learned of the German attack on Poland at 8:20 a.m., on 1 September 1939, his first reaction was to contact the Italian Ambassador to France, Baron Raffaele Guariglia, and informed him that France had accepted Mussolini's mediation offer. Guariglia received a phone call from his French cousin, the Comte de Ronceray, who, in turn, had been briefed by de Monzie. The Comte de Ronceray dismissed the German invasion of Poland as an unfortunate contretemps but told Guariglia that Bonnet had lied that Bonnet had won over the cabinet into accepting Mussolini's conference. At 10 am, Guariglia met Bonnet at the Quai d'Orsay and was told by Bonnet that France had accepted the Italian plan for a conference. Present in Bonnet's office were his allies François Piétri; Henri Béranger, the chairman of the Senate Foreign Affairs Committee; Jean Mistler, the chairman of the Chamber of Deputies Foreign Affairs Committee; and Air Minister Guy la Chambre. Bonnet then ordered François-Poncet to see Mussolini about when the peace conference could begin. Bonnet argued very strongly in the cabinet against a French declaration of war and instead urged that the French take up Mussolini's mediation offer. If the Poles refused to attend Mussolini's conference, which was widely expected since Mussolini's revised peace plan on 1 September called for an armistice, not for the removal of German troops from Poland, the major Polish precondition to accepting the Italian plan, the French should denounce the Polish alliance.

The French cabinet met later that morning to vote to order French mobilization at once and called upon a special session of the National Assembly to vote for a request for 75 billion francs in war credits. Bonnet continued to argue for attending Mussolini's conference. Later that day, Bonnet ordered the Ambassador in London, Charles Corbin, to tell the British that Mussolini's peace offers had been accepted by France. Corbin, in turn, reported that now that war had begun, the British were starting to lose interest in the Italian mediation offer. Likewise, the Ambassador in Warsaw Léon Noël was instructed to see if the Poles would agree to attending Mussolini's proposed conference, only to receive an angry reply from Beck about when France proposed to honour the Franco-Polish alliance by declaring war on Germany. Strong British pressure for a warning to be delivered in Berlin made Bonnet reluctantly order Ambassador Robert Coulondre late on the afternoon of 1 September to warn Ribbentrop that if Germany continued with its aggression, France would declare war on Germany. At midnight on 1 September, Bonnet had Havas issue a statement: "The French government has today, as have several other Governments, received an Italian proposal looking to the resolution of Europe's difficulties. After due consideration the French government has given a 'positive response'".

On the morning of 2 September, an angry scene occurred at the Quai d'Orsay when Polish Ambassador Juliusz Łukasiewicz marched in unannounced and during a stormy interview with Bonnet demanded to know why France had not yet declared war. Later that day, Bonnet, during a phone conversation with Count Ciano, made a great point of insisting that the French démarche of 1 September was not an ultimatum, as he urged that the Italians start the peace conference as soon as possible. Bonnet was serious about the conference, but the proposed conference was aborted when Halifax stated that unless the Germans withdrew from Poland immediately, Britain would not attend.

During a phone call to Halifax later on 2 September, Bonnet could not persuade Halifax to drop the precondition about a German withdrawal. At about 5:00 p.m., Bonnet had another tempestuous interview with Łukasiewicz, who pressed him very strongly for a French declaration of war and accused Bonnet of plotting to betray Poland by keeping France neutral. As part of an effort to gain British acceptance of the Italian plan, Bonnet sought to see if it was possible for the Germans to stage a "symbolic withdrawal" from Poland, only to learn from Lord Halifax that a "symbolic withdrawal" was unacceptable and from Ribbentrop that no withdrawal, symbolic or otherwise, was being considered in Berlin.

Corbin sought to sabotage Bonnet's policy by advising Chamberlain that he should speak only to Daladier. Bonnet, together with his allies in the "peace lobby" both in and out of the government like Anatole de Monzie, Jean Mistler, Marcel Déat, Paul Faure, Paul Baudoin, Pierre Laval, René Belin, Adrien Marquet, and Gaston Bergery, spent 1 to 3 September lobbying the Daladier government, the Senate and the Chamber of Deputies against going to war with Germany. Bonnet told Daladier the lie that that Count Ciano had persuaded the Germans to accept an armistice as part of the peace plan, but in fact, Ciano had told Bonnet the precise opposite.

There was a moment that Bonnet believed that he could use the Italian conference as an excuse for renouncing the alliance with Poland and keeping France out of the war. However, Daladier continued to insist that the Reich had to cease its war against Poland and pull out all of its forces from Poland, and he lost interest when he learned the peace plan did not include those demands. The cabinet decided for war on 2 September but agreed for an extra 24 hours, as Gamelin insisted that France needed more time to mobilise millions of men to the colours without fear of Luftwaffe attacks. At 10:30 pm. on 2 September 1939, Lord Halifax, in a phone call to Bonnet, told him that Britain would declare war on Germany the next day and abandoned interest in a planned simultaneous presentations of declarations of war.

On 3 September 1939, Britain declared war on Germany, which had the effect of resolving the debate in Paris, and Daladier finally had the French declaration of war issued later that same day. For a week after the war was declared, Daladier avoided having the cabinet meet to ensure that Bonnet would not have a chance to put forward his views about seeking peace with Germany. Bonnet was demoted to minister of justice on 13 September.

== Later career ==
In the latter half of March 1940, Bonnet together with his "peace lobby" allies such as Anatole de Monzie, Pierre-Étienne Flandin, Pierre Laval, Jean Montigny, Jean-Louis Tixier-Vignancour, Georges Scapini, René Dommanage, Gaston Bergery, René Chateau, and René Brunet, made a major lobbying effort to have Laval appointed foreign minister as a prelude to making peace with Germany. Besides chairing meetings of the "peace lobby", which met six times during the Phoney War, Bonnet otherwise remained silent as Justice Minister. On 21 June 1940, Bonnet, together with Laval, helped to pressure President Albert Lebrun to change his mind about leaving for Algeria.

On 10 July 1940, Bonnet voted in favour of granting the cabinet presided by Marshal Philippe Pétain authority to draw up a new constitution, thereby effectively ending the French Third Republic and establishing Vichy France. He supported the Vichy government and served on its National Council from December 1940. As the council never met, his role in Vichy was small. Bonnet spent most of World War II living on his estate in the Dordogne and attempting to secure himself an office in Vichy, but Bonnet was later to claim to have been involved in the French Resistance. According to Gestapo records, Bonnet contacted the Germans once in February 1941 to see if the Germans would pressure Laval to include him in the Cabinet and again in June 1943 to reassure them that he had no intention of leaving France to join the Allies. In November 1942, Bonnet agreed to testify for the prosecution at the planned trial of Herschel Grynszpan. Bonnet was to testify that his efforts at reaching a rapprochement with the Reich had been sabotaged by the Jews, who were intent on starting a war with Germany, and that Grynszpan had assassinated Ernst vom Rath as part of an alleged Jewish conspiracy to push France into war with Germany. However, the trial was never held, as Gryszpan's planned defence that he was having a homosexual relationship with Rath and had shot him as part of a lover's quarrel meant that from the German viewpoint, the trial was too risky, as people might have believed that claim.

On 5 April 1944, Bonnet fled France for Switzerland and claimed that his life was in danger. Bonnet stayed in exile until March 1950. After the war, proceedings were begun against him but were eventually dropped although he was expelled from the Radical Party in 1944. During his time in exile, Bonnet was to write a five-volume set of memoirs. Bonnet, throughout his career, had been very much concerned with his reputation, and during his time as Foreign Minister, he had a team of journalists to engage in what is known in France as Bonnetiste writing, a series of books and pamphlets meant to glorify him as the defender of the peace and Europe's savior. After leaving the Quai d'Orsay, Bonnet took with him a large number of official papers, which he then used to support the claims made in his voluminous memoirs in which Bonnet depicted himself as waging a single-handed heroic battle to save the peace. Many have charged Bonnet with "editing" his papers to present himself in the best possible light, regardless of the facts. In particular, criticism has centered on some of the contradictory claims in the Bonnet memoirs. At various points, Bonnet claimed that British pressure had driven France towards Munich in 1938 and that his government wanted to fight for Czechoslovakia. At other times, Bonnet states the military and economic situation in 1938 was such that France could not risk a war in 1939.

In the early 1950s, Bonnet had an intense debate on the pages of the Times Literary Supplement with one of his leading critics, the British historian Sir Lewis Namier over some of the claims contained in his memoirs. At issue was whether Bonnet had, as Namier charged, snubbed an offer by Polish Foreign Minister Colonel Józef Beck in May 1938 to have Poland come to the aid of Czechoslovakia in the event of a German attack. Bonnet denied that such an offer had been made, which led Namier to accuse Bonnet of seeking to falsify the documentary record. Namier established that Bonnet had been less than honest in his account, and he concluded the debate in 1953 with these words: "The Polish offer, for what it was worth, was first torpedoed by Bonnet the statesman, and next obliterated by Bonnet the historian". The real significance of the debate was over Bonnet's freedom of manoeuvre. In his memoirs, Bonnet claimed that he had been often forced by circumstances beyond his control to carry out a foreign policy that he opposed. Namier charged that Bonnet had other options and was carrying out the same foreign policy that he had wanted to carry out.

Readmitted to the Radicals in 1952, in 1953 Bonnet was allowed to run for office again. He was once again expelled in 1955 for refusing to support Pierre Mendès France. Nevertheless, he was once again elected to the Chamber of Deputies in 1956 for his old seat in the Dordogne and continued to serve in that body until he lost his seat in 1968.

== Sources ==
- Adamthwaite, Anthony (1977). France and the Coming of the Second World War 1936–1939. London: Frank Cass. ISBN 0-7146-3035-7..
- Balińska, Marta A (1998). For the Good of Humanity Ludwik Rajchman, Medical Statesman. Budapest: Central European University Press. ISBN 9789633865675.
- Cameron, Elizabeth (1953). "Alexis Saint-Léger-Léger". In Gordon A. Craig & Felix Gilbert (ed.). The Diplomats 1919-1939. Princeton: Princeton University Press. pp. 378–405.
- Cienciala, Anna (1999). "The Munich crisis of 1938: Plans and Strategy in Warsaw in the context of Wester appeasement of Germany". In Igor Lukes and Erik Goldstein (ed.). The Munich Crisis, 1938: Prelude to World War II. London: Frank Cass. pp. 48–81.
- Duroselle, Jean-Baptiste (2004). France and the Nazi Threat: The Collapse of French Diplomacy, 1932–1939. New York: Enigma Books. ISBN 1-929631-15-4..
- Frankstein, Robert (1983). "The Decline of France and French Appeasement Policies, 1936-9". In Wolfgang Mommsen & Lothar Kettenacker (ed.). The Fascist Challenge and the Policy of Appeasement. London: George Allen & Unwin. pp. 236–245. ISBN 0-04-940068-1..
- Haight Jr, John McVickar. "France, the United States, and the Munich crisis." Journal of Modern History 32.4 (1960): 340–358. online
- Hucker, Daniel (Summer 2011). "Public Opinion between Munich and Prague: The View from the French Embassy". Contemporary British History. 25 (3): 407–427. doi:10.1080/13619462.2011.597551. S2CID 145435987..
- Hucker, Daniel (2016). Public Opinion and the End of Appeasement in Britain and France. London: Taylor & Francis. ISBN 9781317073543.
- Irvine, William (1998). "Domestic Politics and the Fall of France in 1940". In Joel Blatt (ed.). The French Defeat of 1940. Providence: Berghahn Books. pp. 85–99.
- Imlay, Talbot (1998). "France and the Phony War, 1939–1940". In Robert Boyce (ed.). French Foreign and Defence Policy, 1918–1940 The Decline and Fall of A Great Power. London, United Kingdom: Routledge. pp. 261–280. ISBN 0-415-15039-6.
- Jackson, Peter (1998). "Intelligence and the End of Appeasement". In Robert Boyce (ed.). French Foreign and Defence Policy, 1918–1940 The Decline and Fall of A Great Power. London, United Kingdom: Routledge. pp. 234–260. ISBN 0-415-15039-6..
- Kaiser, David (2015). Economic Diplomacy and the Origins of the Second World War Germany, Britain, France, and Eastern Europe, 1930-1939. Princeton: Princeton University Press. ISBN 9781400875719.
- Kersaudy, François (1981). Churchill and de Gaulle. Saddle Brook: Stratford Press.
- Keylor, William (1998). "France and the Illusion of American Support 1919-1940". In Joel Blatt (ed.). The French Defeat of 1940 Reassessments. Providence, Rhode Island: Berghahn Books. pp. 204–244.
- Kreissler, Françoise (2014). "China-Europe: Transcontinental "intellectual co-operation" during the interwar period". In Isabelle Rabut & Hsiao-yen Peng (ed.). Modern China and the West Translation and Cultural Mediation. Leiden: Brill. pp. 15–27. ISBN 9789004270220.
- Lacaze, Yvon (1998). "Daladier, Bonnet and the Decision-Making Process During the Munich Crisis, 1938". In Robert Boyce (ed.). French Foreign and Defence Policy, 1918–1940 The Decline and Fall of A Great Power. London, United Kingdom: Routledge. pp. 215–233. ISBN 0-415-15039-6..
- May, Ernest (2000). Strange Victory: Hitler's Conquest of France. New York: Hill & Wang. ISBN 0809088541.
- Marrus, Michael; Paxton, Robert O. (1995). Vichy France and the Jews. Stanford: Stanford University Press. ISBN 9780804724999.
- Morrison, Rodney (July 1993). "The London Monetary and Economic Conference of 1933: A Public Goods Analysis". American Journal of Economics and Sociology. 52 (3): 307–321. doi:10.1111/j.1536-7150.1993.tb02552.x.
- Overy, Richard; Wheatcroft, Andrew (1989). The Road to War. London: Macmillan.
- Overy, Richard (2009). 1939 Countdown to War. London: Penguin.
- Réau, Elisabeth du (1998). "Édouard Daladier: The Conduct of the War and the Beginnings of Defeat". In Joel Blatt (ed.). The French Defeat of 1940 Reassessments. Providence: Berghahn Book. pp. 100–125.
- Riess, Curt Total Espionage: Germany's Information and Disinformation Apparatus 1932–1941, UK: Fonthill, 2016, ISBN 978-1-78155-451-7
- Steinweis, Alan (October 2008). "The Trials of Herschel Grynszpan: Anti-Jewish Policy and German Propaganda, 1938-1942". German Studies Review. 31 (3): 471–488.
- Smith, Leonard V. (2014). The Embattled Self: French Soldiers' Testimony of the Great War. Ithaca, New York: Cornell University Press. ISBN 9780801471216.
- Stafford, P. R. (February 1984). "The French Government and the Danzig Crisis: The Italian Dimension". The International History Review. 6 (1): 48–87. doi:10.1080/07075332.1984.9640333.
- Thomas, Martin (1999). "France and the Czechoslovak Crisis, 1938". In Igor Lukes and Erik Goldstein (ed.). The Munich 1938, Prelude to World War II. London: Frank Cass. pp. 122–159.
- Thomas, Martin (2009). "Disaster Foreseen? France and the Fall of Singapore". In Brian Farrell & Sandy Hunter (ed.). A Great Betrayal? The Fall of Singapore Revisited. London: Marshall Cavendish. pp. 53–73. ISBN 9789814435468.
- Tung, William (1977). V. K. Wellington Koo and China's Wartime Diplomacy. Queens: Center of Asian Studies, St. John's University.
- Young, Robert (1978). In Command of France French Foreign Policy and Military Planning, 1933–1940. Cambridge, Massachusetts, United States of America: Harvard University Press.
- Young, Robert (1996). France and the Origins of the Second World War. London: Macmillan. ISBN 0312161867.
- Watt, Donald Cameron (1989). How War Came: The Immediate Origins of the Second World War, 1938–1939. London: Heinemann. ISBN 0-394-57916-X..
- Weinberg, Gerhard (1980). The Foreign Policy of Hitler's Germany Volume 2 Starting World War Two 1937-1939. Chicago: University of Chicago Press.

Political offices
Preceded by —	Minister of Budget; 1925	Succeeded by —
Preceded by Paul Jourdain	Minister of Pensions; 1926	Succeeded by Louis Marin
Preceded by Pierre Étienne Flandin	Minister of Commerce and Industry; 1930	Succeeded by Pierre Étienne Flandin
Preceded by André Mallarmé	Minister of Posts, Telegraphs, and Telephones; 1930–1931	Succeeded by Charles Guernier
Preceded by Édouard Daladier	Minister of Public Works; 1932–1933	Succeeded by Joseph Paganon
Preceded by Henry Chéron	Minister of Finance; 1933–1934	Succeeded by François Piétri
Preceded by Laurent Eynac	Minister of Commerce and Industry; 1935–1936	Succeeded by Paul Bastid
Preceded by Vincent Auriol	Minister of Finance; 1937–1938	Succeeded by Paul Marchandeau
Preceded by Paul Faure, Maurice Viollette, Albert Sarraut	Minister of State; 1938	Succeeded by Paul Faure, Théodore Steeg, Maurice Viollette
Preceded by Joseph Paul-Boncour	Minister of Foreign Affairs; 1938–1939	Succeeded by Édouard Daladier
Preceded by Paul Marchandeau	Minister of Justice; 1939–1940	Succeeded by Albert Sérol
