= Guy Mollet =

French politician (1905–1975)

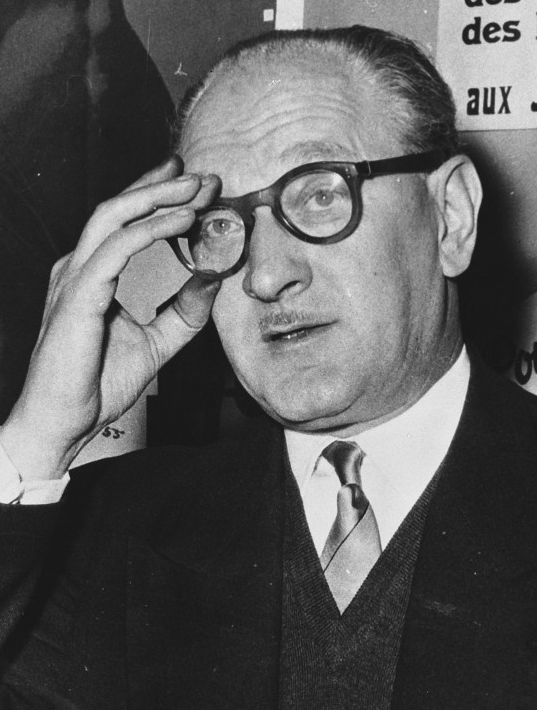
- Mollet in 1958

Prime Minister of France
- In office 1 February 1956 – 13 June 1957
- President: René Coty
- Preceded by: Edgar Faure
- Succeeded by: Maurice Bourgès-Maunoury

Member of the National Assembly for Nord's 1st constituency
- In office 28 November 1946 – 3 October 1975
- Succeeded by: André Delehedde

Mayor of Arras
- In office 15 May 1945 – 3 October 1975
- Preceded by: René Méric
- Succeeded by: Léon Fatous

Personal details
- Born: 31 December 1905 Flers, France
- Died: 3 October 1975 (aged 69) 7th arrondissement of Paris, France
- Party: SFIO (1923–1969); PS (1969–1975)

Guy Alcide Mollet (French: [ɡi mɔlɛ]; 31 December 1905 – 3 October 1975) was a French politician. He led the socialist French Section of the Workers' International (SFIO) from 1946 to 1969 and was the French Prime Minister from 1956 to 1957.

As Prime Minister, Mollet passed some significant domestic reforms and worked for European integration, proposing the Franco-British Union. He became unpopular in both the left and the right in the country for his international policy, especially during the Suez Crisis and the Algerian War.

== Early life ==
He was born in Flers in Normandy, the son of a textile worker. He was educated in Le Havre and became an English teacher in Arras Grammar School. Like most other teachers, he was an active member of the socialist SFIO, joining in 1923, and in 1928 he became SFIO Secretary for the Pas-de-Calais département.

== World War II ==
He joined the Armée de terre (the French Army) in 1939 and was taken prisoner by the Germans. Released after seven months, he joined the French Resistance, where he was a captain, in the Arras area and was three times arrested and interrogated by the Gestapo.

== Early political career ==
In October 1945, Mollet was elected to the French National Assembly as a representative from Pas-de-Calais. In 1946, he became secretary-general of the SFIO, standing against Daniel Mayer, the candidate supported by Léon Blum. He was also Mayor of Arras at this time. Mollet represented the left wing of the party, which feared the dissolution of the Socialist identity in a centrist alliance.

Although he retained Marxist terminology, he accepted the alliance with the centre and centre-right parties during the Fourth Republic, and his relations with the French Communist Party (PCF), which had become the largest left-wing party, were very poor: "the Communist Party is not on the left, but in the East".

== Cabinet roles ==
He served as deputy prime minister in 1946, in Blum's government.

From 1950 to 1951, he was Minister for European Relations in the government of the Radical René Pleven, and in 1951, he was deputy prime minister in the government of Henri Queuille.

== Europe ==
Mollet supported a Western European Federation. He represented France at the Council of Europe, and he was President of the Socialist Group on the council's Assembly.

== Socialist international ==
From 1951 to 1969, he was vice-president of the Socialist International.

== Premiership ==
During the 1956 legislative campaign, Mollet created a centre-left coalition, the Republican Front, containing the Radical Party of Pierre Mendès-France, the Democratic and Socialist Union of the Resistance of François Mitterrand and the Social Gaullists of Jacques Chaban-Delmas.

The coalition won the election with a promise to re-establish the peace in Algeria. As leader of the main party of the coalition, Mollet led and formed a cabinet in January 1956.

=== Foreign policy ===
In foreign policy, Mollet negotiated and signed the Treaty of Rome, creating the European Economic Community. Liberalising reforms were carried out in various parts of the French Empire but not in Algeria. Gaston Defferre's loi-cadre of 23 June 1956 generalised universal suffrage throughout the territories d'outre-mer and based their assemblies on a single voting roll.

The government established the BEPTOM (Bureau d'études des postes et télécommunications d'outre-mer) to support communications in the newly independent former colonies.

==== Suez Crisis ====
Despite those successes, Mollet, who wanted to concentrate on domestic issues, found himself confronted with several major foreign policy crises. Egypt's president, Gamal Abdel Nasser, continued to support the Algerian rebels and also nationalised the Suez Canal, which led to the Suez Crisis.

The Anglophile Mollet and British Prime Minister Sir Anthony Eden shared a mutual concern for maintaining their overseas possessions. Eden also feared that Nasser intended to cut off oil supplies to Europe. In October 1956 Mollet, Eden and the prime minister of Israel, David Ben-Gurion, met and colluded, in the Protocol of Sèvres, in a joint attack of Egypt.

The Israelis invaded Egypt first, with British and French troops invading the northern Suez Canal area shortly afterward, under the pretext of restoring order in the area. However, the scheme met with unexpected opposition from the United States, both at the United Nations General Assembly and with economic measures. France and Britain were forced into a humiliating backdown.

Eden resigned as a result, but Mollet survived the crisis despite fierce leftist criticism.

In Michael Karpin's 2001 documentary A Bomb in the Basement, Abel Thomas, the chief of political staff for France's defense minister in 1956, said that Francis Perrin, the head of the French Atomic Energy Commission, told Mollet that Israel should be provided with a nuclear bomb. According to the documentary, France provided Israel with a nuclear reactor and staff to set it up in Israel, together with enriched uranium and the means to produce plutonium, in exchange for support in the Suez War.

==== Algeria ====
In the post-war period, Mollet was aware of, and approved of, the fraudulent elections held in French Algeria while the Socialist Naegelen was governor-general of Algeria from 1948 to 1951. Like the rest of the French Left, Mollet opposed French colonialism and had supported Mendès-France's efforts in office to withdraw from Tunisia and Morocco, which were granted independence in 1956 by the loi-cadre Deferre. Mollet's government was left with the issue of the three French departments of Algeria, where the presence of a million non-Muslim French residents made a simple withdrawal politically difficult.

At first, Mollet's policy was to negotiate with the National Liberation Front (FLN); he used the campaign slogan "peace in Algeria." He emphasized the need for unity between Algeria and France, but pledged to ensure equality of Algerians and French metropole residents. Once in office, however, he changed his mind and argued that the FLN insurgents must be defeated before negotiations could begin. He removed Jacques Soustelle as Governor-General of Algeria and replaced him with Georges Catroux.

Mollet's visit to Algiers, the capital of French Algeria, was a stormy one, with almost everyone against him. One French settler, André Achiary, planned a violent attack against Mollet, along with a group of "ultras" (right-wing settlers). They planned to hire North African assassins so the violence would be blamed on the FLN. Frantz Fanon, who was providing Achiary's wife with psychiatric treatment, reported the plot to André Mandouze, who informed the French minister of state, Pierre Mendés-France. The assassination attempt never took place.

He was pelted with rotten tomatoes at a demonstration in Algiers on 6 February 1956, a few weeks after he became prime minister. About 60,000 European demonstrators were present, and chanted slogans including "Mollet to the gallows!" The event was referred to as la journée des tomates ("the day of tomatoes"). Upon returning to Paris, Mollet announced that he would increase French troops in Algeria from about 50,000 to about 500,000, and would replace Catroux with the heavily anti-FLN Robert Lacoste. He introduced a bill requesting "special powers" against the FLN, which passed with a significant majority: 455-76.

The French soldiers conducted a campaign of counterterrorism, including torture, particularly during the Battle of Algiers (January to October 1957). It was too much for most French people, and Mollet's government collapsed in June 1957 on the issue of the taxation to pay for the Algerian War. The Secretary of State to Foreign Affairs, Alain Savary, also a SFIO member, resigned because of his opposition to Mollet's hardline stance in Algeria.

=== Domestic policy ===
Mollet's cabinet carried out a programme of progressive social reform, which was almost unnoticed because of both the international context and the Algerian War. Substantial improvements were made in welfare provision for the sick and elderly, funding for regional aid and housing was increased veterans' payments were extended and a third week of paid holidays was introduced. Mollet's government passed other pieces of social legislation during its time in office, including an increase in wages and improved medical benefits.

The level and mechanism of state pensions to both the elderly and chronically-ill was improved, and working-class housing was also given close attention. HLMs were a top priority in the government's target of 320,000 houses in 1956. Educational opportunities were increased, and wage-price levels were adjusted in favour of workers and civil servants. A decree of September 1956 increased the means ceiling "for the purposes of eligibility to most social assistance benefits," while Acts dated the 3rd August 1956 and the 3rd of December 1956 (as noted by one study) "extended to 1 January 1959 the period during which a judge sitting in chambers may suspend the enforcement of court eviction orders for successive periods in excess of one year if the persons evicted are unable to find satisfactory alternative accommodation." The latter Act also permanently prohibited eviction during the winter unless those affected were provided with alternative accommodation that was suitable to the family's needs and maintaining its unity.

In June 1956, a national solidarity fund for the elderly was set up, which provided supplementary allowances for elderly people to provide them with a more adequate income. In addition, a law of December 1956 established an allowance for the mothers of household for non-salaried workers. Sales tax on essential commodities was abolished while regional differences in minimum wage standards across France were reduced.

A decree of November 1956 abolished written homework for children until the sixth grade, thereby lightening the load on French schoolchildren; official instructions of January 1957 also specified that nursery schools should include such facilities as a medical room and a recreational room. An act was passed in April 1957 to allow people who employed domestic help in their service to form an employers' association, and a law was passed for the legal status of the Agence France-Presse news agency. In addition, an act in July 1957 confirmed a 1955 decree that created a complementary procedure for mediation.

To encourage scientific research, a decree in March 1957 made provision for research bonuses to be awarded to research workers of the National Centre for Scientific Research and to staff of universities and technical colleges engaged in research. Under a decree in June 1956, the Atomic Energy Authority founded the National Institute of Technical Nuclear Science at Saclay. Under an act in March 1957, a National Institute of Applied Science was opened in Lyon. Under a decree in November 1956, the National Institute of Nuclear Science and Techniques was authorised "to organise courses for third-cycle doctorates in metallurgy and in accelerator physics awarded by science faculties, as well as to award the necessary certificates for the obtention of these doctorates." A ministerial decision of November 1956, instituted a course in atomic engineering at the National Institute of Nuclear Science and Techniques" that was "designed to train engineers in the construction and working of nuclear reactors."

A decree in August 1956 started a national diploma in fine arts, and a ministerial decision in December 1956 started a national certificate of oenology. A decree in February 1957 founded in each faculty of arts or science, under the dean's authority, "a training institute for secondary school teachers, run by a professor" to train future teachers for secondary, teacher training, national vocational and technical schools.

Although the Mollet government introduced a broad range of reforms during its time in office, financial constraints prevented the passage of other planned reforms, such as the refunding of a higher percentage of prescription charges, extended rights for comités d'enterprise and the compulsory arbitration of works disputes.

=== End of government ===
Mollet's cabinet was the last government formed by the SFIO, which was in increasing decline, and it was also the last stable government of the Fourth Republic.

=== Supporter of de Gaulle ===
The Algiers coup in May 1958, led by veterans of the First Indochina War and the Suez Crisis, brought Charles de Gaulle to power from retirement and in effect seized power. Mollet supported de Gaulle on the grounds that France needed a new constitution to allow the formation of strong governments.

De Gaulle appointed him one of four Secretaries of State in his first cabinet. That caused the creation of the PSU, the Unified Socialist Party, formed by the PSA Autonomous Socialist Party and the UGS (Union de la gauche socialiste, a split of the SFIO).

== Later life ==
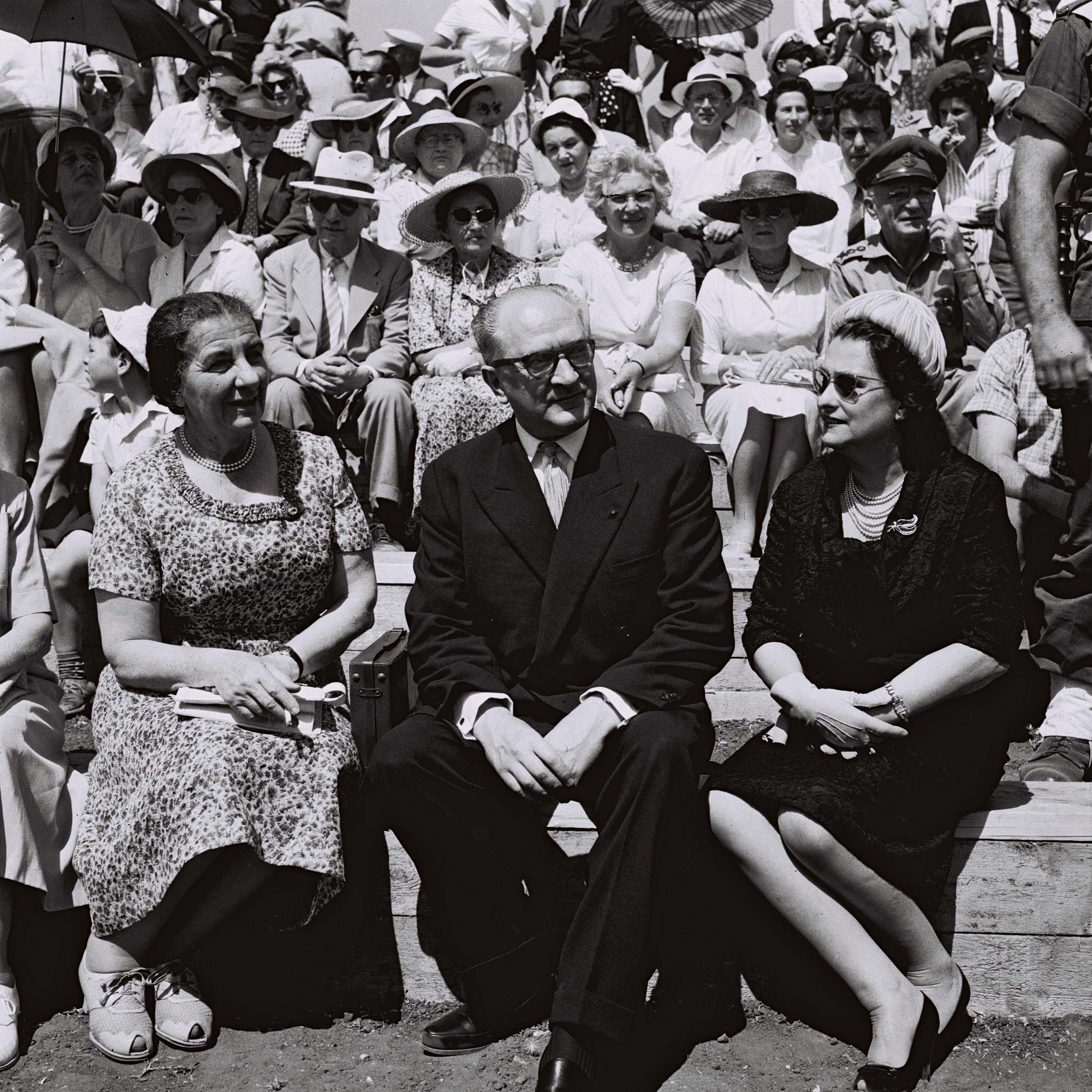
Guy Mollet, with his wife and Golda Meir, watch Israel's Independence Day Parade in Tel Aviv, 13 May 1959

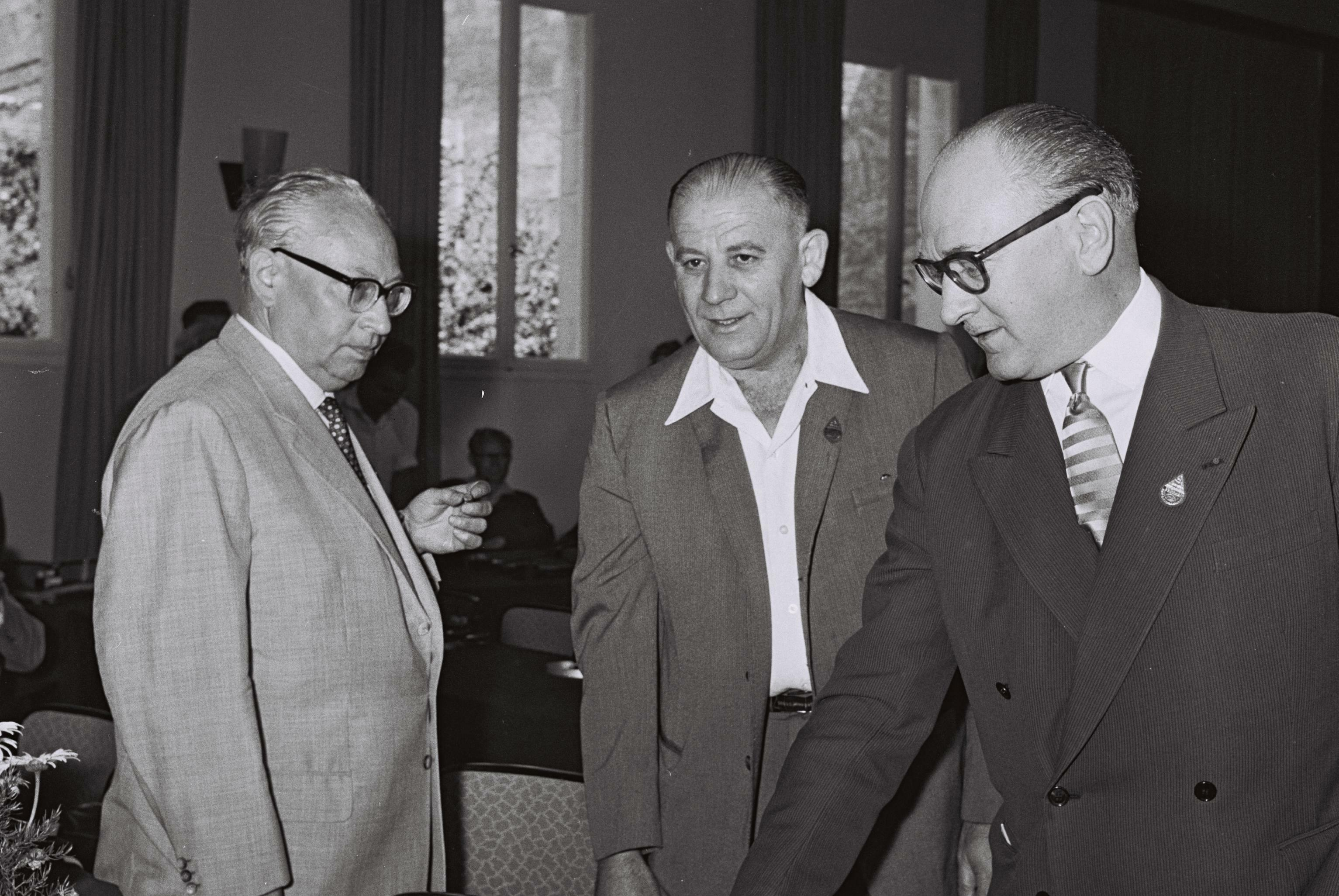
Guy Mollet at a Socialist International meeting in Haifa in 1960, with Erich Ollenhauer (left)

Mollet resigned from de Gaulle's cabinet in 1959 and did not hold office again. He remained Secretary-General of the SFIO, but Gaulle's new Fifth Republic made it a powerless opposition party. By the 1960s, it was in terminal decline.

During the 1965 presidential campaign, he presented himself again as the guardian of Socialist identity, opposing the candidacy of Gaston Defferre, who proposed the constitution of a "Great Federation" with the non-Gaullist centre-right. Mollet supported François Mitterrand's candidacy and participated in the centre-left coalition Federation of the Democratic and Socialist Left, which would split three years later.

His leadership over the party was being more and more challenged. He could not prevent Defferre being the SFIO candidate at the 1969 presidential election.

The disastrous result (5%) induced the SFIO to merge with left-wing clubs to form the new French Socialist Party. Mollet abandoned the leadership to Alain Savary. However, the internal opposition to Savary accused Mollet of being the true party leader from the sidelines and allied with François Mitterrand, who joined the party during the Épinay Congress and took the leadership in 1971.

Mollet and his followers were ejected in the minority of the party. He mocked the Socialist speeches of Mitterrand: "He is not socialist, he has learned to speak socialist".

Mollet died in Paris in 1975 of a heart attack.

== Legacy ==
He is one of the most controversial of the French Socialist leaders. His name is tied up with the SFIO decline and his repressive policy in Algeria. In French political language, the word molletisme equates to duplicity, making left-wing speeches to win elections and then implementing a conservative policy. French Socialist politicians currently prefer the moral authority of Pierre Mendès-France, even though he was not a member of the party.

His biography, by Denis Lefebvre, was called Guy Mollet: Le mal aimé ("Guy Mollet: The Unloved One").

== Cabinet ==
Mollet Government
- 20th Cabinet of the Fourth Republic Cabinet of France

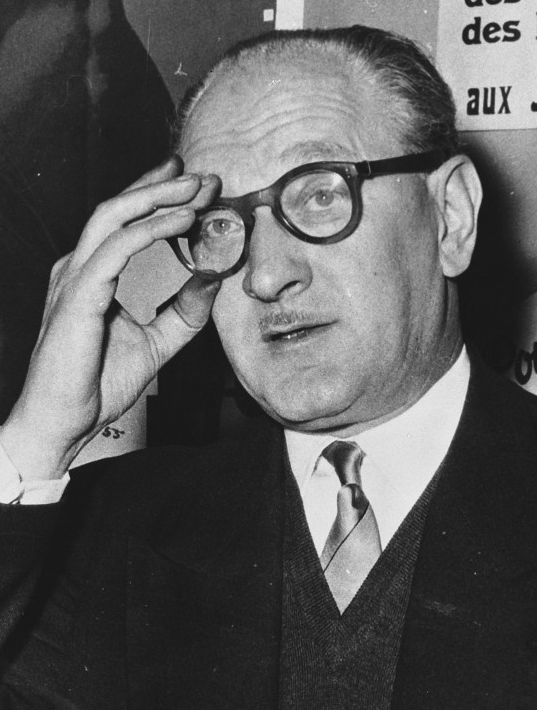
- Date formed: 1 February 1956
- Date dissolved: 13 June 1957

People and organisations
- President of the Republic: Rene Coty
- Head of government: Guy Mollet
- Member party: SFIO
- Status in legislature: Republican Front (France) SFIO Radical Party (France) UDSR 192 / 595(32%)

History
- Election: 1956 French legislative election
- Legislature term: Third Legislature of the Fourth Republic
- Predecessor: Second Faure Government
- Successor: Bourges-Maunoury Government

The cabinet lasted from 1 February 1956 to 13 June 1957 and contained the following members:

Portfolio	Holder	Party
President of the Council of Ministers	Guy Mollet	SFIO
Minister of Foreign Affairs	Christian Pineau	SFIO
Minister of the Interior	Jean Gilbert-Jules	PRS
Minister of Justice	François Mitterrand	UDSR
Minister of the Armed Forces	Maurice Bourgès-Maunoury	PRS
Minister of Finance	Robert Lacoste	SFIO
Minister of National Education	René Billères	PRS
Minister of Social Affairs	Albert Gazier	SFIO
Minister of Veterans Affairs	François Tanguy-Prigent	SFIO
Minister of Overseas France	Gaston Defferre	SFIO
Minister of Algerian Affairs	Georges Catroux	Military
Minister of State	Pierre Mendès France	PRS
Minister of State	Félix Houphouët-Boigny	RDA

:

- 14 February 1956 – Paul Ramadier succeeds Lacoste as Minister of Finance and Economic Affairs. Morice leaves the cabinet and is not replaced as Minister of Industry.
- 21 February 1956 – Jacques Chaban-Delmas enters the cabinet as Minister of State.
- 23 May 1956 – Mendès-France leaves the cabinet.

== Sources ==
- Aussaresses, General Paul, The Battle of the Casbah: Terrorism and Counter-Terrorism in Algeria, 1955–1957. (New York: Enigma Books, 2010) ISBN 978-1-929631-30-8.

Party political offices
Preceded by Daniel Mayer	General Secretary of the French Section of the Workers' International; 1946–1969	Succeeded by Alain Savary
Political offices
Preceded by —	Minister of State; 1946–1947	Succeeded by —
Preceded by —	Minister for the Council of Europe; 1950–1951	Succeeded by —
Preceded by —	Deputy Prime Minister of France with René Pleven and Georges Bidault; 1951	Succeeded by René Mayer
Preceded by Edgar Faure	Prime Minister of France; 1956–1957	Succeeded by Maurice Bourgès-Maunoury
Preceded by François de Menthon	President of the Parliamentary Assembly of the Council of Europe; 1956–1959	Succeeded by Fernand Dehousse
Preceded by —	Deputy Prime Minister of France; 1958	Succeeded by —
Preceded by —	Minister of State; 1958	Succeeded by —
Preceded by —	Minister of General Civil Servant Status; 1958–1959	Succeeded by —
