= Fréville =

Fréville is the name or part of the name of the following communes in France:

- George Freville, 16th-century English politician
- Henri Fréville (1905–1987), French historian
- Jean Fréville (1895–1971), French writer, journalist, literary, art critic, translator and historian
- William Freville (c. 1396–1460), English politician
- Fréville, Seine-Maritime, in the Seine-Maritime department
- Fréville, Vosges, in the Vosges department
- Fréville-du-Gâtinais, in the Loiret department
