= René Pleven =

French politician (1901–1993)

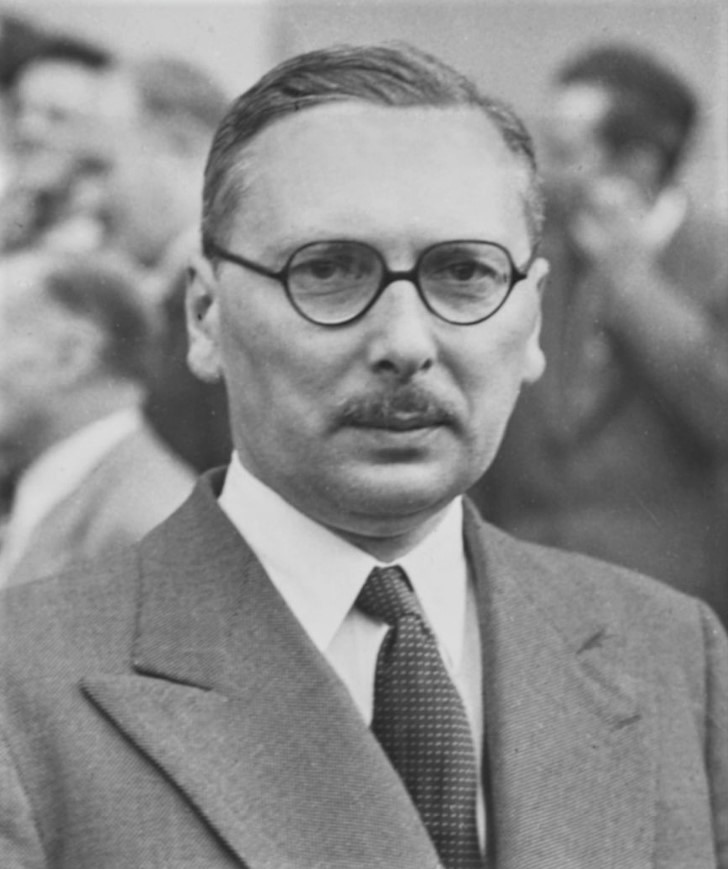
- Pleven in 1950

Prime Minister of France
- In office 11 August 1951 – 20 January 1952
- President: Vincent Auriol
- Preceded by: Henri Queuille
- Succeeded by: Edgar Faure
- In office 12 July 1950 – 10 March 1951
- President: Vincent Auriol
- Preceded by: Henri Queuille
- Succeeded by: Henri Queuille
Cabinet positions
Minister of Justice
In office 22 June 1969 – 15 March 1973
Prime Minister	Jacques Chaban-Delmas; Pierre Messmer
Preceded by	Jean-Marcel Jeanneney (interim); René Capitant
Succeeded by	Pierre Messmer (interim); Jean Taittinger
Minister of Foreign Affairs
In office 14 May 1958 – 28 May 1958
Prime Minister	Pierre Pflimlin
Preceded by	Christian Pineau
Succeeded by	Maurice Couve de Murville
Minister of Defence
In office 8 March 1952 – 12 June 1954
Prime Minister	Antoine Pinay; René Mayer; Joseph Laniel
Preceded by	Jules Moch
Succeeded by	Emmanuel Temple
In office 29 October 1949 – 12 July 1950
Prime Minister	Georges Bidault; Henri Queuille
Preceded by	René Mayer
Succeeded by	Jules Moch
Deputy Prime Minister of France
In office 10 March 1951 – 11 August 1951
Prime Minister	Henri Queuille
Preceded by	Georges Bidault
Succeeded by	Henri Queuille
Minister of Finances
In office 21 November 1945 – 26 January 1946
Prime Minister	Charles de Gaulle
Preceded by	Pierre Mendès France
Succeeded by	Robert Lacoste
Minister of National Education and Fine Arts
In office 6 April 1945 – 21 November 1946
Prime Minister	Charles de Gaulle
Preceded by	Jean Zay
Succeeded by	Paul Ramadier
Minister of Finances
In office 17 November 1944 – 6 April 1945
Prime Minister	Charles de Gaulle
Preceded by	Paul Ramadier
Succeeded by	Pierre Mendès France
Minister of Overseas France and the Colonies
In office 10 September 1944 – 17 November 1944
Prime Minister	Charles de Gaulle
Preceded by	Himself (as Commissioner)
Succeeded by	Paul Giacobbi
Commissioner for the Colonies
In office 25 August 1944 – 10 September 1944
Prime Minister	Charles de Gaulle
Preceded by	Hervé Alphand
Succeeded by	Himself (as Minister)
Parliamentarian positions
Member of the Chamber of Deputies
Constituency	Côtes-du-Nord (1945–58)
In office 6 November 1945 – 22 June 1969
Succeeded by	Ernest Rouxel

Personal details
- Born: René Jean Pleven; 15 April 1901 Rennes, Ille-et-Vilaine, France
- Died: 13 January 1993 (aged 91) Paris, France
- Party: UDSR (1945–58); MRP (1958–66); CD (1966–69); CDP (1969–73)
- Spouse: Anne Bompard (m. 1924; died 1966)
- Children: 3
- Education: University of Rennes; University of Paris; Sciences Po
- Occupation: Politician, statesman

René Jean Pleven (French: [ʁəne pləvɛ̃]; 15 April 1901 – 13 January 1993) was a notable political figure of the French Resistance and Fourth Republic. An early associate of Jean Monnet then member of the Free French led by Charles de Gaulle, he took a leading role in colonial and financial matters including the Gaullist takeover of French Equatorial Africa in 1940, the creation of the Caisse Centrale de la France Libre in 1941, the Brazzaville Conference in 1944, and the nationalization of the largest French banks in 1945.

In 1946, Pleven broke with De Gaulle and helped found the Democratic and Socialist Union of the Resistance (UDSR), a political party that was meant to be a successor to the wartime Resistance movement. He served as prime minister twice in the early 1950s and is remembered for the Pleven Plan for a European Defence Community, which he proposed in October 1950 in coordination with Monnet.

== Early life ==
René Pleven was born in Rennes on 15 April 1901 as the son of a commissioned officer and director of studies at the Special Military School of St. Cyr. After studying law at the University of Paris, he failed the exam for the financial corps of the civil service, so he decided to move to the United States, Canada, and Great Britain to work there. He rose to become a telephone company executive. In 1924, he married Anne Bompard.

== Wartime ==
Immediately after the breakout of the Second World War, he was in charge of encouraging the construction of aircraft for the Allies in the United States and of purchasing planes for France. As late as 1939, Pleven stated that "Politics do not interest me," but then a year later, he joined Charles de Gaulle's Free French Forces, which resisted the Nazi-allied French Vichy Regime. Pleven suggested a political union between Britain and France, with a unification of sovereignty and defensive forces. The plan, supported by Winston Churchill, Paul Reynaud and Charles de Gaulle was not approved due to the opposition of the French armistice with Germany. Pleven helped rally support for Free France in French Equatorial Africa. Returning to London, where de Gaulle and his forces were exiled, in 1941, he became national commissioner for the economy, finance, the colonies and foreign affairs of the French National Committee. In this role, he presided over a 1944 conference in Brazzaville, which opted for a more liberal policy towards the colonies.

== Postwar years ==
After France's liberation, he was the Minister of the Economy and Finance in the provisional government. After the war, Pleven was elected a legislator from the Côtes-du-Nord department. In 1946, he broke with Charles de Gaulle and founded the Democratic and Socialist Union of the Resistance (UDSR) serving as the party's president from 1946 to 1953. The party was positioned between the Radical Socialists and the Socialists, favoring limited industrial nationalization and state controls. He then held several Cabinet posts, most notably Defense Minister from 1949 to 1950. In July 1950 he became the country's Prime Minister, as power was shifting to the right. A passionate supporter of European integration, he pushed the ratification of the Schuman Plan for European integration creating the European Coal and Steel Community as Prime Minister. He had to face opposition from both left and right to push it through, but he collected enough votes in parliament by promising to increase farm loans and to lower taxes for low-income groups. After three days and two nights of debate, the treaty was ratified. He served until February 1951 and then again from August 1951 to January 1952, resigning over disagreements about budget deficits.

He then became Defense Minister again. His proposal for a European Defense Community, in which to integrate a re-armed Germany, known as the Pleven Plan, was defeated by the Gaullists, communists, and socialists. He also advocated a hard hand in defending French colonial rule in Indochina. In 1953, he resigned as chairman of the UDSR after his party supported the Vietnam peace talks. Being Minister of Defense from 1952 to 1954, he was responsible when the French lost the Battle of Dien Bien Phu initiating the crumbling of French hegemony in the whole region. In 1957, President René Coty offered him the opportunity to become Prime Minister again, but he turned it down. Instead, he became the Fourth Republic's last Foreign Minister in 1958.

In 1966, Pleven's wife died. He had had two daughters, Françoise and Nicole, with her. From 1969 to 1973, he served as Minister of Justice in the governments of Jacques Chaban-Delmas and Pierre Messmer, signing the pardon of notorious escapee Henri Charrière in 1970. Losing re-election as legislator in 1973, he became president of a regional development council in his native Brittany. He died of heart failure on 13 January 1993 at the age of 91.

== Governments ==
=== First ministry (12 July 1950 – 10 March 1951) ===
- René Pleven – President of the Council
- Robert Schuman – Minister of Foreign Affairs
- Guy Mollet – Minister for the Council of Europe
- Jules Moch – Minister of National Defense
- Henri Queuille – Minister of the Interior
- Maurice Petsche – Minister of Finance and Economic Affairs
- Edgar Faure – Minister of Budget
- Jean-Marie Louvel – Minister of Commerce and Industry
- Paul Bacon – Minister of Labour and Social Security
- René Mayer – Minister of Justice
- Gaston Defferre – Minister of Merchant Marine
- Pierre-Olivier Lapie – Minister of National Education
- Louis Jacquinot – Minister of Veterans and War Victims
- Pierre Pflimlin – Minister of Agriculture
- François Mitterrand – Minister of Overseas France
- Antoine Pinay – Minister of Public Works, Transport, and Tourism
- Pierre Schneiter – Minister of Public Health and Population
- Eugène Claudius-Petit – Minister of Reconstruction and Town Planning
- Charles Brune – Minister of Posts
- Albert Gazier – Minister of Information
- Jean Letourneau – Minister of Relations with Partner States
- Paul Giacobbi – Minister without Portfolio

=== Second Ministry (11 August 1951 – 20 January 1952) ===
- René Pleven – President of the Council
- Georges Bidault – Vice President of the Council and Minister of National Defense
- René Mayer – Vice President of the Council and Minister of Finance and Economic Affairs
- Robert Schuman – Minister of Foreign Affairs
- Charles Brune – Minister of the Interior
- Pierre Courant – Minister of Budget
- Jean-Marie Louvel – Minister of Industry
- Paul Bacon – Minister of Labour and Social Security
- Edgar Faure – Minister of Justice
- André Morice – Minister of Merchant Marine
- André Marie – Minister of National Education
- Emmanuel Temple – Minister of Veterans and War Victims
- Paul Antier – Minister of Agriculture
- Louis Jacquinot – Minister of Overseas France
- Antoine Pinay – Minister of Public Works, Transport, and Tourism
- Paul Ribeyre – Minister of Public Health and Population
- Eugène Claudius-Petit – Minister of Reconstruction and Town Planning
- Joseph Laniel – Minister of Posts
- Robert Buron – Minister of Information
- Pierre Pflimlin – Minister of Commerce and External Economic Relations
- Jean Letourneau – Minister of State
- Maurice Petsche – Minister of State
- Henri Queuille – Minister of State

Changes:

- 16 September 1951 – Minister of State Maurice Petsche dies.
- 4 October 1951 – Joseph Laniel becomes a Minister of State. Roger Duchet succeeds Laniel as Minister of Posts.
- 21 November 1951 – Camille Laurens succeeds Antier as Minister of Agriculture.

Political offices
Preceded by —	Free French Commissioner on Economy and Finances; 1941–1942	Succeeded by André Diethelm
Preceded by —	Free French Commissioner on the Colonies; 1941–1942	Succeeded by Hervé Alphand
Preceded by —	Vice President of the National Committee of the Free French; 1942–1943	Succeeded by —
Preceded by Maurice Dejean	Free French Commissioner for Foreign Affairs; 1942–1943	Succeeded by René Massigli
Preceded by Hervé Alphand	Free French Commissioner on the Colonies; 1942–1944	Succeeded by —
Preceded by Henri Bléhaut	Minister of Colonies; 1944	Succeeded by Paul Giacobbi
Preceded by Aimé Lepercq	Minister of Finance; 1944–1946	Succeeded by André Philipp
Preceded by Pierre Mendès-France	Minister of National Economy; 1945	Succeeded by François Billoux
Preceded by Paul Ramadier	Minister of National Defense; 1949–1950	Succeeded by Jules Moch
Preceded by Henri Queuille	Prime Minister of France; 1950–1951	Succeeded by Henri Queuille
Preceded by —	Vice President of the Council; 1951; With: Guy Mollet and Georges Bidault	Succeeded by —
Preceded by Henri Queuille	Prime Minister of France; 1951–1952	Succeeded by Edgar Faure
Preceded by Georges Bidault	Minister of National Defense; 1952–1954	Succeeded by Marie-Pierre Kœnig
Preceded by Christian Pineau	Minister of Foreign Affairs; 1958	Succeeded by Maurice Couve de Murville
Preceded by Jean-Marcel Jeanneney	Minister of Justice; 1969–1973	Succeeded by Pierre Messmer
