= René Mayer =

71st Prime Minister of France

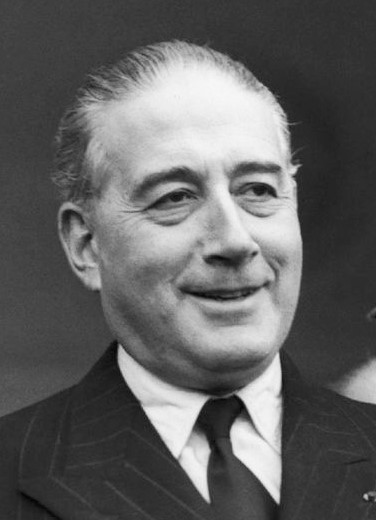
- Mayer in 1949

Prime Minister of France
- In office 8 January 1953 – 28 June 1953
- President: Vincent Auriol
- Preceded by: Antoine Pinay
- Succeeded by: Joseph Laniel

President of the High Authority of the ECSC
- In office 3 June 1955 – 13 January 1958
- Preceded by: Jean Monnet
- Succeeded by: Paul Finet

Personal details
- Born: 4 May 1895 Paris, France
- Died: 13 December 1972 (aged 77) Paris, France
- Party: Republican, Radical and Radical-Socialist Party

René Mayer (French: [ʁəne majɛʁ]; 4 May 1895 – 13 December 1972) was a French Radical politician of the Fourth Republic who served briefly as Prime Minister during 1953.

Mayer was born and died in Paris. In 1939-1940 he was an associate of Jean Monnet in London and later succeeded Monnet as head of the European Coal and Steel Community in Luxembourg, leading the Mayer Authority from 1955 to 1958.

He was France's third Prime Minister of Jewish descent, after Alexandre Millerand and Léon Blum.

== Mayer's Ministry, 8 January – 28 June 1953 ==
- René Mayer – President of the Council
- Henri Queuille – Vice President of the Council
- Georges Bidault – Minister of Foreign Affairs
- René Pleven – Minister of National Defense and Armed Forces
- Charles Brune – Minister of the Interior
- Maurice Bourgès-Maunoury – Minister of Finance
- Robert Buron – Minister of Economic Affairs
- Jean Moreau – Minister of Budget
- Jean-Marie Louvel – Minister of Industry and Energy
- Paul Bacon – Minister of Labour and Social Security
- Léon Martinaud-Déplat – Minister of Justice
- André Marie – Minister of National Education
- Henry Bergasse – Minister of Veterans and War Victims
- Camille Laurens – Minister of Agriculture
- Louis Jacquinot – Minister of Overseas France
- André Morice – Minister of Public Works, Transport, and Tourism
- Paul Ribeyre – Minister of Public Health and Population
- Pierre Courant – Minister of Reconstruction and Town Planning
- Roger Duchet – Minister of Posts
- Paul Ribeyre – Minister of Commerce
- Jean Letourneau – Minister of Relations with Partner States
- Édouard Bonnefous – Minister of State
- Paul Coste-Floret – Minister of State

Changes

- 11 February 1953 – Guy Petit succeeds Ribeyre as Minister of Commerce.

Political offices
New office	Minister of Public Works and Transport; 1944–1945	Succeeded by Jules Moch
Preceded by Robert Schuman	Minister of Finance; 1947–1948	Succeeded by Paul Reynaud
Preceded by Jules Moch	Minister of Economic Affairs; 1947–1948	Succeeded by Paul Reynaud
Preceded by Pierre-Henri Teitgen	Minister of National Defence; 1948	Succeeded by Paul Ramadier
Preceded by Robert Lecourt	Minister of Justice; 1949–1951	Succeeded by Edgar Faure
Preceded by Guy Mollet and René Pleven	Deputy Prime Minister of France; 1951–1952	Succeeded by Henri Queuille
Preceded by Maurice Petsche	Minister of Finance; 1951–1952	Succeeded by Edgar Faure
Preceded by Maurice Petsche	Minister of Economic Affairs; 1951–1952	Succeeded by Robert Buron
Preceded by Antoine Pinay	Prime Minister of France; 1953	Succeeded by Joseph Laniel
