= Henri Queuille =

French politician (1884–1970)

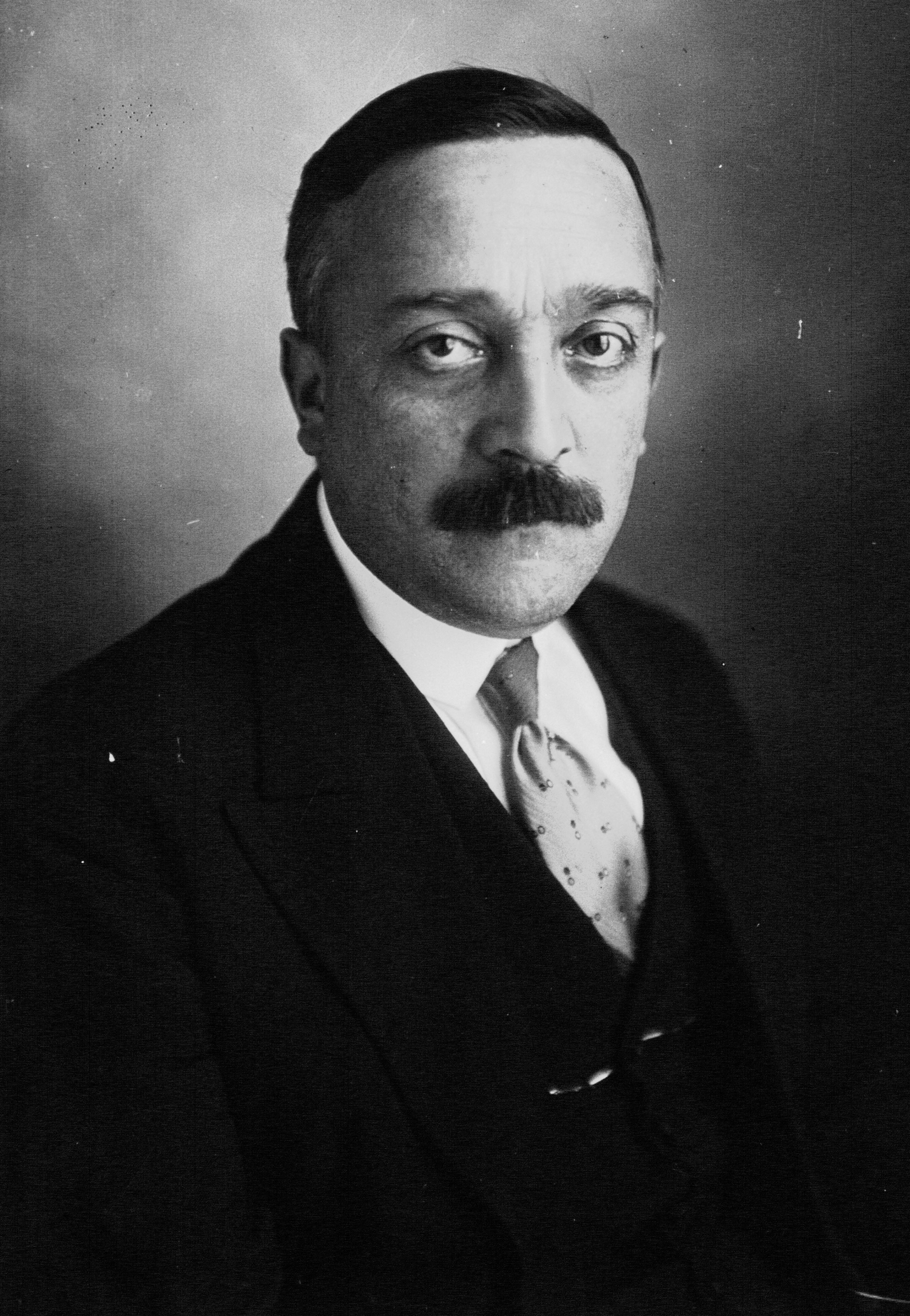
- Queuille in 1929

Prime Minister of France
- In office 10 March 1951 – 11 August 1951
- President: Vincent Auriol
- Preceded by: René Pleven
- Succeeded by: René Pleven
- In office 2 July 1950 – 12 July 1950
- President: Vincent Auriol
- Preceded by: Georges Bidault
- Succeeded by: René Pleven
- In office 11 September 1948 – 28 October 1949
- President: Vincent Auriol
- Preceded by: Robert Schuman
- Succeeded by: Georges Bidault

Personal details
- Born: 31 March 1884 Neuvic, Corrèze
- Died: 15 June 1970 (aged 86) Paris
- Party: Radical

Henri Queuille (French: [ɑ̃ʁi kœj]; 31 March 1884 – 15 June 1970) was a French Radical politician prominent in the Third and Fourth Republics. After World War II, he served three times as Prime Minister.

== Biography ==
=== Early life ===
Henri Queuille was born in Neuvic, where his father, who died when Queuille was 11, was a pharmacist and assistant mayor. He was educated at the school in Tulle, then studied medicine in Paris, where he befriended Georges Duhamel, also a medical student.

He returned to Neuvic as a general practitioner, and became active in local politics for the Radical-Socialist Party, being elected mayor of Neuvic in 1912 (he would remain mayor, except when removed by the Vichy government 1941–1945, until 1965), a councillor for the Canton of Neuvic in 1913, and a member of the Chamber of Deputies for Ussel in 1914.

During World War I, Queuille served as a military hospital doctor. He saw service at the Battle of Verdun and the Battle of the Somme, and was awarded the Croix de Guerre in September 1916.

=== Interwar Period ===
Having been elected a deputy in 1914, Queuille was re-elected at every election until he stood down in 1936, having become a senator for Corrèze in 1935. In local politics, he remained mayor of Neuvic, and additionally became president of the departmental council of Corrèze in 1921.

He first took ministerial office in 1920, as Under-Secretary for Agriculture. Appointed Minister for Agriculture in 1924, he held this post in numerous governments in the 1920s and 1930s. He also served as Minister for Public Health in 1930–31 and 1934–35, Minister for Post and Telecommunications in 1932, and Minister for Public Works in 1937–38, in which position he achieved the nationalisation of the railways, creating the SNCF.

Along with many other leading Radical-Socialist politicians, he was implicated in the Stavisky affair involving the fraudulent financier Alexandre Stavisky, which forced the resignation of Prime Minister Camille Chautemps in 1934.

=== World War II ===
Queuille served as Minister for Supply in the government of Paul Reynaud in 1940. As a senator, he was present at the vote in Vichy on 10 July 1940 which granted all government powers to Marshal Philippe Pétain; Queuille abstained. He returned to Neuvic, where he was removed as mayor by the Vichy government in July 1941.

In 1942, the French Resistance leader Claude Hettier de Boislambert, who passed through Neuvic while in hiding, informed Queuille that General Charles de Gaulle considered it of great importance that Queuille should come round to the Free French cause. After a first failed attempt, Queuille gained passage to London in April 1943, on board an RAF Lysander. A few days later, he broadcast an appeal to the Resistance on the BBC, intended for a rural French audience.

Queuille was appointed to de Gaulle's French Committee of National Liberation based in Algiers in November 1943, becoming its Vice-President, and became a minister of the Provisional Government of the French Republic on its formation in June 1944, sometimes presiding in the absence of General de Gaulle.

=== Fourth Republic ===
In the 1945 legislative election, Queuille was defeated for the only time in his career. However, he returned as mayor of Neuvic, and to the Chamber of Deputies in 1946. He was a minister in every government from 1948 to 1954, leading the government three times (1948–49, 1950, 1951). The middle of his three governments was voted out after two days, the shortest government in French history. He also served as Vice-President of the government (1949–50, 1952–54), Minister of Public Works (1948), Minister for Finance (1948–49, during his first government) and Minister of the Interior (1950–51, spanning his second and third governments).

His governments were Third Force coalitions, a centrist bloc opposed to both the Communists and the Gaullists. During his first term, he signed the North Atlantic Treaty establishing NATO. He also worked with Robert Schuman on the process of European integration.

Pierre Mendès France represented the left wing of the Radical-Socialist Party; Queuille was out of step with his politics. He left the government when Mendès France took the premiership in 1954, and left the Radical-Socialist Party in 1956 to found the Republican Centre. During the crisis of May 1958, Queuille opposed de Gaulle's formation of the Fifth Republic, and campaigned against the adoption of the Fifth Republic's constitution. He did not stand in the 1958 legislative election that followed.

== Governments ==
=== First ministry (11 September 1948 – 28 October 1949) ===
- Henri Queuille – President of the Council and Minister of Finance and Economic Affairs
- André Marie – Vice President of the Council and Minister of Justice
- Robert Schuman – Minister of Foreign Affairs
- Paul Ramadier – Minister of National Defense
- Jules Moch – Minister of the Interior
- Robert Lacoste – Minister of Commerce and Industry
- Daniel Mayer – Minister of Labour and Social Security
- André Colin – Minister of Merchant Marine
- Yvon Delbos – Minister of National Education
- Robert Bétolaud – Minister of Veterans and War Victims
- Pierre Pflimlin – Minister of Agriculture
- Paul Coste-Floret – Minister of Overseas France
- Christian Pineau – Minister of Public Works, Transport, and Tourism
- Pierre Schneiter – Minister of Public Health and Population
- Eugène Claudius-Petit – Minister of Reconstruction and Town Planning

Changes:

- 12 January 1949 – Maurice Petsche succeeds Queuille as Minister of Finance and Economic Affairs.
- 13 February 1949 – Robert Lecourt succeeds Marie as Vice President of the Council and Minister of Justice.

=== Second ministry (2 – 12 July 1950) ===
- Henri Queuille – President of the Council and Minister of the Interior
- Georges Bidault – Vice President of the Council
- Robert Schuman – Minister of Foreign Affairs
- René Pleven – Minister of National Defense
- Maurice Petsche – Minister of Finance and Economic Affairs
- Edgar Faure – Minister of Budget
- Jean-Marie Louvel – Minister of Commerce and Industry
- Paul Bacon – Minister of Labour and Social Security
- René Mayer – Minister of Justice
- Lionel de Tinguy du Pouët – Minister of Merchant Marine
- André Morice – Minister of National Education
- Louis Jacquinot – Minister of Veterans and War Victims
- Pierre Pflimlin – Minister of Agriculture
- Paul Coste-Floret – Minister of Overseas France
- Maurice Bourgès-Maunoury – Minister of Public Works, Transport, and Tourism
- Pierre Schneiter – Minister of Public Health and Population
- Eugène Claudius-Petit – Minister of Reconstruction and Town Planning
- Charles Brune – Minister of Posts
- Jean Letourneau – Minister of Information
- Paul Giacobbi – Minister of Civil Service and Administrative Reform
- Paul Reynaud – Minister of Relations with Partner States and the Far East

=== Third ministry (10 March – 11 August 1951) ===
- Henri Queuille – President of the Council and Minister of the Interior
- Guy Mollet – Vice President of the Council and Minister for the Council of Europe
- René Pleven – Vice President of the Council
- Georges Bidault – Vice President of the Council
- Robert Schuman – Minister of Foreign Affairs
- Jules Moch – Minister of National Defense
- Maurice Petsche – Minister of Finance and Economic Affairs
- Edgar Faure – Minister of Budget
- Jean-Marie Louvel – Minister of Commerce and Industry
- Paul Bacon – Minister of Labour and Social Security
- René Mayer – Minister of Justice
- Gaston Defferre – Minister of Merchant Marine
- Pierre-Olivier Lapie – Minister of National Education
- Louis Jacquinot – Minister of Veterans and War Victims
- Pierre Pflimlin – Minister of Agriculture
- François Mitterrand – Minister of Overseas France
- Antoine Pinay – Minister of Public Works, Transport, and Tourism
- Pierre Schneiter – Minister of Public Health and Population
- Eugène Claudius-Petit – Minister of Reconstruction and Town Planning
- Charles Brune – Minister of Posts
- Albert Gazier – Minister of Information
- Jean Letourneau – Minister of Relations with Partner States

Political offices
Preceded by Joseph Capus	Minister of Agriculture; 1924–1925	Succeeded by Jean Durand
Preceded by François Binet	Minister of Agriculture; 1926–1928	Succeeded by Jean Hennessy
Preceded by Jean Hennessy	Minister of Agriculture; 1930	Succeeded by Fernand David
Preceded by Désiré Ferry	Minister of Public Health; 1930–1931	Succeeded by Camille Blaisot
Preceded by Louis Rollin	Minister of Posts, Telegraphs and Telephones; 1932	Succeeded by Laurent Eynac
Preceded by Abel Gardey	Minister of Agriculture; 1932–1934	Succeeded by Émile Casset
Preceded by Louis Marin	Minister of Public Health and Physical Education; 1934–1935	Succeeded by Louis Lafont
Preceded by Albert Bedouce	Minister of Public Works; 1937–1938	Succeeded by Jules Moch
Preceded by Georges Monnet	Minister of Agriculture; 1938–1940	Succeeded by Paul Thellier
Preceded by (none)	Minister of Supply; 1940	Succeeded by Albert Chichery
Preceded by (none)	Minister of State; 1948	Succeeded by (none)
Preceded by Christian Pineau	Minister of Public Works, Transport and Tourism; 1948	Succeeded by Christian Pineau
Preceded by Robert Schuman	Prime Minister of France; 1948–1949	Succeeded by Georges Bidault
Preceded by Christian Pineau	Minister of Finance and Economic Affairs; 1948–1949	Succeeded by Maurice Petsche
Preceded by Robert Lecourt	Deputy Prime Minister of France; 1949–1950	Succeeded by Georges Bidault
Preceded by Georges Bidault	Prime Minister of France; 1950	Succeeded by René Pleven
Preceded by Jules Moch	Minister of the Interior; 1950–1951	Succeeded by Charles Brune
Preceded by René Pleven	Prime Minister of France; 1951	Succeeded by René Pleven
Preceded by (none)	Minister of State; 1951–1952	Succeeded by François Mitterrand
Preceded by René Mayer	Deputy Prime Minister of France; 1952–1954	Succeeded by (none)
