= Deputy Prime Minister of France =

1871–1958 ministerial office

Vice President of the Council of Minister
- Vice-président du Conseil des ministres
- Government of France
- Status: Deputy prime minister; Second-highest in rank
- Member of: Council of Ministers
- Reports to: Prime Minister (President of the Council)
- Nominator: Prime Minister
- Appointer: President
- Formation: 2 September 1871; 155 years ago
- First holder: Jules Armand Dufaure
- Final holder: Guy Mollet
- Abolished: 28 May 1958; 68 years ago

The deputy prime minister of France was a position which existed at times in the government of France between 1870 and 1958. It was titled vice president of the Council of Ministers (French: vice-président du Conseil des ministres) from 1871, or vice president of the Council for short.

It was in itself a sinecure, used to grant seniority immediately after the prime minister to one important member of the government, later up to three at the same time, but without specific duty or power, or any role as designated acting prime minister. However, in 1871–1876 and 1940–1942, it was actually used for the de facto prime minister, as the position was nominally held by the head of state.

== Position ==
=== As deputy ===
The position of deputy prime minister existed only occasionally during the Third Republic (1870–1940, starting only in the 1910s), the Provisional Government of the French Republic (1944–1946), and the Fourth Republic (1946–1958).

As for all other members of the government, the appointment, or removal, was formally by the head of state, but bowing to the decision of the prime minister.

Although it implied a role of deputy head of government, the position was in itself a sinecure, which brought seniority right after the prime minister (president of the Council), but came without any specific duty or power unless arranged by separate decisions, or any role as designated acting prime minister. The holder sometimes concurrently served as minister for a specific government department, as did the prime minister at the end of the Third Republic, but was otherwise a top-ranking minister without portfolio, with informal responsibilities. A responsibility was however directly assigned to the vice presidency on two occasions, in 1938–1940 when Camille Chautemps was put in charge of coordination of the recently established Office of the Prime Minister, and in 1951 when Guy Mollet was in charge of the Council of Europe. There was initially only one holder at a time, while a position of minister of state, which ranked higher than ordinary ministers, could be granted to several members, also with or without portfolio; there were however up to three vice presidencies in later governments.

Depending on the political situation, it could reflect the personal standing of the holder, especially if he was a former prime minister, or his role as leader or representative of an important party of the government combination, especially for the two junior parties of the tripartisme in 1946–1947. Positions of minister of state were already used for the same purpose since the 19th century; deputy prime ministers ranked above these when both existed at the same time, making it possible for the prime minister to draw up a subtle order of seniority.

The first holder was Aristide Briand in 1914, chosen at the start of World War I by René Viviani; as the government had partially transferred from Paris to Bordeaux, this enabled him to deputize for Vivani, or for the foreign and war ministers, when they came and went between the two cities. Viviani was also the first prime minister not holding a specific portfolio in order to concentrate on the coordination of an expanding state apparatus. The last was Guy Mollet in 1958.

An equivalent position had also existed in a provisional government, the Government of National Defence (1870–1871), which had a vice president (vice-président du Gouvernement de la défense nationale).

=== As head of government ===
In two short periods, the title was however used for the de facto head of government himself, because the head of state formally held the position of prime minister as well.

In 1871, for lack of a permanent constitution, Adolphe Thiers was installed as chief executive of the French Republic in February; while the Rivet Law granted him the title of president of the Republic in August, this was in compensation for a restriction of his powers by the National Assembly, under which ministers were made responsible to the assembly. As he wanted to maintain a direct involvement in government business and kept the additional position of prime minister, the minister to whom he delegated the leadership of the quasi-national government formed in February on 2 September, the minister of justice Jules Armand Dufaure, received the title of vice president of the Council. His successor Patrice de MacMahon left a larger degree of autonomy to his deputy. After republicans won the 1876 legislative election, MacMahon, a monarchist, accepted to appoint a republican ministry, but on 9 March transferred the title of president of the Council to its leader, Dufaure again, in order to stress that he took no responsibility for it. In his government statement, Dufaure defined his new position by declaring that he had been “chosen by the President of the Republic to exercise in his name the powers conferred on him by the Constitution”. (Note: Dufaure, Jules (14 March 1876). "Déclaration faire au nom du Gouvernement, par M. Dufaure, garde des sceaux, président du conseil". Annales du Sénat et de la Chambre des députés. Session ordinaire de 1876. Sénat – Séance du mardi 14 mars 1876 (Government statement) (in French). Vol. 1: Du 8 mars au 11 avril 1876. Paris: Imprimerie et Librairie du Journal officiel (published 1876). p. 52 – via Gallica. Quoted by Massot 1996, p. 49.)

At the start of the Vichy Regime (1940–1944), Philippe Pétain, the last prime minister of the Third Republic who proclaimed himself head of the French State, made Pierre Laval the leading minister when he re-appointed him as his deputy on 12 July. Pétain dismissed and replaced Laval a few months later, but he was eventually forced by the German occupation authorities to recall him with increased prerogatives on 18 April 1942, upon which he granted him the title of head of the Government (chef du Gouvernement), even though he himself nominally kept the title of president of the Council.

== List ==
Holder and concurrent position	Government	Term of office		Party
=== Third Republic === Third Republic (1870–1940)
==== 1870–1871 ==== 1870–1871 (vice president of the Government of National Defence)
Jules Favre; Minister of Foreign Affairs	National; Defence	4 September 1870	13 February 1871	Moderate; Republicans
==== 1871–1876 ==== 1871–1876
Main listing: List of prime ministers of France § Presidents of the Council of Ministers 4
==== 1876–1940 ==== 1876–1940
Aristide Briand (Note: Some were not formally granted the position, but are commonly described as having been deputy as a matter of political arrangement: Briand, Viviani, and Hubert. Caillaux was the first to be legally appointed to the position, explicitly included in his appointment decree.) (Note: Former prime minister.) (Note: Formed the next government.); Minister of Justice	2nd Viviani	26 August 1914	29 October 1915	PRS
René Viviani (Note: Prime minister of the previous government.); Minister of Justice	5th Briand	29 October 1915	12 December 1916	PRS
Position in abeyance
Joseph Caillaux; Minister of Finance	10th Briand	23 June 1926	23 July 1926	Radical
Position in abeyance
Lucien Hubert; Minister of Justice	1st Tardieu	3 November 1929	24 February 1930	Radical
Position in abeyance
Paul Reynaud (1st); Minister of Justice and for the Control of Public Administrations	3rd Tardieu	20 February 1932	3 June 1932	AD
Position in abeyance
Albert Dalimier; Minister of Justice	1st Sarraut	26 October 1933	24 November 1933	Radical
Position in abeyance
Édouard Daladier (1st); Minister of National Defence and War	1st Blum	4 June 1936	21 June 1937	Radical (Note: Party leader.)
Léon Blum (1st)	3rd Chautemps	23 June 1937	14 January 1938	SFIO
Édouard Daladier (2nd–3rd); Minister of National Defence and War	4th Chautemps, 2nd Blum	18 January 1938	8 April 1938	Radical
Camille Chautemps (1st); In charge of coordination of the Office of the Prime Minister	3rd Daladier	10 April 1938	20 March 1940	Radical
Camille Chautemps (2nd); Minister of Coordination (of the Office of the Prime Minister)	Reynaud	21 March 1940	16 June 1940	Radical
Philippe Pétain; Minister of State	Reynaud	18 May 1940 (joined)	16 June 1940	Independent
Camille Chautemps (3rd); Minister of State	Pétain	16 June 1940	11 July 1940	Radical
Pierre Laval (1st); Minister of State	Pétain	23 June 1940 (joined)	11 July 1940	Independent
=== Vichy Regime === Vichy Regime (1940–1944)
Main listing: List of prime ministers of France § Vice-Presidents of the Council of Ministers
=== Provisional Government of the French Republic === Provisional Government of the French Republic (1944–1946) (Note: The title of vice president of the Council of Ministers was used again although the head of government was chairman of the Provisional Government, not president of the Council.)
Francisque Gay	Gouin	26 January 1946	12 June 1946	MRP
Maurice Thorez (1st)	Gouin	26 January 1946	12 June 1946	PCF
Félix Gouin	1st Bidault	24 June 1946	28 November 1946	SFIO
Maurice Thorez (2nd)	1st Bidault	24 June 1946	28 November 1946	PCF
=== Fourth Republic === Fourth Republic (1946–1958)
Pierre-Henri Teitgen (1st); Minister of State (from 4 May: in charge of the Civil Service and Administrative Reform)	1st Ramadier	22 January 1947	21 October 1947	MRP
Maurice Thorez (3rd); Minister of State	1st Ramadier	22 January 1947	4 May 1947 (dismissed)	PCF
Position in abeyance
Pierre-Henri Teitgen (2nd)	Marie	26 July 1948	28 August 1948	MRP
Léon Blum (2nd)	Marie	26 July 1948	28 August 1948	SFIO
André Marie (1st)	2nd Schuman	5 September 1948	11 September 1948	Radical
André Marie (2nd); Minister of Justice	1st Queuille	11 September 1948	13 February 1949 (resigned)	Radical
Robert Lecourt; Minister of Justice	1st Queuille	13 February 1949 (joined)	5 October 1949	MRP
Henri Queuille (1st)	2nd Bidault	28 October 1949	7 February 1950	Radical
Jules Moch; Minister of the Interior	2nd Bidault	28 October 1949	7 February 1950	SFIO
Henri Queuille (2nd); Minister of the Interior	3rd Bidault	7 February 1950	24 June 1950	Radical
Georges Bidault (1st)	2nd Queuille	2 July 1950	4 July 1950	MRP
Position in abeyance
Georges Bidault (2nd)	3rd Queuille	10 March 1951	10 July 1951	MRP
René Pleven	3rd Queuille	10 March 1951	10 July 1951	UDSR
Guy Mollet (1st); In charge of the Council of Europe.	3rd Queuille	10 March 1951	10 July 1951	SFIO
Georges Bidault (3rd); Minister of National Defence	2nd Pleven	11 August 1951	7 January 1952	MRP
René Mayer; Minister of Finance and Economic Affairs	2nd Pleven	11 August 1951	7 January 1952	Radical
Georges Bidault (4th); Minister of National Defence	1st Faure	20 January 1952	28 February 1952	MRP
Henri Queuille (3rd); Minister of State	1st Faure	20 January 1952	28 February 1952	Radical
Position in abeyance
Henri Queuille (4th)	Mayer	8 January 1953	21 May 1953	Radical
Paul Reynaud (2nd)	Laniel	28 June 1953	12 June 1954	CNIP
Henri Queuille (5th)	Laniel	28 June 1953	12 June 1954	Radical
Pierre-Henri Teitgen (3rd)	Laniel	28 June 1953	12 June 1954	MRP
Position in abeyance
Guy Mollet (2nd)	Pflimlin	15 May 1958 (joined)	28 May 1958	SFIO

== Earlier and later systems ==
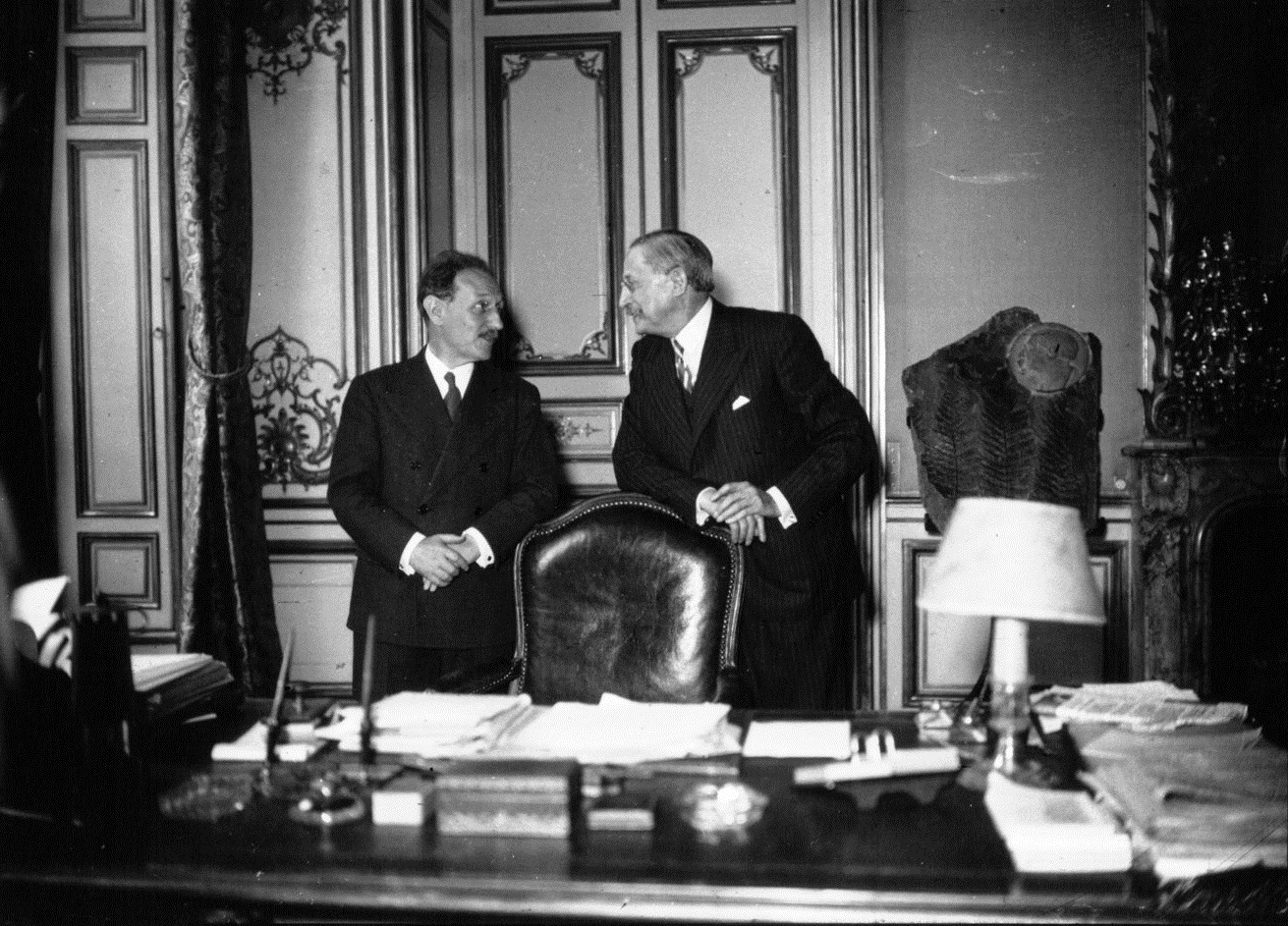
The transfer of the office of prime minister to Camille Chautemps (l.) from Léon Blum (r.), who went on to serve as his deputy.

The meetings of the Council of Ministers have always been chaired by the head of state (emperor, king, president); when the role of head of government emerged in the late 1810s under the Restoration, the title of “president” of that body came to be used, because it included the responsibility to prepare the agenda and the business to be dealt with. This was initially only by convention, and the position or title of head of government had no legal existence until 1830; some other ministers were informally considered second-in-command, but were not commonly called vice president.

During the Second Empire (1852–1870), the position of prime minister had been pointedly abolished by Napoleon III, who led government business in person, but the minister of state, who was ranked first and was close to the Emperor, came to be seen as the primus inter pares, especially when speaking in the name of the Emperor in important parliamentary business.

Although the position of prime minister came in legal existence when it re-emerged in the 1870s, the office did not appear in a French constitution before 1946; that of deputy never did.

A position of deputy prime minister under the Fifth Republic (1958–present), which would be titled vice-Premier ministre to reflect the change in name of the prime ministerial position, has never been granted. The Constitution simply provides that the prime minister "may delegate certain of his powers to ministers" (article 21). Nicolas Hulot, who served as minister for the ecological and solidary transition with the rank of minister of state in the first year of Emmanuel Macron's presidency, had long publicly called for a position of deputy prime minister in charge of the environment, and said that Macron had considered his elevation, but determined that it would be "not constitutional".

== See also ==
- Deputy prime minister – General notion
- Vice President of France – 1848–1852 French government office
- List of prime ministers of France

== Sources ==
- Fessard de Foucault, Bertrand (February 1972). "Les ministres d'État". Revue française de science politique. XXII (1). Paris: Sciences Po: 5–25. doi:10.3406/rfsp.1972.419043 – via Persée.
- Yvert, Benoît (2002). Premiers Ministres et Présidents du Conseil. Histoire et dictionnaire raisonné des chefs du gouvernement en France (1815-2002) (in French). Paris: Perrin. ISBN 2-262-01354-3.
