= Georges Bidault =

French politician (1899–1983)

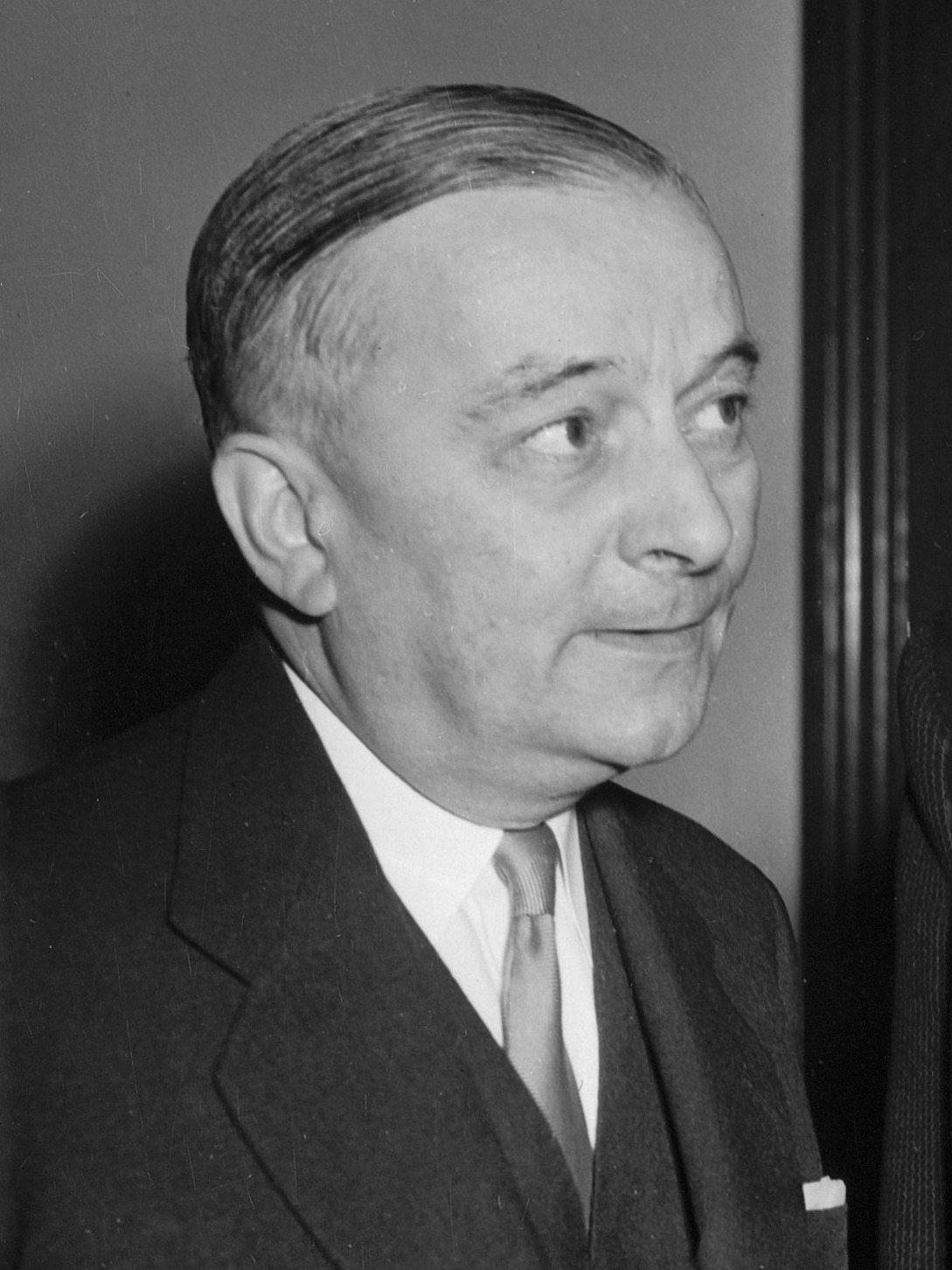
- Bidault in 1953

Chair of the Provisional Government of the French Republic
- In office 24 June 1946 – 16 December 1946
- Prime Minister: Himself
- Preceded by: Félix Gouin
- Succeeded by: Vincent Auriol (President of France); Léon Blum (Prime Minister of France)

Prime Minister of France
- In office 28 October 1949 – 2 July 1950
- President: Vincent Auriol
- Preceded by: Henri Queuille
- Succeeded by: Henri Queuille
- In office 24 June 1946 – 16 December 1946
- President: Himself
- Preceded by: Félix Gouin
- Succeeded by: Léon Blum

Personal details
- Born: 5 October 1899 Moulins, France
- Died: 27 January 1983 (aged 83) Cambo-les-Bains, France
- Party: Popular Republican Movement

Georges-Augustin Bidault (French: [ʒɔʁʒ bido]; 5 October 1899 – 27 January 1983) was a French politician. During World War II, he was active in the French Resistance. After the war, he served as foreign minister and premier on several occasions. He apparently joined the Organisation armée secrète; however he always denied his involvement.

== Early life ==
Bidault was born in Moulins, Allier. He studied in the Sorbonne and became a college history teacher. In 1932 he helped to found the Catholic Association of French Youth and the left-wing anti-fascist newspaper l'Aube. He had a column in the paper and, among other things, protested against the Munich Agreement in 1938.

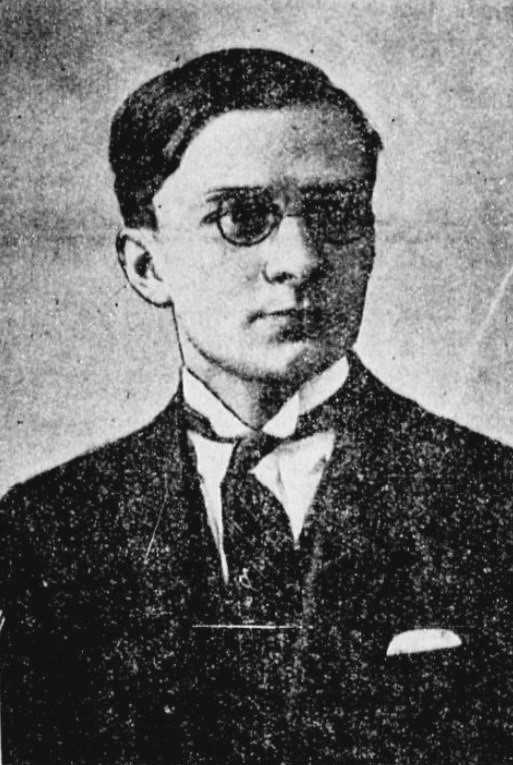
Bidault in 1934

== World War II ==
After the beginning of the Second World War he joined the French army. He was captured during the Fall of France and was imprisoned briefly. After his release in July 1941, he became a teacher at the Lycée du Parc in Lyon and joined the Liberté group of French Resistance that eventually merged with the group Combat. Jean Moulin recruited him to organize a covert press and the Combat covert newspaper.

For his work in the resistance, he was helped by his private administrative assistant Laure Diebold.

Bidault, inter alia along with other people well known, was imprisoned by the Spanish in an Internment camp at Miranda de Ebro.

Bidault participated in the forming of the Conseil National de la Résistance and, after the Gestapo captured Moulin, he became its new president. In 1944 he formed a Resistance Charter that recommended an extensive post-war reform program. After the liberation of Paris he represented the Resistance in the victory parade. Charles de Gaulle appointed him as a foreign minister of his provisional government on 25 August. He was the initiator of the society Popular Republican Movement (MRP).

He was chief of the French delegation to the San Francisco Conference, which established the UN, from April to June 1945. At the conference, France succeeded in gaining a permanent seat on the Security Council.

== Fourth Republic ==
On 4 January 1946, Bidault married Suzanne Borel, the first French woman to be employed as a diplomat. The same year he served as foreign minister in Félix Gouin's provisional government. On 19 June 1946, the National Constituent Assembly elected him as president of the provisional government. His government, formed on 15 June, was composed of socialists, communists and Bidault's own MRP. In social policy, Bidault's government was notable for passing important pension and workman's compensation laws. An act of 22 August 1946 extended coverage of family allowances to practically the entire population, while a law of October 1946 provided that insurance of occupation risks "would henceforth be mandatory and that such insurance would be granted by the Social Security that had been created in 1945." In August 1946, an Act was passed that made provision for two days' holiday a month up to a maximum of 24 working days for young persons between the ages of 14 and 18 and for one-and-a-half days' a month up to a maximum of 18 working days for those aged between 18 and 21. In addition, an Act was passed on 11 October 1946 that introduced occupational medical services.

Bidault later became foreign minister once again. The government held elections for the National Assembly on 29 November after which Bidault resigned. His successor was Léon Blum.

Bidault served various French governments, first as foreign minister for Paul Ramadier and Robert Schuman. In April 1947 he endorsed Ramadier's decision to expel the Communists from his government. Bidault had recently been to Moscow and was disturbed by the Soviet regime; he believed an agreement with Stalin was impossible. In 1948, weapons valued at 153 million francs were donated to Israel by the French government, in accordance with a secret agreement approved by Bidault. Bidault's reasons for this are unclear, albeit he had been very concerned about the possibility of a Jordanian takeover of Jerusalem. Deputy Chief of Staff General Henri Coudraux, who was involved in the operation, told a 1949 inquiry that France had "reached a secret agreement with the Irgun, which promised it advantages if it were to come into power [in Israel]." A significant portion of the weapons and the ammunition were later destroyed in the Altalena Affair.

In 1949 he became the President of the Council of Ministers (premier) but his government lasted only 8 months. During his last term as premier, a law of February 1950 that regulated collective bargaining, and included a guarantee of the right of workers to strike. The same law required the government to fix minimum wages for agriculture and for industry. In Henri Queuille's governments in 1950–1951 he had the office of deputy prime minister and for René Pleven and Edgar Faure also the post of defense minister.

In 1952 Bidault became honorary president of MRP. On 1 June 1953 President Vincent Auriol assigned him to form his own government but the National Assembly refused to give him the official mandate on 10 June. In 1953 Bidault became a presidential candidate but withdrew after the second round.

Bidault was foreign minister during the siege of the French garrison at Dien Bien Phu from March to May 1954. He protested to the Red Cross that the Viet Minh were shooting at clearly marked French medical evacuation flights, killing some of the evacuees. The ongoing fighting in Indochina had exhausted him; he was described by American secretary of state John Foster Dulles as "a deeply harassed man" and later by a historian as "on the verge of a nervous breakdown". Caught between his desires to end the war and to maintain French rule over its colonies, he vacillated between pressing the war, perhaps by asking the Americans for air support, or seeking a negotiated solution. Bidault stated that John Foster Dulles (then Secretary of State of United States) offered France two atomic bombs in 1954.

== Fifth Republic ==
In April 1958 Bidault again became premier but did not form a cabinet and helped form the conservative society Christian Democratic Movement. He also endorsed De Gaulle's presidency after the beginning of the Algerian War of Independence.

In 1961 Bidault became President of the Executive Council of the society Rally for French Algeria and opposed De Gaulle's policy of Algerian independence. He established his own National Resistance Council within the far-right paramilitary organization OAS (Organisation armée secrète). In June 1962 he was accused of conspiring against the state and deprived of his parliamentary immunity. He left for exile in Brazil. In 1967 he relocated to Belgium and in 1968 returned to France after benefiting from an amnesty.

In his political memoirs, Bidault stated that he was never involved with the OAS, and was not qualified to give any precise information about its deeds.

When the Front national was founded in October 1972 by members of Ordre nouveau, he participated but resigned from the organisation a few days later.

Bidault died of a stroke in Cambo-les-Bains in January 1983.

== Governments ==
=== First ministry (24 June – 16 December 1946) ===
- Georges Bidault – Chairman of the Provisional Government and Minister of Foreign Affairs
- Maurice Thorez – Vice President of the Council
- Félix Gouin – Vice President of the Council and Minister of National Defense
- Charles Tillon – Minister of Armaments
- Édouard Depreux – Minister of the Interior
- Robert Schuman – Minister of Finance
- François de Menthon – Minister of National Economy
- Marcel Paul – Minister of Industrial Production
- Ambroise Croizat – Minister of Labour and Social Security
- Pierre-Henri Teitgen – Minister of Justice
- Marcel Edmond Naegelen – Minister of National Education
- François Tanguy-Prigent – Minister of Agriculture
- Yves Farge – Minister of Supply
- Marius Moutet – Minister of Overseas France
- Jules Moch – Minister of Public Works and Transport
- Robert Prigent – Minister of Population
- François Billoux – Minister of Reconstruction and Town Planning
- Jean Letourneau – Minister of Posts
- Alexandre Varenne – Minister of State
- Francisque Gay – Minister of State

=== Second ministry (28 October 1949 – 7 February 1950) ===
- Georges Bidault – President of the Council
- Jules Moch – Vice President of the Council and Minister of the Interior
- Henri Queuille – Vice President of the Council
- Robert Schuman – Minister of Foreign Affairs
- René Pleven – Minister of National Defense
- Maurice Petsche – Minister of Finance and Economic Affairs
- Robert Lacoste – Minister of Commerce and Industry
- Pierre Segelle – Minister of Labour and Social Security
- René Mayer – Minister of Justice
- Yvon Delbos – Minister of National Education
- Louis Jacquinot – Minister of Veterans and War Victims
- Pierre Pflimlin – Minister of Agriculture
- Jean Letourneau – Minister of Overseas France
- Christian Pineau – Minister of Public Works, Transport, and Tourism
- Pierre Schneiter – Minister of Public Health and Population
- Eugène Claudius-Petit – Minister of Reconstruction and Town Planning
- Eugène Thomas – Minister of Posts
- Pierre-Henri Teitgen – Minister of State

Changes:

- 2 December 1949 – Gabriel Valay succeeds Pflimlin as Minister of Agriculture

=== Third Ministry (7 February – 2 July 1950) ===
- Georges Bidault – President of the Council
- Henri Queuille – Vice President of the Council and Minister of the Interior
- Robert Schuman – Minister of Foreign Affairs
- René Pleven – Minister of National Defense
- Maurice Petsche – Minister of Finance and Economics Affairs
- Jean-Marie Louvel – Minister of Commerce and Industry
- Paul Bacon – Minister of Labour and Social Security
- René Mayer – Minister of Justice
- Yvon Delbos – Minister of National Education
- Louis Jacquinot – Minister of Veterans and War Victims
- Gabriel Valay – Minister of Agriculture
- Jean Letourneau – Minister of Overseas France
- Jacques Chastellain – Minister of Public Works, Transport, and Tourism
- Pierre Schneiter – Minister of Public Health and Population
- Eugène Claudius-Petit – Minister of Reconstruction and Town Planning
- Charles Brune – Minister of Posts
- Pierre-Henri Teitgen – Minister of State

Political offices
Preceded by Pierre Laval	Minister of Foreign Affairs; 1944–46	Succeeded by Léon Blum
Preceded by Félix Gouin	Chairman of the Provisional Government; 1946	Succeeded by Léon Blum
Preceded by Léon Blum	Minister of Foreign Affairs; 1947–48	Succeeded by Robert Schuman
Preceded by Henri Queuille	President of the Council of Ministers; 1949–50	Succeeded by Henri Queuille
Preceded by Henri Queuille	Vice President of the Council of Ministers; 1950	Succeeded by —
Preceded by —	Vice President of the Council of Ministers; 1951–52	Succeeded by —
Preceded by Jules Moch	Minister of National Defense; 1951–52	Succeeded by René Pleven
Preceded by Robert Schuman	Minister of Foreign Affairs; 1953–54	Succeeded by Pierre Mendès France

== Sources and further reading ==
- Bidault, Georges. Resistance: The Political Autobiography of Georges Bidault (Praeger, 1965) online
- Morgan, T. (2010). Valley of Death: The Tragedy at Dien Bien Phu That Led America into the Vietnam War. New York: Random House. pp. 50–51. ISBN 9781400066643.
