= Maurice Thorez =

Former leader of the French Communist Party (1900–1964)

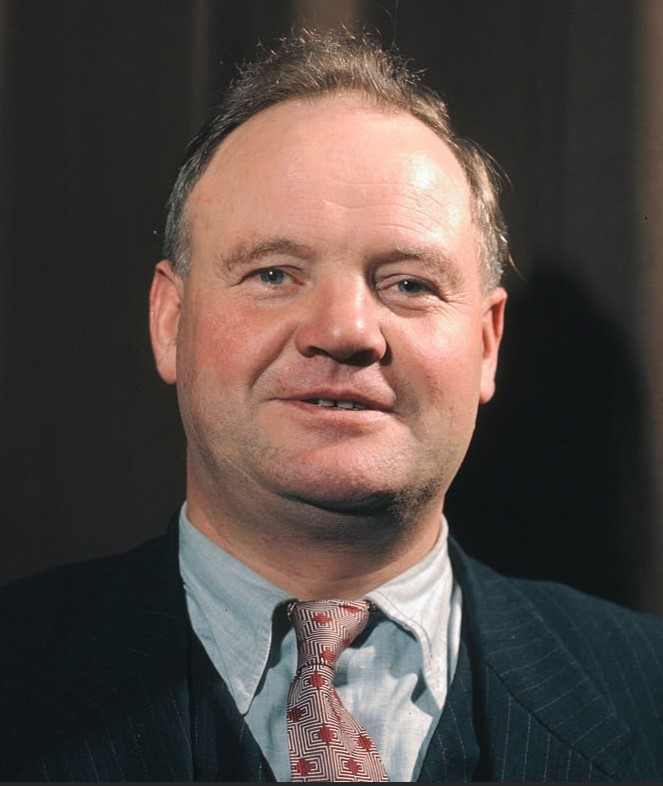
- Thorez in 1947

Deputy Prime Minister of the Provisional Government of the French Republic
- In office 22 January 1947 – 4 May 1947
- Prime Minister: Paul Ramadier
- Succeeded by: Pierre-Henri Teitgen
- In office 24 June 1946 – 28 November 1946
- Prime Minister: Georges Bidault
- In office 26 January 1946 – 12 June 1946
- Prime Minister: Félix Gouin

Minister of State
- In office 22 January 1947 – 4 May 1947
- Prime Minister: Paul Ramadier
- In office 21 November 1945 – 20 January 1946
- Prime Minister: Charles de Gaulle

General Secretary of the French Communist Party
- In office 18 July 1930 – 17 May 1964
- Preceded by: Pierre Semard
- Succeeded by: Jacques Duclos (interim; 1950–1953); Waldeck Rochet

Personal details
- Born: 28 April 1900 Noyelles-Godault, Pas-de-Calais, France
- Died: 11 July 1964 (aged 64) Black Sea, Bulgaria
- Party: PCF
- Other political affiliations: SFIO (1919–1920)
- Spouse: Jeannette Vermeersch (m. 1947)
- Children: 3
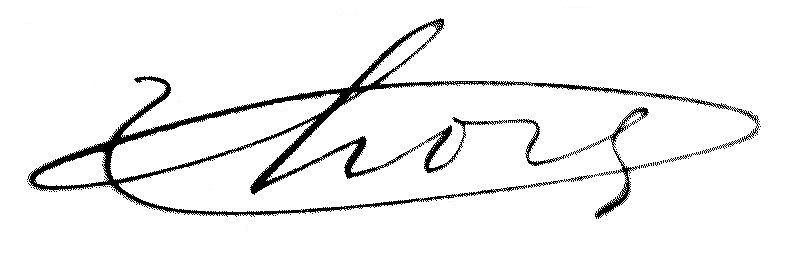
- Signature

Maurice Thorez (French: [mɔʁis tɔʁɛz, moʁ-]; 28 April 1900 – 11 July 1964) was a French politician and longtime leader of the French Communist Party (PCF) from 1930 until his death. He also served as Deputy Prime Minister of France from 1946 to 1947.

== Pre-war ==
Thorez, born in Noyelles-Godault, Pas-de-Calais, became a coal miner at the age of 12. He joined the French Section of the Workers' International (SFIO) in 1919 and was imprisoned several times for his political activism. After the 1920 split in the SFIO led to the formation of the French Communist Party (PCF) in December 1920, Thorez became party secretary in 1923 and, in 1930, general secretary of the party, a position he held until his death. After he took office as secretary general, he was supported by Soviet leader Joseph Stalin and the Communist Party of the Soviet Union. Throughout his tenure, Thorez was a Stalinist.

In 1932 Thorez became the companion of Jeannette Vermeersch; they had three sons before marrying in 1947, and remained married until his death.

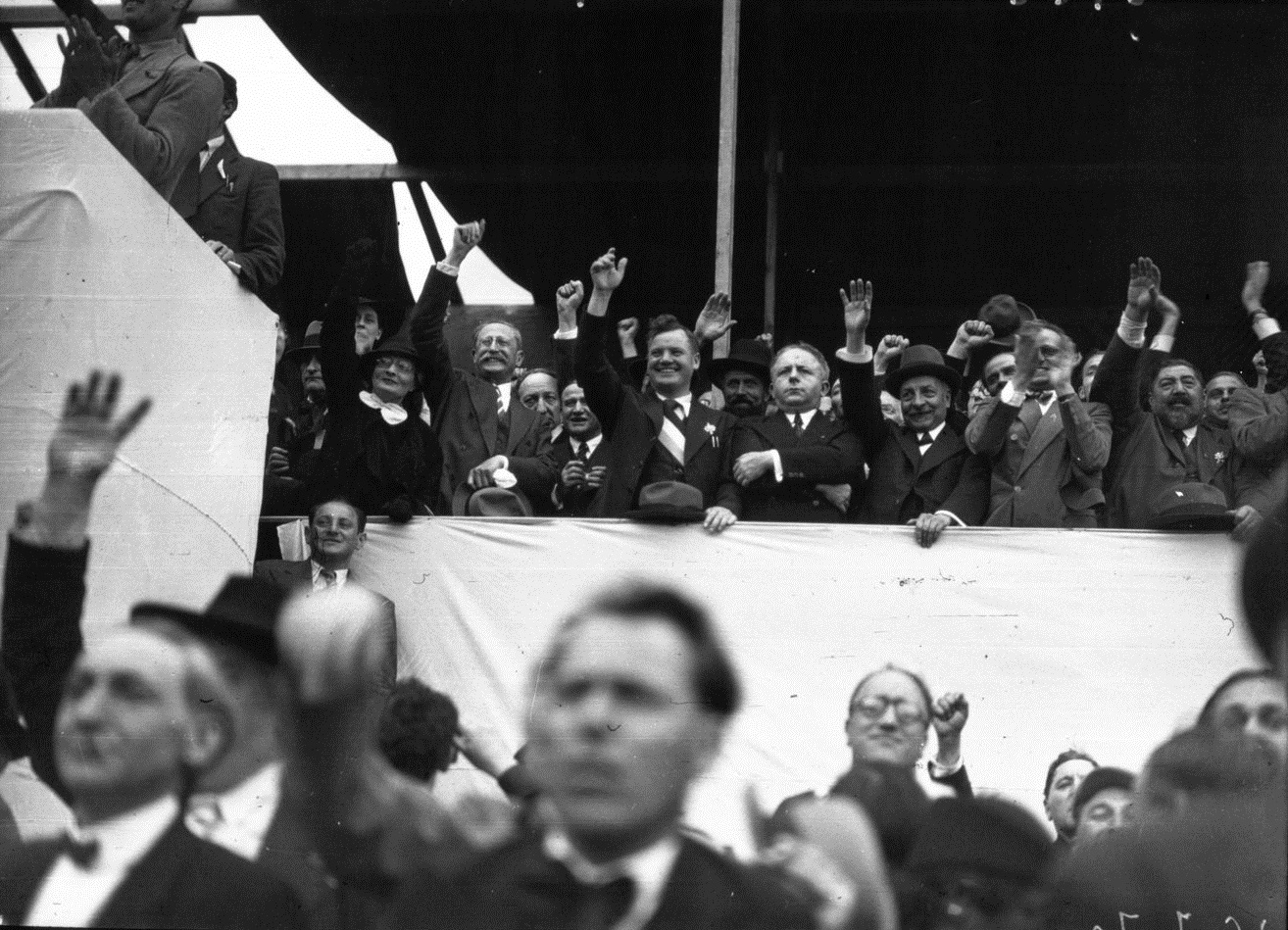
Popular Front leaders during a Bastille Day demonstration in Paris, 14 July 1936. On the tribune (front row, left to right): Thérèse Blum, Leon Blum, Thorez, Roger Salengro, Maurice Viollette and Pierre Cot.

Thorez was elected to the Chamber of Deputies in 1932 and reelected in 1936. In 1934, following a Comintern directive, he helped form the Popular Front, an alliance between Communists, Socialists, and radical Socialists. The Front, because of strong popular support as France was reeling from the impact of the Great Depression, won the 1936 election. With the support of the Communists under Thorez, the socialist Léon Blum became Prime Minister of a Popular Front government and managed to enact much of the Front's social-legislation programme. Meanwhile, Thorez presided over massive growth of the Communist Party, beginning with the elections of 1936.

== World War II ==
Following the Molotov–Ribbentrop Pact of 1939 and the subsequent Soviet response to German invasion of Poland, the Communist Party was against the French war effort against the Soviet Union, because the Daladier government planned to send troops to fight against it. The party was outlawed by the French government on 26 September. The Party supported the Soviet Union's tactical treaty with Germany to direct German aggression away from the USSR and toward the United Kingdom and France. Because they were impeding the fight against the Nazis, the Party's publications were banned, and many Party members were interned. Thorez himself had his passport revoked. Shortly thereafter, he was drafted. On 3 September 1939, Thorez enthusiastically joined his regiment, the 3e RG (3rd Engineer Regiment), in Arras.

Comintern secretary Georgi Dimitrov instructed the French party's leaders to desert after the party was banned. Reluctantly, but dutifully, Thorez deserted on 4 October. Thorez arrived in Moscow on 8 November 1939, via Belgium, Stockholm, and Riga. In Moscow, he seems to have been kept on a rather tight leash. In his absence, Thorez was sentenced for desertion on 25 November to six years' imprisonment. On 17 February 1940, he was deprived of his French citizenship.

Following the German invasion of the Soviet Union in June 1941, the French Communist Party openly declared it would violently resist the German occupation; even before this, the Party organized a demonstration of thousands of students and workers against the occupation on 11 November 1940, and in May 1941 organized a strike of 100,000 miners in the Nord and Pas-de-Calais departments. During this time, articles written by and ghostwritten for Thorez appeared frequently in the party's underground newspaper, Humanité Clandestine. Each of these letters was signed 'Maurice Thorez, somewhere in France'. It was not until several years after the war that the party admitted that this was false, and that Thorez had been in Moscow for the entire war. In his absence, the affairs of the PCF and of the Francs-Tireurs et Partisans, the party's resistance movement, in France were organised by his second in command, Jacques Duclos.

When the Allied Armies liberated France in 1944, Thorez received a pardon from Charles de Gaulle. After the Liberation, Thorez was ordered by Stalin to lead the PCF immediately after the Second World War to a non-revolutionary road to power. The instructions were not to seize power as had been done elsewhere, but to have the reluctant wartime Communist partisans surrender their weapons, and the party would become a powerful force in the post-war governments, since it thought that it would soon win legally.

== Post-war ==
In November 1944, Thorez returned to France from his exile in the Soviet Union, and in 1945, his citizenship was restored. The PCF emerged from the Second World War as the largest political party in France based on its role in the anti-Nazi resistance movement during the occupation of France, at least after 1941. Thorez was again elected to the Chamber of Deputies and reelected throughout the Fourth Republic (1946–1958).

=== In power ===
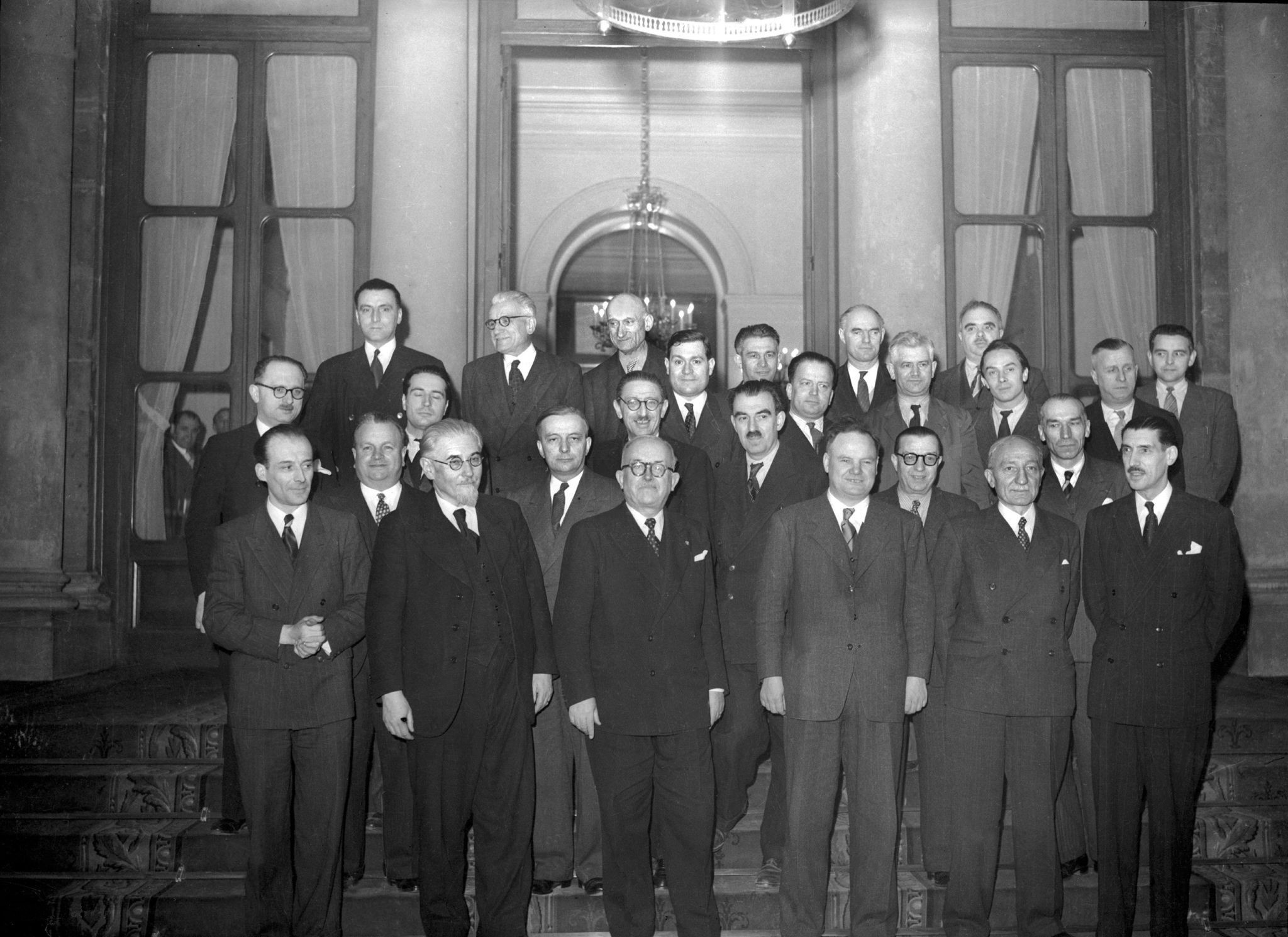
Thorez (front row, third from right) as Deputy Prime Minister in the government of Paul Ramadier, 1947.

Forming a popular front with the Socialist Party in the 1945 elections, Thorez became vice premier of France from 1946 to 1947.

Thorez supported the Democratic Republic of Vietnam in the First Indochina War, but did not fully support the DRV because Thorez and other PCF members wanted to keep their positions as ministers.

By 1947 a combination of the emerging Cold War between the United States and the Soviet Union and growing social conflicts in France, linked to the increasing gap between wages and prices, put the three party union (SFIO, PCF and MRP) under heavy pressure, culminating in the May 1947 crisis. Prime Minister Paul Ramadier received threats from the United States that the presence of Communist ministers in the government would have consequences, such as the blocking of U.S. aid from the coming Marshall Plan, or worse: "I told Ramadier," Jefferson Caffery, then US ambassador to France, wrote in his diary, "no Communists in gov. or else."

Simultaneously, the 1947 strikes in France caused rumours to spread among the non-Communist members of the government that the PCF would attempt a coup d'état on 1 May: Jules Moch, SFIO Public Works Minister, claimed to have "certain information" on preparations of a coup by the PCF. Ramadier is alleged to have worked secretly with Georges Revers, the Army Chief of Staff, to set up a secret transport and communications network within the military to safeguard against such a coup, all without the knowledge of François Billoux, the Communist Minister of Defence. The crisis was also escalated by the beginnings of the colonial war in Vietnam, with the communist deputies in the National Assembly voting against the war.

Combined, that led Ramadier to look for a pretext to dismiss Thorez and his colleagues from the ruling coalition. On 4 May, the PCF ministers voted against the government over deflationary policies such as wage and price controls, which was given as the reason for the PCF ministers being forced out of the ruling coalition on 7 May 1947. Thorez later recalled the May 1947 events:

All my colleagues were full of praises and kindnesses for us – they were prodigal with their declarations of appeasement. Ramadier told us: 'I have no reproaches to make of you. You have always been loyal.' And Teitgen came forward to say 'We shall miss you a lot!' They all threw flowers on us, the better to bury us. I knew that Ramadier was cooking up something bad, but never did I think he'd go this far…

=== In opposition ===
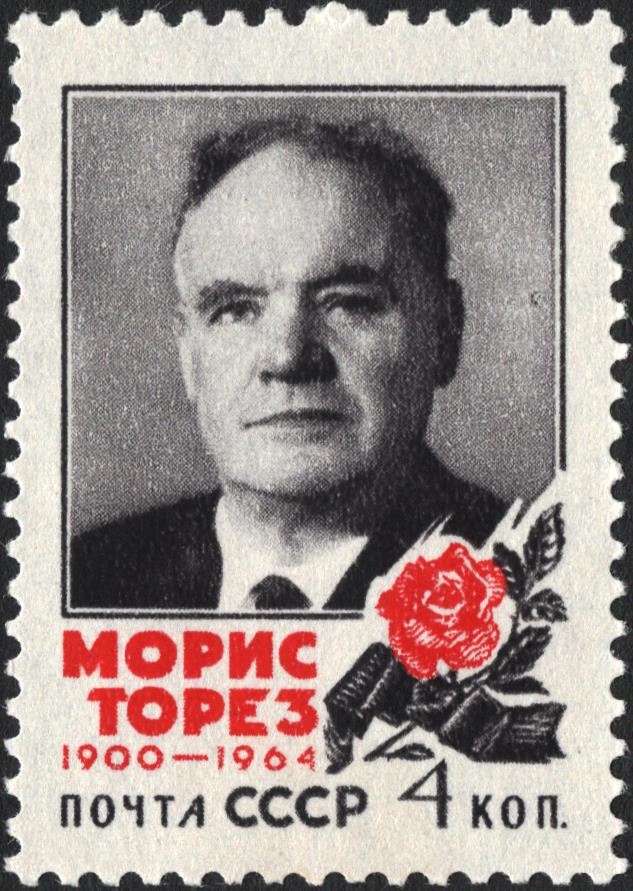
Soviet commemorative postage stamp featuring Thorez issued following his death.

In 1950, at the height of his popularity among party members, Thorez suffered a stroke and remained in the Soviet Union for medical care until 1953. That March, Stalin died, and Thorez was a member of the French delegation to Stalin's funeral. During the absence of Thorez, the party was de facto controlled by Jacques Duclos. Thorez resumed his duties upon returning to France. Although his health had deteriorated, Thorez remained party leader until shortly before he died in 1964 on a Black Sea cruise.

He published in 1937 an autobiography, Fils du peuple (Son of the People, 1938). The book had been written with the help of Jean Fréville, who had inserted in the story a passage where the initials of the words formed the phrase "Fréville a écrit ce livre" ("Fréville wrote this book"). The passage, present on pages 36–37 of the first edition, was deleted in the following editions.

In 1945, he published Une politique de grandeur française (1945; "Politics of French Greatness").

A French research institution linked to the French Communist Party and set up in the mid-1960s was named the Institut Maurice Thorez. The city of Chystiakove in Ukraine was named Thorez between 1964 and 2016. The Moscow State Linguistic University was named the Maurice Thorez Moscow Institute of Foreign Languages (Russian: Московский институт иностранных языков имени Мориса Тореза) between 1964 and 1990.

Party political offices
Preceded by Pierre Semard	Secretary General of the French Communist Party; 1930–1964; Jacques Duclos as acting Secretary General from 1950 to 1953	Succeeded by Waldeck Rochet
Political offices
Preceded by Vacant	Deputy Prime Minister of France; 22 January – 4 May 1947	Succeeded by Pierre-Henri Teitgen
