= Jean Fréville =

French writer, journalist, literary and art critic

Jean Fréville (French: [fʁevil]; born Eugène Schkaff; 25 May 1895 – 23 June 1971) was a French writer, journalist, literary and art critic, translator and historian.

== Biography ==
Eugène Schkaff was born in to an upper-class family in Kharkiv, Russian Empire (now Ukraine) and moved with his parents to France in 1903. He studied at the Lycée Janson-de-Sailly, then took courses in law and philosophy at the École libre des sciences politiques. Holder of two doctorates in law, he registered with the Paris bar in 1925, the year in which he obtained French naturalization.

In 1927, he went to Moscow for the celebrations of the 10th anniversary of the October Revolution. There he met Maurice Thorez and on his return to Paris, he joined the Communist Party. In 1931, he became a literary columnist for l'Humanité under the pseudonym Jean Fréville and publicized the writings of Marx, Engels, Plekhanov, Lenin, and Stalin on art and literature.

A close collaborator of Thorez, he wrote his biography at his request in 1937 (Fils de Peuple), based on descriptions provided orally by Thorez himself. After the German invasion of France he was mobilized in March 1940 and, after his demobilization in July in Nice, he lent his support to the clandestine newspaper of resistance intellectuals, Pensée et action.

After the war, he was deputy head of Thorez's cabinet and became a minister. After the ouster of communist ministers in May 1947, he continued to be a close but discreet collaborator of Maurice Thorez. It was he who made numerous trips to the Soviet Union to meet the ill Thorez.

He was part of the editorial board of La Nouvelle Critique in 1948 and was one of the presidents of the Institut Maurice Thorez.

Despite becoming isolated politically after the death of Thorez in 1964, Jean Fréville remained a member of the PCF until the end of his life in June 1971.
