= André Marie =

French politician (1897–1974)

Prime Minister of France
- In office 26 July 1948 – 5 September 1948
- President: Vincent Auriol
- Preceded by: Robert Schuman
- Succeeded by: Robert Schuman

Minister of National Education
- In office 11 August 1952 – 19 June 1954
- Prime Minister: Antoine Pinay; René Mayer; Joseph Laniel
- Preceded by: Pierre-Olivier Lapie
- Succeeded by: Jean Berthoin

Mayor of Barentin
- In office 1945–1974

Personal details
- Born: 3 December 1897 Honfleur, France
- Died: 12 June 1974 (aged 76) Rouen, France
- Party: Radical
- Education: Lycée Corneille

André Marie (3 December 1897 – 12 June 1974) was a French Radical politician who served as Prime Minister during the Fourth Republic in 1948.

== Early life and education ==
Born at Honfleur, Calvados, the young André Marie studied at primary and secondary level there, going on to the Lycée Corneille, when his parents moved to Rouen in 1908. While preparing to apply to the École Normale Supérieure Lettres et Sciences Humaines, he was mobilised at the end of 1916. By the end of World War I, he commanded a battery of 75 men. He received two light injuries and numerous commendations. He was decorated with the Croix de guerre with palm.

== Early career ==
He started work as a lawyer in 1922. He was elected Deputy for Seine-Inférieure (now Seine-Maritime), holding his seat in the Palais Bourbon from 1928 to 1962. In 1933, André Marie entered the government as Under-Secretary of State to Albert Sarraut, responsible for Alsace-Lorraine. He served in several Under-Secretarial posts, and represented France at the League of Nations.

== World War II ==
As World War II escalated, André Marie, a reserve captain, was one of several parliamentarians who enlisted voluntarily. An artillery captain, he was decorated with a second Croix de Guerre, taken prisoner, and imprisoned at the Oflag at Saarburg. He was therefore absent for the vote of 10 July 1940, which empowered Marshal Pétain and instituted the regime of Vichy France.

Marie was freed in 1941, having served as an officer in both World Wars. Refusing Vichy politics on his return to Seine-Maritime, he resigned all his elected offices, and in a letter to his constituents, explained that he could not exercise his mandate while the people could not be consulted freely. As a member of the Georges-France resistance network, he was denounced and arrested on 12 September 1943 by occupation authorities, imprisoned at Compiègne, then deported to a camp at Buchenwald on 16 December 1943, where he remained until the liberation of the camp by American troops on 11 April 1945. He had lost 30 kilograms, and had suffered a heart infection and a liver infection.

On his return to France, André Marie quickly regained his place in political life, both at departmental and national levels.

== Ministerial career ==
=== Minister of Justice ===
In 1947, he was appointed Minister of Justice in the Ramadier ministry, and presided over the last trials in the High Court of collaborators.

=== Prime Minister of France ===
The President called on him to become Prime Minister, replacing Robert Schuman on 27 July 1948, but he was obliged to resign a month later.

=== Subsequent ministerial offices ===
He accepted the post of Deputy Prime Minister in the Queuille cabinet in 1948, and was again named Minister of Justice, refusing to pursue the Communists after the miners' strikes of 1948. On 3 February 1949, as Minister of Justice, he was called to account in the National Assembly on the matter of the economic collaborator Pierre Brice. The radical Deputy Emmanuel d'Astier de la Vigerie declared: "Men who have amassed fortunes as a result of collaboration are now largely free to enjoy the fruits of their treason because the government, indulgent towards collaborators, has led a politic of repression against the working class." Weakened by the affair, André Marie resigned on 13 February 1949.

He then served as Minister of Education, from August 1951 until June 1954. He brought about the Marie and Barangé laws, in support of free education. An ardent proponent of public education, he brought about the law, still in place, which makes students of the écoles normales supérieures trainee civil servants: in exchange for a monthly salary, they may be asked to serve the government at any point during the ten years following their matriculation.

== Municipal office ==
As Mayor of Barentin from 1945 to 1974, he installed the statues of the town's famous "street museum". He died, aged 76, in Rouen.

== Ministry (26 July – 5 September 1948) ==
- André Marie - President of the Council
- Pierre-Henri Teitgen - Vice President of the Council
- Léon Blum - Vice President of the Council
- Robert Schuman - Minister of Foreign Affairs
- René Mayer - Minister of National Defense
- Jules Moch - Minister of the Interior
- Paul Reynaud - Minister of Finance and Economic Affairs
- Robert Lacoste - Minister of Commerce and Industry
- Daniel Mayer - Minister of Labour and Social Security
- Robert Lecourt - Minister of Justice
- Yvon Delbos - Minister of National Education
- André Maroselli - Minister of Veterans and War Victims
- Pierre Pflimlin - Minister of Agriculture
- Paul Coste-Floret - Minister of Overseas France
- Christian Pineau - Minister of Public Works and Transport
- Pierre Schneiter - Minister of Public Health and Population
- René Coty - Minister of Reconstruction and Town Planning
- Henri Queuille - Minister of State
- Paul Ramadier - Minister of State

Political offices
Preceded by Paul Ramadier	Minister of Justice; 1947–1948	Succeeded by Rober Lecourt
Preceded by Robert Schuman	Prime Minister of France; 1948	Succeeded by Robert Schuman
Preceded by Pierre-Olivier Lapie	Minister of National Education; 1951–1954	Succeeded by Jean Berthoin
