= Gaston Defferre =

French politician (1910–1986)

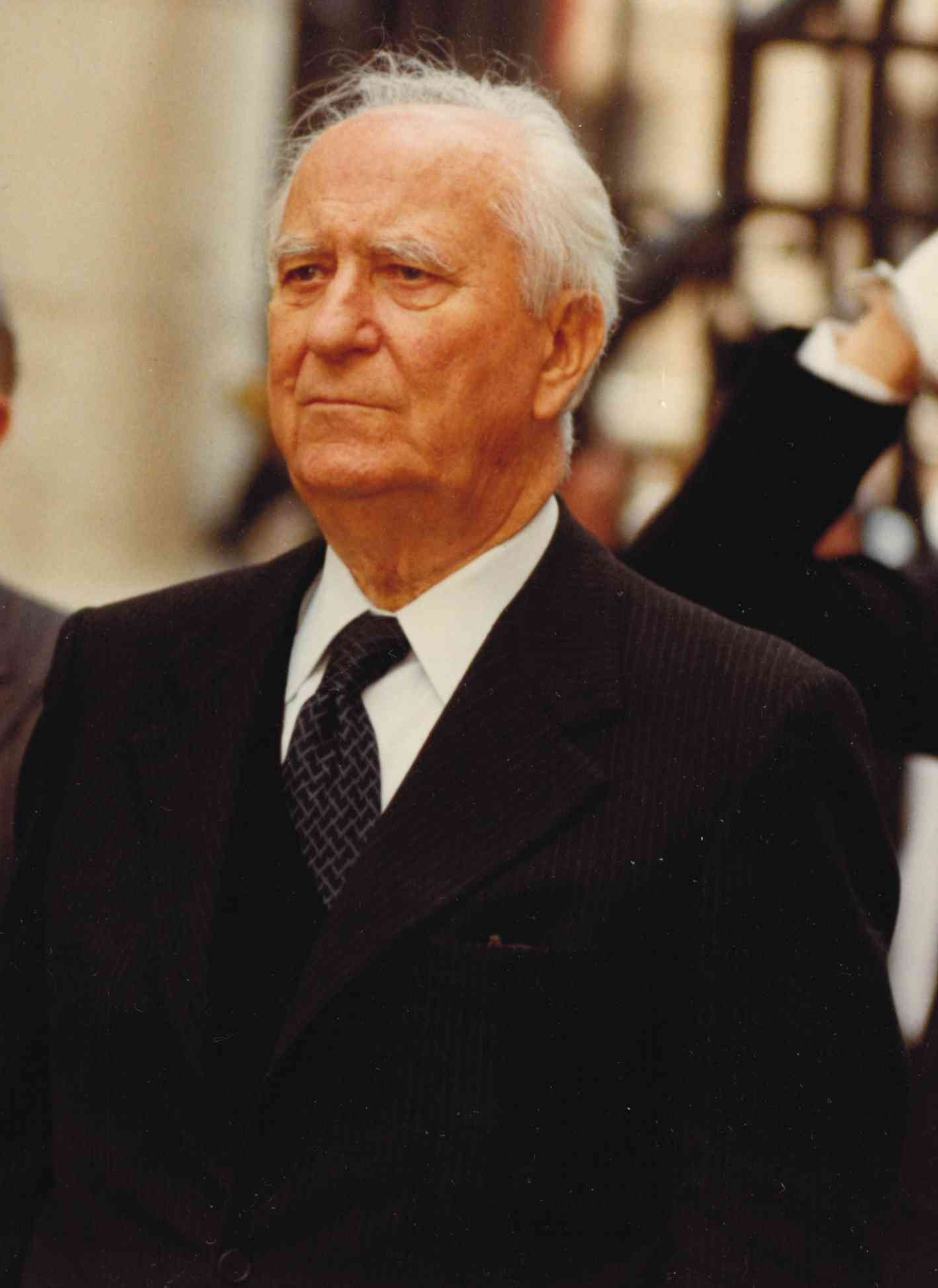
- Defferre in 1981

Mayor of Marseille
- In office 9 May 1953 – 7 May 1986
- Preceded by: Michel Carlini
- Succeeded by: Jean-Victor Cordonnier
- In office 30 August 1944 – 27 November 1945
- Preceded by: Pierre Barraud
- Succeeded by: Jean Cristofol

Minister of the Interior and of decentralization
- In office 22 May 1981 – 19 July 1984
- President: François Mitterrand
- Prime Minister: Pierre Mauroy; Laurent Fabius
- Preceded by: Christian Bonnet
- Succeeded by: Pierre Joxe

Minister for town and country planning
- In office 17 July 1984 – 20 march 1986
- President: François Mitterrand
- Prime Minister: Laurent Fabius
- Preceded by: Michel Rocard (indirectly)
- Succeeded by: Hervé de Charette (Planning); Pierre Méhaignerie (Infrastructure)

Minister of the Overseas
- In office 1 February 1956 – 13 June 1957
- President: René Coty
- Prime Minister: Guy Mollet
- Preceded by: Pierre-Henri Teitgen
- Succeeded by: Gérard Jaquet

Minister for the Merchant Navy
- In office 12 July 1950 – 11 August 1951
- President: Vincent Auriol
- Prime Minister: Henri Queuille; René Pleven
- Preceded by: Lionel de Tinguy du Pouët
- Succeeded by: André Morice

Member of the National Assembly
- In office 2 April 1986 – 7 April 1986
- Succeeded by: Jean-Jacques Léonetti
- Parliamentary group: SOC
- Constituency: Bouches-du-Rhône
- In office 6 December 1962 – 25 July 1981
- Preceded by: Charles Colonna d'Anfriani
- Succeeded by: Philippe Sanmarco
- Parliamentary group: SOC
- Constituency: Bouches-du-Rhône's 3rd
- In office 8 November 1945 – 5 December 1958
- Parliamentary group: SOC
- Constituency: Bouches-du-Rhône's 1st

President of the Socialist Group in the National Assembly
- In office 7 December 1962 – 22 May 1981
- Preceded by: Francis Leenhardt
- Succeeded by: Pierre Joxe

Member of the Senate
- In office 26 April 1959 – 6 December 1962
- Succeeded by: Roger Delagnes
- Parliamentary group: SOC

Under-secretary of State for Overseas territories
- In office 16 December 1946 – 16 January 1947

Secretary of State for Information
- In office 26 January 1946 – 24 June 1946

Personal details
- Born: 14 September 1910 Marsillargues, France
- Died: 7 May 1986 (aged 75) Marseille, France
- Party: French Section of the Workers' International (1933–1969); Socialist Party (1969–1986)
- Spouses: Andrée Aboulker (m. 1935; div. 1945); Marie-Antoinette Swaters (m. 1946; div. 1973); Edmonde Charles-Roux (m. 1973)
- Education: Aix-Marseille University

Gaston Defferre (14 September 1910 – 7 May 1986) was a French Socialist politician. He served as mayor of Marseille for 33 years until his death in 1986. He was minister for overseas territories in Guy Mollet’s socialist government in 1956–1957. His main achievement was to establish the framework used to grant independence to France’s African territories. In 1967, he fought the last duel in French history. As the Socialist candidate for president in 1969, he received only 5 percent of the vote. He was much more successful in promoting François Mitterrand as leader of the Socialist Party (Parti Socialiste; PS) in 1971. He held a series of ministerial portfolios after the Socialist victory in 1981, especially as minister of state for the interior and decentralization.

== Biography ==
A lawyer and member of the French Section of the Workers' International (SFIO), Defferre was involved in the Brutus Network, a Resistance Socialist group, during World War II. A long-standing member of the National Assembly (1945–1958, 1962–1986) and member of the Senate (1959–1962), he also served for many years as mayor of Marseille (1944–1945, 1953–1986). He was a formidable political force in the South-East, where he owned the major centre-left newspaper Le Provençal (which he co-founded at the Liberation) and later acquired the right-wing daily Le Méridional.

Defferre served as Merchant Marine Minister (1950–1952), then Overseas Minister (1956–1957), and laid the groundwork for the end of French colonialism in sub-Saharan Africa through Loi-cadre Defferre.

In his region, he faced a strong French Communist Party (PCF) with which he was frequently in conflict. As mayor, he relied on the support of the non-Gaullist center-right in the municipal assembly. In the same way, he advocated a national alliance between the SFIO and the Christian democratic Popular Republican Movement (MRP). Before the 1965 presidential election, L'Express published an identikit of the best center-left candidate under the name of "Mister X". It corresponded with Defferre's profile (L'Express co-founder Jean-Jacques Servan-Schreiber being a well known advocate of a Third Force alliance of socialists, Christian democrats and Radicals). But, failing to create an SFIO-MRP-Radical Party federation, Defferre had to give way to François Mitterrand, whose preferred strategy for the Socialists was the formation of a left-wing coalition including the PCF. His political career was strongly supported by members of the Corsican mafia, not least the Guérini clan.

Defferre was a participant in the last duel in France that took place in 1967 when he insulted René Ribière at the French parliament and was subsequently challenged to a duel fought with swords. Defferre yelled ‘Taisez-vous, abruti!‘ (‘Shut up, stupid!’) at Ribière following an argument in the French National Assembly. Ribière demanded an apology, Defferre refused, so Ribière demanded satisfaction by duel. René Ribière lost the duel, having been wounded twice. He escaped relatively uninjured, however.

In 1969 Defferre was the Socialist candidate once again for the French presidency. This time he had the support of ex-Premier Pierre Mendès-France, who would have been Premier again had Defferre been elected. But he was soundly defeated, suffering from the polarisation of French politics following the events of May 1968, scoring only 5% of the vote, the lowest ever score for a French Socialist candidate. The failure of Defferre prompted the birth of the new Socialist Party (PS) and buried the idea of an alliance with the centre-right.

Having been the main opponent of Guy Mollet in the party, and leader of the Socialist group in the National Assembly, Defferre helped Mitterrand take the leadership during the Epinay Congress (1971), in spite of his reservations concerning Mitterrand's strategy of an alliance with the Communists. Later, when Mitterrand became president, Defferre served as Mitterrand's interior minister from 1981 to 1984. He was the architect of the 1982 decentralization reforms. Town and Country Planning Minister until 1986, he died in office as Mayor of Marseille. His widow, Edmonde Charles-Roux, was president of the literary circle the Académie Goncourt.

== Political mandates ==
Governmental functions

- Secretary of State for Information : January–June 1946.
- Undersecretary of State for Overseas France : 1946–1947.
- Minister of Merchant Marine : 1950–1951 / March–August 1951.
- Minister of Overseas France : 1956–1957.
- Minister of State, Minister of Interior and Decentralization : 1981–1983.
- Minister of Interior and Decentralization : 1983–1984.
- Minister of State, Minister of Planning and Land Development : 1984–1986.

Electoral mandates

National Assembly of France

- Member of the National Assembly of France for Bouches-du-Rhône : 1945–1958 / 1962–1981 (Became minister in 1981) / March–May 1986 (He died in 1986). Elected in 1945, reelected in June 1946, November 1946, 1951, 1956, 1962, 1967, 1968, 1973, 1978, 1981, 1986.

Senate of France

- Senator of Bouches-du-Rhône : 1959–1962 (Reelected member of the National Assembly of France in 1962). Elected in 1959.

Municipal Council

- Mayor of Marseille : 1944–1945 / 1953–1986 (He died in 1986). Reelected in 1953, 1959, 1965, 1971, 1977, 1983.
- Municipal councillor of Marseille : 1944–1945 / 1953–1986 (He died in 1986). Reelected in 1953, 1959, 1965, 1971, 1977, 1983.
