= Paul Coste-Floret =

French politician (1911–1979)

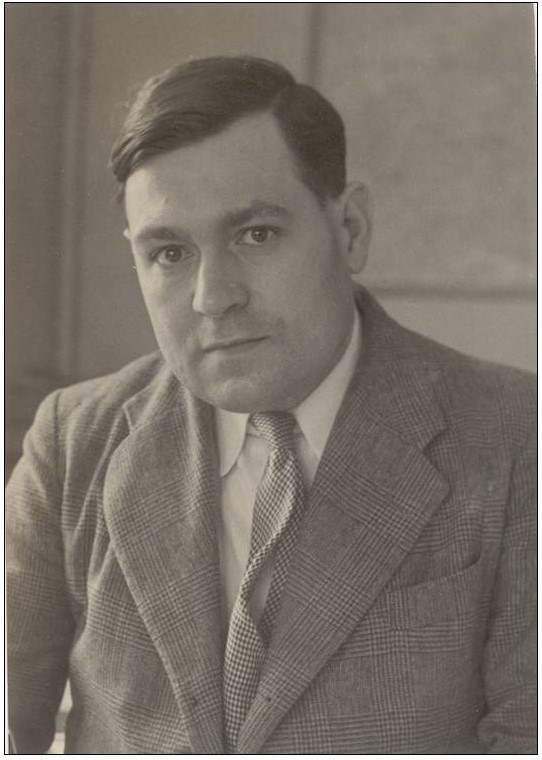

Member of the Conseil constitutionnel
- In office 3 March 1971 – 27 August 1979
- Preceded by: René Cassin
- Succeeded by: Robert Lecourt

Ministre d'État
- In office 8 January 1953 – 21 May 1953

Député for Hérault
- In office 9 December 1945 – 2 April 1967
- Succeeded by: Gilbert Sénès

Personal details
- Born: 9 April 1911 Montpellier, France
- Died: 27 August 1979 (aged 68) Montpellier, France
- Party: Mouvement Républicain Populaire
- Other political affiliations: Centre Démocrate

Paul Coste-Floret (9 April 1911 – 27 August 1979) was a French politician. He was born and died in Montpellier, France.

== Career ==
Coste-Floret was originally an academic, becoming Doctor of Law in 1935 and teaching law at the University of Algiers.

During the Second World War, Coste-Floret was active in the French Resistance. He also advised André Philip and François de Menthon, ministers in the Free French provisional government. After the war Coste-Floret was an assistant prosecutor at the Nuremberg trials.

He was elected as a député to the Assemblée Nationale in 1946 as a member of the Mouvement Républicain Populaire, for the department of Hérault, and served until 1958.

Coste-Floret supported the political return of General de Gaulle and was a member of the Constitutional Consultative Committee which prepared the Constitution of 1958. He was re-elected député of the MRP in 1958, and served with the centrist group until 1967. He was nominated by the president of the Senate, Alain Poher, to the Conseil constitutionnel from 23 February 1971, and served on this until his death.

== Political views ==
As minister of the French Overseas Territories, Coste-Floret worked on the Halong Bay Agreements (Accords de la baie d’Along) in 1949. He modified the law of Cochinchina, which became part of Vietnam. He proposed increased family benefits. As a député he defended the wine producers of Midi. In principle he supported the statute of Algeria in 1957, but still said that he would vote against it. He recommended greater autonomy for French Black Africa.

From 1967 to 1971 he was vice-president of Centre Démocrate.

== Other posts ==
Coste-Floret was mayor of Lamalou-les-Bains from 1953 to 1959 and mayor of Lodève from 1959 to 1967. He was president of the departmental council of Saint-Gervais-sur-Mare from 1967 to 1973. He was chair of the University of Montpellier from 1977 to 1979.

== Personal life ==
He was the twin brother of the politician Alfred Coste-Floret.

== Government roles ==
- Ministre de la Guerre in the government of Paul Ramadier (22 January – 22 October 1947)
- Ministre de la France d'Outre-mer in the government of Henri Queuille (1) (24 November 1947 – 29 October 1949
- Ministre de la France d'Outre-mer in the government of André Marie (26 July – 5 September 1948)
- Ministre de la France d'Outre-mer in the government of Robert Schuman (2) (5 September – 11 September 1948)
- Ministre de la France d'Outre-mer in the government of Henri Queuille (1) (11 September 1948 – 28 October 1949)
- Ministre de la France d'Outre-mer in the government of Henri Queuille (2) (2 July – 12 July 1950)
- Ministre de l'Information in the government of Edgar Faure (1) (20 January – 8 March 1952)
- Ministre d'État in the government of René Mayer (8 January – 28 June 1953)
- Ministre de la Santé publique et de la Population in the government of Joseph Laniel (28 June 1953 – 19 June 1954)
