= George Freville =

16th-century English politician

George Freville (died 1579), was an English judge and MP.

== Biography ==
Freville was of a family settled at Little Shelford, Cambridgeshire, from the reign of Edward II, was the second son of Robert Freville and Rose Peyton. He was educated at Cambridge, and studied common law at Barnard's Inn, and afterwards became a member of the Middle Temple, where he was reader in 1558, performing his duties by Edmund Plowden, his deputy, and again in Lent 1559. On the death of his elder brother John without issue in 1552, he succeeded to the family estates.

On St. Matthias day 1552, he was elected recorder of Cambridge, and admitted to office on 25 March 1553. He was in the special commission of oyer and terminer issued for Cambridgeshire on 8 August 1553, when indictments for high treason were found against the Duke of Northumberland and other adherents of Lady Jane Grey. By patent, on 31 January 1559, though not yet a serjeant, he was created third baron of the exchequer. He obtained the royal permission to retain his office of recorder of Cambridge, but the town refused to submit to this. On 28 April 1564 he became second baron, and in May 1579 he died, and was succeeded by Robert Shute 1 June. He was a Member of the Parliament of England for Preston in 1547.
