= Christian Pineau =

French Resistance fighter

- Pineau in 1957

Minister of Foreign Affairs
- In office 1 February 1956 – 14 May 1958
- Prime Minister: René Coty
- Preceded by: Antoine Pinay
- Succeeded by: René Pleven

Personal details
- Born: 14 October 1904 Chaumont-en-Bassigny, Haute-Marne, France
- Died: 5 April 1995 (aged 90) Paris, Île-de-France, France
- Relations: Jean Giraudoux (stepfather)

Christian Pineau (French pronunciation: [kʁistjɑ̃ pino]; 14 October 1904 – 5 April 1995) was a noted French Resistance fighter, who later served an important term as Minister of Foreign Affairs from 1956 through 1958.

== Life and career ==
Pineau was born in 1904 in Chaumont-en-Bassigny, Haute-Marne, France. His father was a colonel in the French Army died when he was a young child. His mother married again to the French playwright Jean Giraudoux. Later, Christian Pineau would say that it was Giraudoux who gave him his love of writing. He was educated at the École alsacienne in Paris and graduated with degrees in law and in political science. In 1931 he joined the staff of the Bank of France, and later worked for the Banque de Paris et des Pays-Bas. In 1937 he founded the journal Banque et Bourse.

A World War II French Resistance leader who established a network called Phalanx, Pineau helped found the underground newspaper Libération. He was a close ally of Charles de Gaulle and went on dangerous secret missions passing communications between occupied France and the Free France headquarters in London. He was arrested by the Gestapo in September 1942 but escaped. He was arrested again in 1943 and evaded a death sentence through forged identity papers which hid his true identity. He was sent to the Buchenwald concentration camp, and remained there until it was liberated by American soldiers in 1945.

Pineau represented the Sarthe department as a Socialist in the French National Assembly from 1946 to 1958. After the war, he served as a minister in French governments, 1945–1958. He was minister of supply in Charles de Gaulle's government (1945) and minister of public works (1947–1950) in various governments.

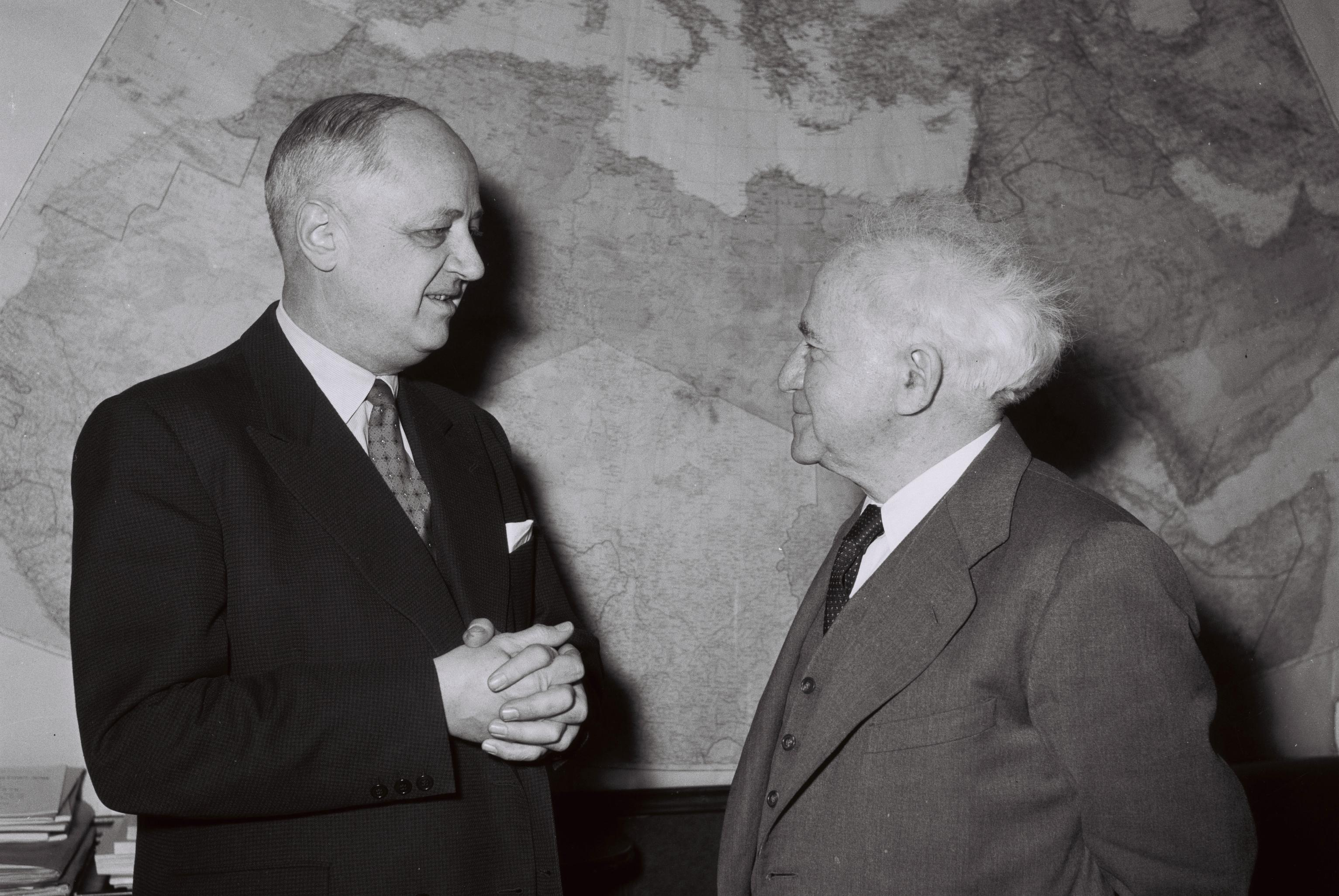
Christian Pineau meeting with David Ben-Gurion in Israel, January 1959

Pineau was finance minister for a short time in 1948. He was designated as prime minister of France by President René Coty after the February 1955 resignation of Pierre Mendès-France, but the National Assembly refused to ratify his cabinet by 312 votes against 268; his prime ministership lasted for two days between 17 and 19 February 1955.

As foreign minister (February 1956 – May 1958), Pineau was responsible for handling the Suez Crisis and for signing the Treaty of Rome on behalf of France. With Guy Mollet, he visited Moscow. In October 1956, he signed the Protocol of Sèvres with Great Britain and Israel on behalf of France.

Pineau was a lifelong advocate of European integration.

Pineau is buried in the Père Lachaise Cemetery, Paris.

== Bibliography ==
Pineau wrote several political books and memoirs:

- La simple vérité, regard sur la période 1940–1945 (the simple truth, a view of the period 1940–45), Editions Julliard
- Khrouchtchev (Khrushchev) Perrin, 1964
- Suez, Robert Laffont, 1976
- Mon cher député, Julliard, 1959
- Le grand pari, l'aventure du Traité de Rome (with Christiane Rimbaud)

He also wrote children's books:

- Plume et le saumon (Feather and the salmon)
- L'ourse aux pattons verts (The she-bear with green paws)
- Histoire de la forêt de Bercé (Story of the Bercé forest)
- La planète aux enfants perdus (The planet of lost children)

Political offices
Preceded by Paul Ramadier	Minister of Supply; 1945	Succeeded by François Tanguy-Prigent
Preceded by Jules Moch	Minister of Public Works and Transport; 1947–1948	Succeeded by Henri Queuille
Preceded by Paul Reynaud	Minister of Finance and Economic Affairs; 1948	Succeeded by Henri Queuille
Preceded by Henri Queuille	Minister of Public Works, Transport, and Tourism; 1948–1950	Succeeded by Jacques Chastellain
Preceded by Antoine Pinay	Minister of Foreign Affairs; 1956–1958	Succeeded by René Pleven
