= Bureau d'études des postes et télécommunications d'outre-mer =

The Bureau d'études des postes et télécommunications d'outre-mer (BEPTOM, Office of Oversea Posts and Telecommunications Studies in English) was a French public institution, financially autonomous. Linked to the French Minister of Cooperation, its goal was to help in the postal and telecommunication areas the French Overseas territories and the newly independent states that asked for it. It operated from 1956 until late 1994.

In philately, the office was notable as the postage stamp agency and printer of the late French colonies. It sold these issues to collectors through an agency in Paris. Its impact on telecommunications was limited by the competition from French private companies in Francophone Africa.

== History ==
From 1956, French Overseas posts and telecommunications were reorganized and decentralized following the independence of the protectorates of Morocco and Tunisia, and in anticipation of the independence of other overseas territories.

During this process, the Bureau d'études des postes et télécommunications d'outre-mer was created. It had to power to respond to requests for assistance from overseas territories and independent states by providing four internal services.

- The postage stamp service prepared philatelic products.
- The operations and juridical affairs service helped to organize postal and telecommunication networks in these countries, by drafting and editing regulations and laws.
- The technical purchase service enabled central purchasing of equipment on behalf of authorities in different countries from French firms.
- The technical cooperation service trained managers at CIPEC-PT, a post and telecommunication school in Toulouse. The CIPEC-PT declined after the opening of specialized training schools in Africa.

In 1991, the Auditor General reported to the Minister of Industry on the future of the post and telecommunication cooperation. Then, following discussions with public and private stakeholders in both France and Africa, the Bureau was abolished on 1 January 1995 following a decree signed by Prime Minister Édouard Balladur on 22 December 1995.

== Actions in the postal sector ==
BEPTOM helped to install, maintain and regulate postal networks including the creation of postage stamps if territories and countries asked for it. BEPTOM provided the necessary expertise in the form of French stamp designers and engravers and the French Post's printing plant, the Imprimerie des timbres-poste et des valeurs fiduciaires.

In 1894 the Minister of Colonies began selling stamps to collectors through the Agence des timbres-poste d'outre-mer (ATPOM, Overseas Postage Stamp Agency), located first on the avenue de la Bourdonnais, then at the Pavillon de Flore in the Louvre Palace, and after at different addresses: 10 rue du Mont-Thabor, rue Vaneau and 80 rue du Faubourg-Saint-Denis. African post offices used this sales outlet to make their stamps available at low cost.

At the beginning of the 1990s, the oversea territories and African countries' post offices were inform of the project to close the BEPTOM. La Poste postage stamp agency, the Postage Stamp and Philately National Service, proposed its printing service to the Overseas collectivities, its subsidiaries in Mayotte and Saint-Pierre-et-Miquelon and the independent public postal operators in New Caledonia, French Polynesia and Wallis-et-Futuna.

In Africa, BEPTOM helped post offices took two ways on the market of postage stamp creation: either they hired printers to print their philatelic program, or they gave an agency the contract of creating, printing and selling this program. Depending on the countries' financial possibilities and need in postage stamps for their interior market, some kept a controlled policy of stamp issues like Mali that hired reputed printers like Courvoisier and the Tunisian post. Others lost control of their issuing policy like Burkina Faso: agencies proposed on the philatelic market many stamps without any thematic links to the country. From the creation of the WADP Numbering System (WNS) and the discovery of illegal stamps, never ordered by the countries they bore the name, former BEPTOM helped countries in Francophone Africa had retook charge of their philatelic programs.

== Actions in the telecommunication sector ==
By its actions financed partly with public subventions and unbilled to the helped countries, the BEPTOM competeted with the Société française d'études de télécommunications and France Câbles et Radio, even if the latter controlled the international communication market of around fifteen countries without financing and maintaining the interior network. Progressively, to respect competitors, the BEPTOM limited itself to urgency interventions and to help privatized France Télécom take step in these markets.

After the BEPTOM disappeared, French associations, such as CSDPTT, continued the cooperative actions in Africa.

== References and sources ==
Notes

Sources

- Jean-Louis Fullsack et Bruno Jaffré, « Pour la refondation de la coopération publique bilatérale française dans le domaine des télécommunications », article from an intervention during « Technologies de l'information et de la communication et Développement » seminar organized by the Centre d'observation des économies africaines (COBEA, Université Paris-11), May 2003. The article detailed the history of French cooperation in postal and telecommunication areas, until the 2000s.
- Michel Melot, « L'Afrique francophone, le nouvel eldorado des collectionneurs ? », Timbres magazine #76, February 2007, pages 38–43. Article on the philatelic policies of some Francophone African countries after the BEPTOM disappeared.
