= Institut Maurice Thorez =

French communist research institution

Institut Maurice Thorez Maurice Thorez Institute
- Established: mid-1960s
- Research type: Political research institute
- Director: Georges Cogniot (founding), Jean Burles (as of 1978)

Institut Maurice Thorez ("Maurice Thorez Institute") was a French research institution linked to the French Communist Party. The Institute was set up in the mid-1960s (alongside the Marxist Studies and Research Centre), as part of a process of ideological reorientation of the Communist Party. These two new institutes encouraged more creative forms of applications of Marxism to theoretical and political problems. At the Institut Maurice Thorez communist historians were able to research without strict party control. The Institute published Cahiers de l'Institut Maurice Thorez.

Georges Cogniot was the founding director of the Institute, a position he held for various years. As of 1978, Jean Burles served as director of the Institute.

In 1980 the Institute was merged with the Marxist Studies and Research Centre, forming the Marxist Research Institute.
