= Paul Ramadier =

Prime Minister of France (1888–1961)

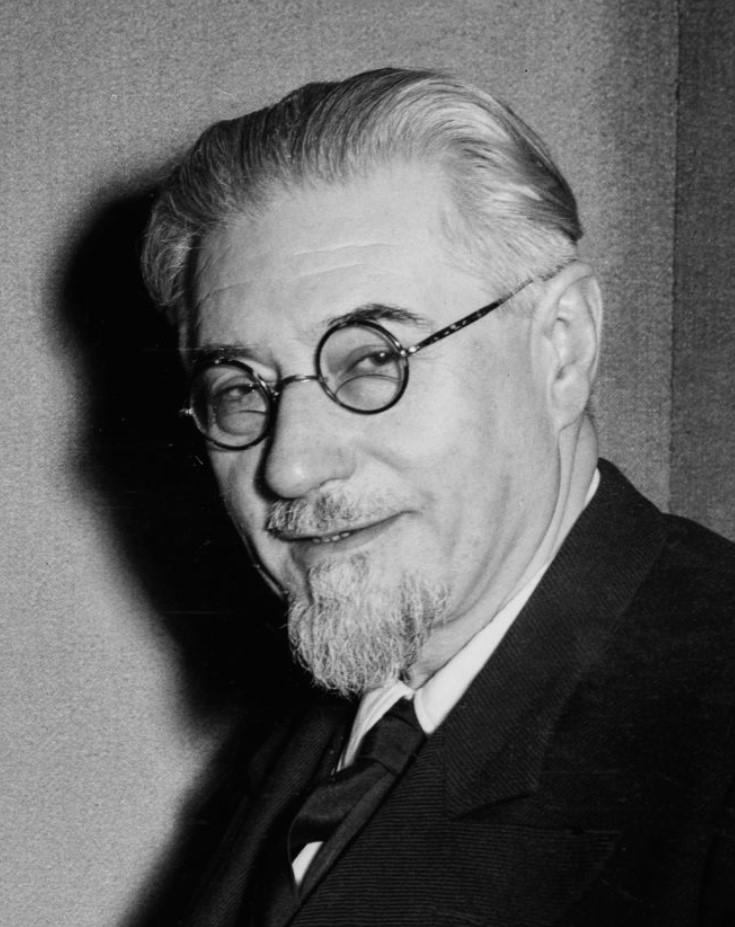
- Ramadier in 1947

Prime Minister of France
- In office 22 January 1947 – 24 November 1947
- President: Vincent Auriol
- Preceded by: Léon Blum
- Succeeded by: Robert Schuman

Personal details
- Born: 17 March 1888 La Rochelle, France
- Died: 14 October 1961 (aged 73) Rodez, France
- Party: SFIO

Paul Ramadier (17 March 1888 – 14 October 1961) was a French statesman who served as Prime Minister of France in 1947.

== Biography ==
The son of a psychiatrist, Ramadier graduated in law from the University of Toulouse and started his profession as a lawyer in Paris. Then, in 1911, he gained his doctorate in Roman law. He became the mayor of Decazeville in 1919 and served as the first Prime Minister of the Fourth Republic in 1947.

On 10 July 1940, he voted against the granting of the full powers to Marshal Philippe Pétain, who installed the Vichy regime the next day.

Ramadier took part in the Resistance and used the nom de guerre Violette. His name was included in the Yad Vashem Jewish memorial after the war.

In the government of Charles de Gaulle (1944–1945), he was Minister for Provisions and earned a reputation as a hardworking, pragmatic and conciliatory politician.

It was during his first ministry that the French Communist Party was forced out of the government in May 1947, which ended the coalition of "tripartisme" with the French Section of the Workers' International (SFIO). Ramadier voted for the Marshall Plan.

From 1956 to 1957, Ramadier was Minister of Finance under Guy Mollet.

== Governments ==
=== First Ministry (22 January – 22 October 1947) ===
- Paul Ramadier – President of the Council
- Maurice Thorez – Vice President of the Council
- Georges Bidault – Minister of Foreign Affairs
- Paul Coste-Floret – Minister of War
- Louis Jacquinot – Minister of Marine
- André Maroselli – Minister of Air
- Édouard Depreux – Minister of the Interior
- Robert Schuman – Minister of Finance
- André Philip – Minister of National Economy
- Robert Lacoste – Minister of Industrial Production
- Ambroise Croizat – Minister of Labour and Social Security
- André Marie – Minister of Justice
- Marcel Edmond Naegelen – Minister of National Education
- François Mitterrand – Minister of Veterans and War Victims
- François Tanguy-Prigent – Minister of Agriculture
- Pierre Bourdan – Minister of Youth, Arts, and Letters
- Marius Moutet – Minister of Overseas France
- Jules Moch – Minister of Public Works and Transport
- Georges Marrane – Minister of Public Health and Population
- Charles Tillon – Minister of Reconstruction and Town Planning.
- Jean Letourneau – Minister of Commerce
- Félix Gouin – Minister of Planning
- Marcel Roclore – Minister of State
- Yvon Delbos – Minister of State

Changes:

- 4 May 1947 – Pierre-Henri Teitgen succeeds Thorez as Vice President of the Council. The other Communist ministers (Croizat, Marranne, and Tillon) also resign.
- 9 May 1947 – Daniel Mayer succeeds Croizat as Minister of Labour and Social Security. Robert Prigent succeeds Marranne as Minister of Public Health and Population. Jean Letourneau succeeds Tillon as Minister of Reconstruction and Town Planning. Eugène Thomas enters the Cabinet as Minister of Posts.
- 11 August 1947 – Robert Lacoste succeeds Letourneau as Minister of Commerce, becoming thus Minister of Commerce and Industry.

=== Second Ministry (22 October – 24 November 1947) ===
- Paul Ramadier – President of the Council
- Georges Bidault – Minister of Foreign Affairs
- Pierre-Henri Teitgen – Minister of National Defense
- Édouard Depreux – Minister of the Interior
- Robert Schuman – Minister of Finance
- Jules Moch – Minister of Economic Affairs, Planning, Public Works, Transport, Reconstruction, and Town Planning
- Robert Lacoste – Minister of Industry
- André Marie – Minister of Justice
- Marcel Edmond Naegelen – Minister of National Education
- Daniel Mayer – Minister of Social Affairs, Veterans, and War Victims
- Marcel Roclore – Minister of Agriculture
- Paul Coste-Floret – Minister of Overseas France
- Yvon Delbos – Minister of State

Political offices
Preceded by Pierre-Henri Teitgen	Minister of Justice; 1946–1947	Succeeded by André Marie
Preceded by Léon Blum	Prime Minister of France; 1947	Succeeded by Robert Schuman
