= Marc Rucart =

French journalist and Radical politician

Marc Émile Rucart
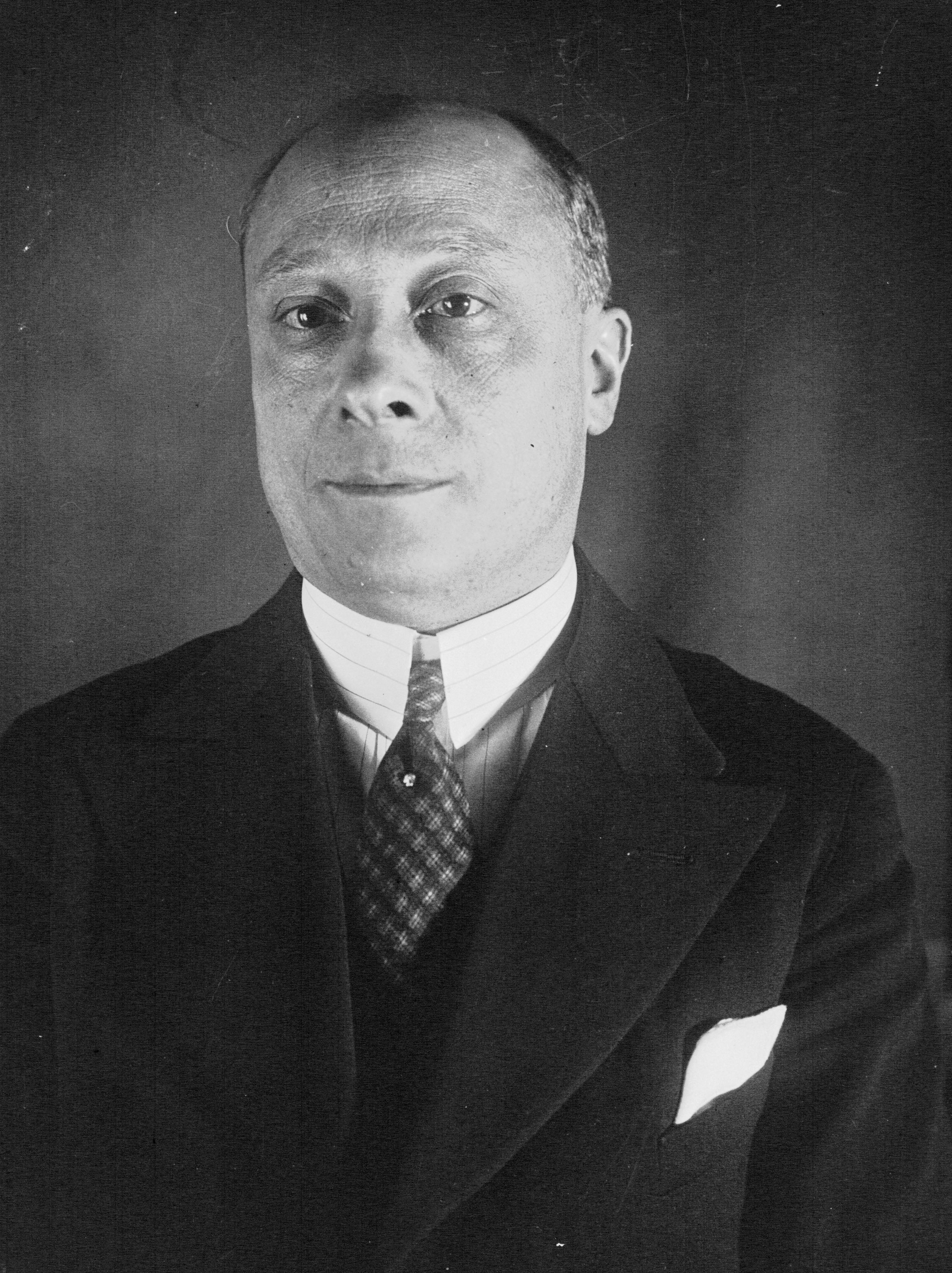
- Rucart in 1933

Minister of Justice
- In office 4 June 1936 – 21 June 1937
- Prime Minister: Léon Blum
- Preceded by: Léon Bérard
- Succeeded by: Vincent Auriol

Minister of Health
- In office 22 June 1937 – 10 March 1938
- Prime Minister: Camille Chautemps
- Preceded by: Henri Sellier
- Succeeded by: Fernand Gentin

Minister of Justice
- In office 13 March 1938 – 8 April 1938
- Prime Minister: Léon Blum
- Preceded by: César Campinchi
- Succeeded by: Paul Reynaud

Minister of Health
- In office 10 April 1938 – 20 March 1940
- Prime Minister: Édouard Daladier
- Preceded by: Fernand Gentin
- Succeeded by: Marcel Héraud

Personal details
- Born: 24 July 1893 Coulommiers, Seine-et-Marne, France
- Died: 23 January 1964 (aged 70) Paris, France
- Occupation: Journalist

Marc Émile Rucart (24 July 1893 – 23 January 1964) was a French journalist and Radical politician who was a deputy from 1928 to 1942. He alternated between the posts of Minister of Justice and Minister of Health from 1936 to 1940. Although he was not pro-feminist he introduced changes that gave greater opportunity to women. He was anti-racist, and after the initial defeat of France in World War II he did not support the Vichy government, but participated in the National Council of the Resistance and then in the first Provisional Consultative Assembly . After the war he was a senator from 1947 to 1958.

== Early years (1893–1928) ==
Marc Émile Rucart was born on 24 July 1893 in Coulommiers, Seine-et-Marne. Rucart made his first journalistic efforts when he was aged 17. In 1914 he edited the Loiret Progrès. He moved to Paris where he contributed to the Le Radical, La Lanterne and Progrès civique. After returning to the province he became director of Paul Doumer's La Tribune, and then editor of the Vosges République.

== Inter-war politics (1928–37) ==
In 1928 Rucart ran for election as deputy in the Épinal constituency as candidate of the Radical Socialist party, and was elected in the first round. He was elected as deputy in the first round in 1932 and 1936. As deputy he was particularly interested in defense issues. He was also rapporteur of the inquiry into the Oustric Affair and general rapporteur of the inquiry into the 6 February 1934 crisis. He edited the report on the official investigation into the 6 February 1934 events, published by the Chamber on 17 May 1939. He helped defend the rights of Vietnamese who believed in Caodaism.

Rucart appointed was Minister of Justice from 4 June 1936 to 21 June 1937 in the 1st cabinet of Léon Blum. Rucart helped accelerate the process of naturalizing immigrants from Eastern Europe and Germany. Rucart worked with Roger Salengro, Minister of the Interior, and Jean Lebas, Minister of Labor, to help refugees from Nazi Germany who had found their way into France. By decree of 17 September 1936 they were given identity certificates and protected from arbitrary expulsion from the country. In the fall of 1936, a report from Rucart's office drew attention to the delays in the process of granting citizenship and the resultant huge backlog. Rucart said this was "intolerable" given the low birthrate in France and the increasing vulnerability to attack. He obtained funding for additional staff to process the applications.

Rucart said in the spring of 1937 "I have wanted naturalization policy to take into account, above all else, the needs of national defense. I believe it is now time to facilitate the accession to French nationality of all able-bodied and perfectly honest adults under the age of 30 who have been suitable for military service." He reduced the role of the Confédération des Syndicats Médicaux in approving applications by doctors. He wrote in a circular to prefects that they should remind the professional associations that they should only be concerned with reviewing professional qualifications. The medical profession strongly resisted his efforts to streamline to process.

== Minister of Health (1937–40) ==
Rucart replaced the popular and energetic Henri Sellier as Minister of Health when the Blum cabinet resigned in June 1937. The change may in part have been to reduce the number of socialists in the government, but may also have been a reaction to Sellier's efforts to suppress regulated prostitution. Rucart was Minister of Health from 22 June 1937 to 10 March 1938 in the 3rd and 4th cabinets of Camille Chautemps, then briefly Minister of Justice from 13 March 1938 to 8 April 1938 in Léon Blum's second cabinet. He was again Minister of Health from 10 April 1938 to 20 March 1940 in the 3rd cabinet of Édouard Daladier.

As Minister of Health Rucart instituted various reforms including regulations for the nursing profession, the general inspectorate for public health and the National Red Cross Council. He created national bonuses for births. In February 1938 Rucart stated that the Chautemps government favored greater efforts to encourage births, but its view was that creating prosperity was the best way to increase the birthrate. He said, "Our peoples are too advanced to agree happily to bring children into the world whose lives may be threatened by unemployment, poverty, sickness or war. The pro-natalist lobby objected to this position, since they felt the parents of large families should be favored over those who had none.

In October 1937 Rucart created the Higher Council for the Protection of Children, with the mandate of coordinating public and private services, the different government agencies and the League of Nations commissions. With the imminent defeat of the Republican side in the Spanish Civil War (1936–39), refugees began to flood into France in January 1939. They received a charitable welcome. Rucart toured the border with Albert Sarraut, the Minister of Interior. They commented on "how the local authorities had met the challenge, and how they had coped with unprecedented difficulties."

Rucart removed obstacles to women progressing from deputy inspectors to full inspecteurs in public assistance services. He said the performance of women as deputy inspectors had shown "the competence and authority required of a chef de service, this combination of qualities not depending in any way on the sex of the individual, but on moral and professional worth." He noted that women had "qualities of generosity and thoughtfulness which suit her particularly to work with children and especially unfortunate children." He dismissed the objection that women did not have the physical stamina for the job, since the automobile had removed that need, and dismissed the issue of the legal inferiority of women to men when acting as guardians designated by the prefect of a department on the basis that the guardianship was assigned to the inspecteur, not to the man or woman who held the post.

Rucart was not committed to the feminist cause. The law of 9 April 1938 that allowed women to become inspecteurs imposed a ceiling of 50% of chief departmental inspectors. He was angered by the street demonstrations organized by Louise Weiss in the 1930s, and told her much later "The right to vote does away with the right of insurrection, Madame ... Had you not read Victor Hugo?" He was nonplussed when Weiss reminded him that at the time women in France did not have the right to vote. Rucart was known for being anti-racist. The Daladier cabinet did not introduce any laws that discriminated against Jews, but issued a decree banning incitement of religious or racial hatred. Marshal Philippe Pétain's government annulled the decree soon after taking power in Vichy.

== World War II (1939–45) ==
Rucart abstained from the vote to give Pétain full powers on 10 July 1940. He created a first cell of the French Resistance in Paris. In January 1941 he was arrested and imprisoned in Cherche-Midi and then in Fresnes. He was released for lack of evidence, and formed the Patriam Recuperare group. After being denounced he moved to the southern zone and helped organize the Resistance in Toulouse. In May 1943 he returned to Paris to represent the Radical Socialist party in the National Council of the Resistance. Rucart made his way to London and then to Algiers, where in November 1943 he became a member of the provisional Consultative Assembly.

Rucart was among the traditionalists who felt that it was imperative to maintain the rights of parliament, but this group did not have the weight to override the Gaullists, who did not want to impose and handicaps on General Charles de Gaulle as leader of Free France. The Consultative Assembly, as its name implied, did not have much power but could debate government proposals and often caused improvements to the wording. Rucart was outspoken, but would not undermine de Gaulle. Rucart chaired the Foreign Affairs Committee of the Consultative Assembly. In this capacity he attended the Colonial Conference on Brazzaville in January 1944. He was then president of the Radical Socialist party until the Liberation of France. When the Consultative Assembly first sat in Paris in November 1944, Rucart was founder and president of the group of the Democratic Radicals and Radical Socialists.

== Later career (1945–64) ==
Marc Rucart had significant stakes in several French trading companies in French West Africa in the late 1940s. The governor-general made every effort to meet his needs. Rucart was elected Councilor of the Republic for Ivory Coast in the first round of votes on 13 January 1947 on the list of the Rally of Left Republicans. He became president of the committee on Overseas France. He was elected to the Senate for the newly formed constituency of French Upper Volta on 14 November 1948. He was reelected on 18 May 1952. He voted for the constitutional amendment on 2–3 June 1958 that was the basis for the French Fifth Republic. He failed to be reelected on 8 June 1958.

Rucart became a high-grade Freemason. He was president of the professional union of editors in chief, and an honorary member of the central committee of the Human Rights League. He was a knight of the Legion of Honour.

Marc Rucart died on 23 January 1964 in Paris.

== Publications ==
- Rucart, Marc (1916). Protégeons, défendons les ouvrières à domicile. imp. du Progrès. p. 30.
- Rucart, Marc (1927). L'Organisation de la démocratie. Impr. Lorraine. p. 59.
- Rucart, Marc, ed. (1934). Rapport général fait au nom de la Commission d'enquête chargée de rechercher les causes et les origines des évenements du 6 février 1934 et jours suivants ainsi que toutes les responsabilités encourues (in French). Paris: Impr. de la Chambre des députés.
- Rucart, Marc (1939). "Preface". In Viborel, Lucien (ed.). Savoir prévenir: guide pratique de la santé et de la lutte contre les maladies sociales (in French). Paris: L. Viborel. p. 319.
- Rucart, Marc (1939). preface. Ma doctoresse, guide pratique d'hygiène et de médecine de la femme moderne. By Houdré, Marie (in French). Loisel, Ernest, introduction. Strasbourg: Impr. des "Dernières nouvelles".
- Rucart, Marc (1950). preface. Sursauts de l'Asie. Remous du Mékong. By Gentil, Pierre (in French). Paris: Charles-Lavauzelle (impr. de Charles-Lavauzelle). p. 368.

== Sources ==
- Bullitt, William C. (14 August 1944). "The Future of France". LIFE. Time Inc. ISSN 0024-3019.
- Caron, Vicki (1999). Uneasy Asylum: France and the Jewish Refugee Crisis, 1933-1942. Stanford University Press. ISBN 978-0-8047-4377-8.
- Clark, Linda L. (21 December 2000). The Rise of Professional Women in France: Gender and Public Administration since 1830. Cambridge University Press. ISBN 978-1-139-42686-2.
- collectif (2005). Dictionnaire des parlementaires français de 1940 à 1958 (in French). Paris: La Documentation française.
- Gemie, Sharif; Humbert, Laure; Reid, Fiona (19 January 2012). Outcast Europe: Refugees and Relief Workers in an Era of Total War 1936-48. A&C Black. ISBN 978-1-4411-0244-7.
- Gobron, Gabriel (2008). History and Philosophy of Caodaism. Wildside Press LLC. ISBN 978-1-4344-6284-8.
- Jolly, Jean (1960–1977). "Rucart (Marc Émile)". Dictionnaire des parlementaires français; notices biographiques sur les ministres, députés et sénateurs français de 1889 à 1940 (in French). Paris: Presses universitaires de France. ISBN 2-1100-1998-0.
- Kedward, Rod (29 June 2006). La Vie en bleu: France and the French since 1900. Penguin Books Limited. ISBN 978-0-14-190680-5.
- Langlois, Walter G. (2000). "Politics and the "Farfelu"". In Geoffrey T. Harris (ed.). Andre Malraux. Rodopi. ISBN 90-420-1011-8.
- "Marc, Emile RUCART" (in French). Assemblée nationale.
- Passmore, Kevin (1 January 2013). The Right in France from the Third Republic to Vichy. OUP Oxford. ISBN 978-0-19-965820-6.
- Pedersen, Susan (25 August 1995). Family, Dependence, and the Origins of the Welfare State: Britain and France, 1914-1945. Cambridge University Press. ISBN 978-0-521-55834-1.
- Reynolds, Sian (1 November 2002). France Between the Wars: Gender and Politics. Routledge. ISBN 978-1-134-79832-2.
- Rodney, Walter (13 June 2012). How Europe Underdeveloped Africa. Fahamu/Pambazuka. ISBN 978-1-906387-94-5.
- Scott, Joan Wallach (1 September 1997). ONLY PARADOXES TO OFFER. Harvard University Press. ISBN 978-0-674-63931-7.
- Wieviorka, Olivier (2009). Orphans of the Republic: The Nation's Legislators in Vichy France. Harvard University Press. ISBN 978-0-674-03261-3.
