= Albert Rivière =

French tailor and politician

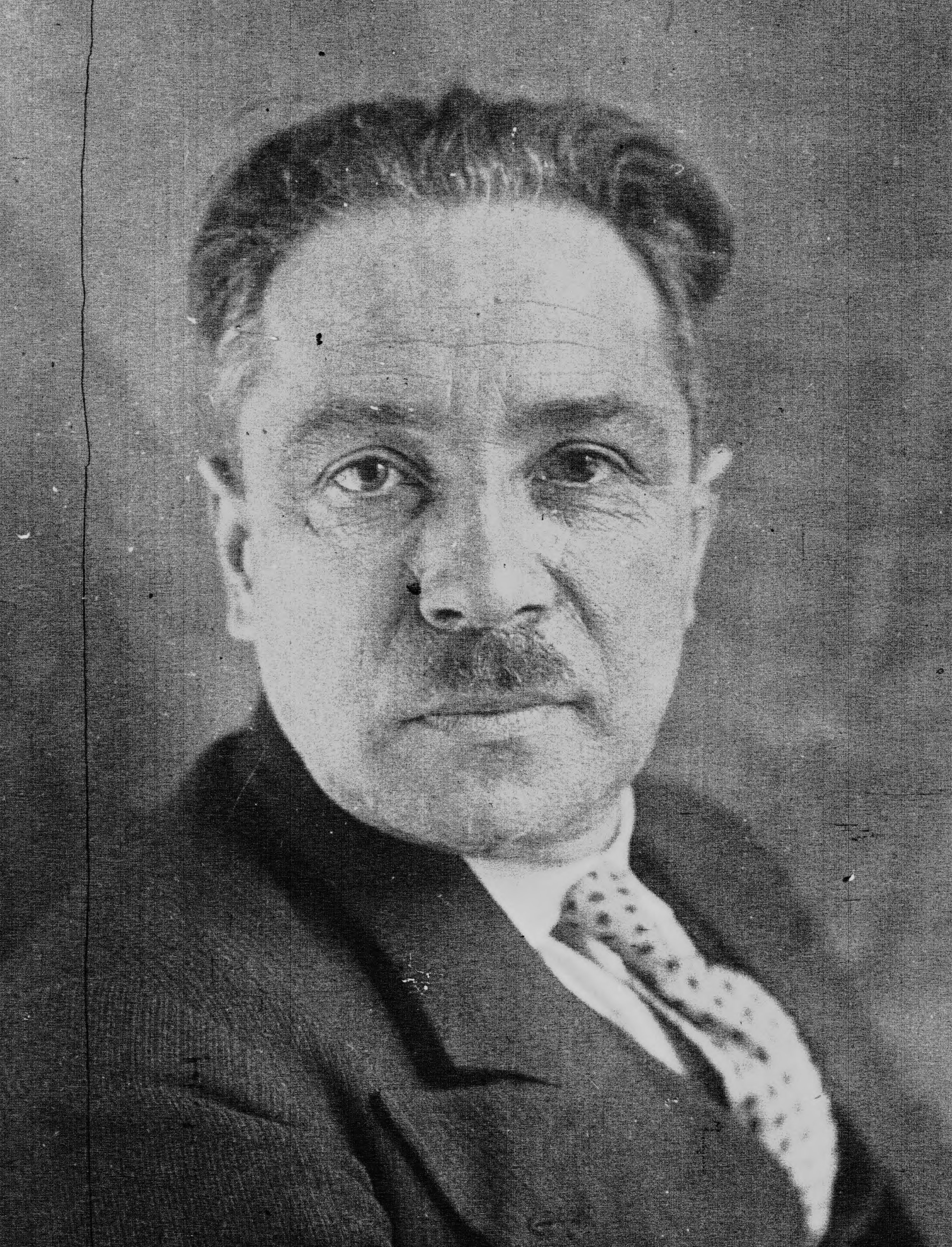
- Albert Rivière in 1932

Minister of Pensions
- In office 4 June 1936 – 18 January 1938
- Prime Minister: Léon Blum; Camille Chautemps
- Preceded by: René Besse
- Succeeded by: Robert Lassalle

Minister of Pensions
- In office 13 March 1938 – 10 April 1938
- Prime Minister: Léon Blum
- Preceded by: Robert Lassalle
- Succeeded by: Auguste Champetier de Ribes

Minister of Veteran Affairs and Pensions
- In office 21 March 1940 – 16 June 1940
- Prime Minister: Paul Reynaud
- Preceded by: René Besse
- Succeeded by: Jean Ybarnégaray

Minister of Colonies
- In office 16 June 1940 – 12 July 1940
- Prime Minister: Philippe Pétain
- Preceded by: Louis Rollin
- Succeeded by: Henry Lémery

Personal details
- Born: 24 April 1891 Le Grand-Bourg, Creuse, France
- Died: 28 June 1953 (aged 62) Boussac, Creuse, France
- Occupation: Tailor, politician

Albert Rivière (French pronunciation: [albɛʁ ʁivjɛʁ]; 24 April 1891 – 28 June 1953) was a French tailor and moderate socialist politician. He was Minister of Pensions between 1936 and 1940, and was briefly Minister of Colonies in 1940.

== Early years ==
Albert Rivière was born on 24 April 1891 in the village of Le Grand-Bourg, Creuse, son of an artisan shoemaker. His father, Léobon Rivière, was a shoemaker. His mother, François Gallous, was a seamstress. When he was born his parents already had two sons and four daughters, all of whom would later enter trades or shops. He apprenticed with a tailor, then joined the army. During World War I (1914–18) he was wounded in the face, and part of his jaw had to be replaced. He was awarded the Legion of Honor.

On 22 November 1917 Rivière married Jeanne Chadaine, daughter of a cooper. A daughter was born in 1919 and a son in 1925. Rivière became a tailor and draper in Boussac, Creuse, where his brother was a baker. He became a militant in the movement of veterans and disabled from the war, and in the Section Française de l'Internationale Ouvrière (SFIO, French Section of the Workers' International). In 1919 he turned down an offer to run as socialist candidate for the legislature. In 1922 he became the first secretary of the SFIO federation of the Creuse after Camille Bénassy. He was on the socialist list in the elections of 1924, with three other veterans, but was not elected.

== Deputy ==
Rivière ran for deputy for Boussac in the legislative elections of 1928 and was elected in the second round on 29 April 1928 by 7,086 votes out of 13,791. In the Chamber of Deputies he was a member of the committees on Commerce & Industry and on Civil & Military Pensions, and was particularly active in the latter. He was reelected on 1 May 1932 by 9,130 votes out of 14,070. He was a member of committees on the Army, Pensions, Regulation and Foreign Affairs, and was on the Commission of Inquiry into the 6 February 1934 crisis. He was active in debates on military spending, and explained the Socialist policy on national defense.

Rivière was reelected on 26 April 1936 by 7,505 votes out of 18,835, and held office until 31 May 1942. He was appointed Minister of Pensions in the Popular Front government formed on 4 June 1936, in the 2nd cabinet of Camille Chautemps (22 June 1937 – 14 June 1938) and the 2nd cabinet of Léon Blum (formed 13 March 1938). He held this post in all the cabinets apart from the 4th cabinet of Camille Chautemps (18 January – 10 March 1938) and the 3rd cabinet of Édouard Daladier (10 April 1938 – 20 March 1940).

== World War II and later ==
During World War II (1939–45), on 21 March 1940 Rivière was named minister of Veterans and Pensioners in the cabinet of Paul Reynaud. After the German invasion of France and collapse of the French defense, Marshal Philippe Pétain offered Rivière a position in his cabinet on 16 June 1940. Rivière consulted with Léon Blum before turning the offer down on the basis that he did not want to join a government that was planning to sign an armistice. After further discussions he accepted so the socialists would be represented in the cabinet. On 16 June 1940 he joined Pétain's cabinet as Minister of Colonies. On 10 July 1940, he voted in favour of granting the cabinet presided by Marchal Philippe Pétain authority to draw up a new constitution, thereby effectively ending the French Third Republic and establishing Vichy France.

Riviere was later removed from his position in the veterans' associations by the Vichy government. He assisted with the escape of André Blumel from the Evaux detention center. He hosted Robert Lazurick, a former deputy for Cher of Jewish origin, founder of the clandestine journal L'Aurore. He hid two Canadian aviators and helped them find their way back to England, for which he received the Military Cross. After the war the Supreme Court dismissed charges against him for involvement with the Vichy government. He contributed to L'Aurore for most of the remainder of his life. Albert Rivière died on 28 June 1953 in Boussac, Creuse.

== Sources ==
- Gammal, Jean; Plas, Pascal; Avizou, Guy (2001). Dictionnaire des parlementaires du Limousin sous la IIIe République: Creuse (in French). Presses Univ. Limoges. ISBN 978-2-84287-174-1.
- Graham, B. D. (2006-04-20). Choice and Democratic Order: The French Socialist Party, 1937-1950. Cambridge University Press. ISBN 978-0-521-02566-9.
- Jolly, Jean (1960–77). "Rivière, Albert". Dictionnaire des parlementaires français de 1889 à 1940 (in French). [As of October 2015 the online entry was incorrectly titled "Albert, Marcel YVON". The text appears to be an accurate transcription of the chapter in the source book by Jolly.] ISBN 2-1100-1998-0.
