= List of French ministers of veterans affairs =

The minister of veterans affairs has been a cabinet post in France since just after World War I (1914–18). The minister is responsible for former members of the armed forces, particularly disabled people and pensioners. At times the officeholder has been called Minister of Pensions (Ministre des Pensions), at times Minister of Veterans and Pensions (Ministre des Anciens combattants et pensionnés) and at times Minister for Veterans (Ministre des Anciens combattants). In recent years the ministry has been subordinate to the Ministry of Defense and the officeholder may be a secretary of state or sub-minister.

== Ministers of Pensions ==
- 20 January 1920 – 15 January 1922: André Maginot
- 14 April 1924 – 17 April 1925: Édouard Bovier-Lapierre
- 17 April 1925 – 28 November 1925: Louis Antériou
- 28 November 1925 – 19 July 1926: Paul Jourdain
- 19 July 1926 – 23 July 1926: Georges Bonnet
- 23 July 1926 – 11 November 1928: Louis Marin
- 11 November 1928 – 3 November 1929: Louis Antériou
- 3 November 1929 – 2 March 1930: Claudius Gallet
- 2 March 1930 – 13 December 1930: Auguste Champetier de Ribes
- 13 December 1930 – 22 December 1930: Robert Thoumyre
- 23 December 1930 – 27 January 1931: Maurice Dormann
- 27 January 1931 – 20 February 1932: Auguste Champetier de Ribes
- 20 February 1932 – 3 June 1932: Auguste Champetier de Ribes
- 3 June 1932 – 18 December 1932: Adrien Berthod
- 18 December 1932 – 26 October 1933: Edmond Miellet
- 26 October 1933 – 9 February 1934: Hippolyte Ducos
- 9 February 1934 – 1 June 1935: Georges Rivollet
- 1 June 1935 – 7 June 1935: Camille Perfetti
- 7 June 1935 – 24 January 1936: Henri Maupoil
- 24 January 1936 – 4 June 1936: René Besse
- 4 June 1936 – 18 January 1938: Albert Rivière
- 18 January 1938 – 13 March 1938: Robert Lassalle
- 13 March 1938 – 10 April 1938: Albert Rivière – Pensions

== Ministers of Veterans and Pensions ==
During World War II (1939–45) the office was renamed to "Veterans and the French Family" and then eliminated in the Vichy government. General Charles de Gaulle appointed commissioners for pensions and then for prisoners, deportees and refugees in his government in exile.

- 10 April 1938 – 13 September 1939: Auguste Champetier de Ribes – Anciens combattants et pensionnés
- 13 September 1939 – 21 March 1940: René Besse – Anciens combattants et pensionnés
- 21 March 1940 – 16 June 1940: Albert Rivière – Anciens combattants et pensionnés
- 16 June 1940 – 12 July 1940: Jean Ybarnégaray – Anciens combattants et de la Famille française
- 28 July 1942 – 7 June 1943: André Diethelm (commissaire) – Finances et Pensions
- 9 November 1943 – 21 November 1945: Henri Frenay (commissaire) – Prisonniers, Déportés et Réfugiés

== Ministers of Veterans and War Victims ==
In the period up to March 1974 the office holder was generally entitled "Minister of Veterans and War Victims", sometimes simply "Minister of Veterans".

- 26 January 1946 – 8 July 1946: Laurent Casanova
- 16 December 1946 – 22 January 1947: Max Lejeune
- 22 January 1947 – 22 October 1947: François Mitterrand
- 22 October 1947 – 24 November 1947: Daniel Mayer
- 24 November 1947 – 26 July 1948: François Mitterrand
- 26 July 1948 – 5 September 1948: André Maroselli
- 5 September 1948 – 11 September 1948: Jules Catoire
- 11 September 1948 – 28 October 1949: Robert Bétolaud
- 29 October 1949 – 11 August 1951: Louis Jacquinot
- 11 août 1951 – 8 January 1953: Emmanuel Temple
- 8 January 1953 – 28 June 1953: Henry Bergasse
- 28 June 1953 – 19 June 1954: André Mutter
- 19 June 1954 – 3 September 1954: Emmanuel Temple
- 3 September 1954 – 23 February 1955: Jean Masson
- 23 February 1955 – 6 October 1955: Raymond Triboulet
- 20 October 1955 – 1 February 1956: Vincent Badie
- 1 February 1956 – 13 June 1957: François Tanguy-Prigent
- 13 June 1957 – 6 November 1957: André Dulin
- 6 November 1957 – 14 May 1958: Antoine Quinson
- 14 May 1958 – 1 June 1958: Vincent Badie
- 3 June 1958 – 9 June 1958: Michel Debré – Veteran Affairs
- 9 June 1958 – 8 January 1959: Edmond Michelet
- 8 January 1959 – 28 November 1962: Raymond Triboulet
- 28 November 1962 – 8 January 1966: Jean Sainteny
- 8 January 1966 – 6 April 1967: Alexandre Sanguinetti
- 6 April 1967 – 6 July 1972: Henri Duvillard
- 6 July 1972 – 27 February 1974: André Bord

== Secretary of State of Veterans ==
In March 1974 André Bord became Secretary of State in the Minister of the Army, responsible for Veterans and War Victims

- 1 March 1974 – 26 September 1977: André Bord
- 26 September 1977 – 5 April 1978: Jean-Jacques Beucler
- 5 April 1978 – 21 May 1981: Maurice Plantier
- 21 May 1981 – 20 March 1986: Jean Laurain
- 20 March 1986 – 10 May 1988: Georges Fontès
- 10 May 1988 – 22 June 1988: Jacques Mellick
- 22 June 1988 – 15 May 1991: André Méric
- 18 May 1991 – 29 March 1993: Louis Mexandeau
- 29 March 1993 – 18 May 1995: Philippe Mestre (Minister)
- 18 May 1995 – 4 June 1997: Pierre Pasquini (Minister)
- 4 June 1997 – 3 September 2001: Jean-Pierre Masseret
- 9 September 2001 – 7 May 2002: Jacques Floch
- 7 May 2002 – 17 June 2002: Michèle Alliot-Marie
- 17 June 2002 – 15 May 2007: Hamlaoui Mekachera
- 19 June 2007 – 18 March 2008: Alain Marleix
- 18 March 2008 – 23 June 2009: Jean-Marie Bockel
- 23 June 2009 – 13 November 2010: Hubert Falco
- 14 November 2010 – 27 February 2011: Alain Juppé
- 27 February 2011 – 29 June 2011: Gérard Longuet
- 29 June 2011 – 10 May 2012: Marc Laffineur
- 16 May 2012 – 21 November 2014: Kader Arif
- 21 November 2014 - 15 May 2017: Jean-Marc Todeschini
- 15 May 2017 - 20 May 2022: Geneviève Darrieussecq
- 20 May 2022 - 4 July 2022: vacant
- 4 July 2022 - 11 January 2024: Patricia Mirallès
- 11 January 2024 - 8 February 2024: vacant
- 8 February 2024 - 21 September 2024: Patricia Mirallèsv
- 27 September 2024 - 23 December 2024: Jean-Louis Thiériot
- 23 December 2024 - 4 October 2025: Patricia Mirallès
- 5 October 2025 - 11 October 2025: Bruno Le Maire
