= Léo Lagrange =

French politician (1900–1940)

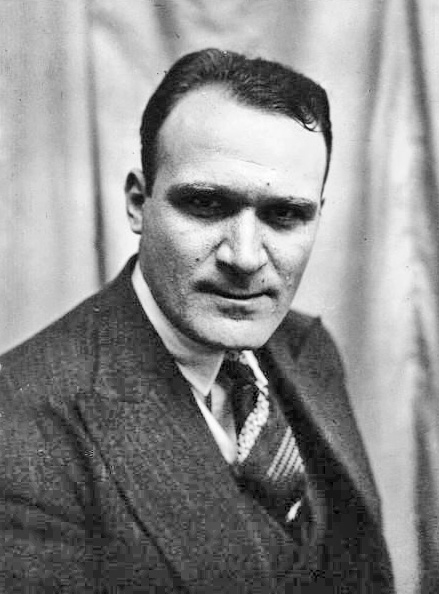
Léo Lagrange (1932)

Léo Lagrange (French pronunciation: [leo laɡʁɑ̃ʒ]; 28 November 1900, in Bourg – 9 June 1940, in Évergnicourt) was a French Socialist, member of the SFIO, named secretary of State in the Popular Front government of Léon Blum.

== Biography ==
As a child, Lagrange was registered with the Éclaireurs de France, a scouting movement which had no religious affiliation. At the end of his studies at the Lycée Henri-IV, in August 1917, Lagrange joined the army. On his return, Lagrange was registered in the Faculty of Law and at the Institute of political sciences. Shortly after the Tours Congress (December 1920), he joined the SFIO, directed by Paul Faure, Jean Longuet and Léon Blum and joined the Socialist students' organisation.

Having obtained his law degree, Lagrange registered in 1922 at the bar of Paris. Affected by the horrors of World War I, Lagrange reserved in particular his services to victims of tuberculosis, of lung diseases and of poison gas. He married Madeleine Veiller in 1925. The following year, Lagrange met André Malraux and Jean Prévost. Lagrange mixed then with the intellectual movement of the 1930s, being linked with a number of writers, historians, artists and scientists. Lagrange became a writer with the newspaper Le Populaire, the press organ of the SFIO, and held there a chronique on legal topics.

Lagrange stood in the legislative elections in 1928, in the XIe district of Paris but was defeated. At the time of the elections of May 1932, Lagrange was designated as a socialist candidate looking to win back the first district of Avesnes-sur-Helpe, in the Nord. At the public meetings, Lagrange stressed the need, for the working class, to be informed and organized if it wanted to lead one day. After the 6 February 1934 riots organised by far-right leagues, the Cartel des gauches was toppled. For the first time in the history of the Third Republic (1871-1940), threats of a right-wing coup d'état had been enough to overthrow a democratically elected government. Following this event, many people on the left believed in a fascist conspiracy to topple the Republic. Thus, they started organising in anti-fascist groups, preparing in advance the Comintern's Popular Front strategy.

Following the victory of the Popular Front at the 1936 legislative elections, Lagrange was then named under-secretary of State for Sport and given responsibility for the organisation of Leisure, under the authority of the Minister for Public Health Henri Sellier.
It was the first time that France had such a state secretary, and the Popular Front enacted the first paid holidays (2 weeks), among other social reforms.

His mandate was not addressed exclusively to youth but to all of society. Lagrange was focused nevertheless on the young because they constituted the future of society. Lagrange strongly opposed the fascist model of sport, which transformed it into a substitute for belligerent activities and instrumentalized it in a militarist manner. To the contrary, Lagrange advocated a conception of sports based on anti-militarism and on the fulfillment of individual personality:

“… It cannot be a question in a democratic country of militarizing the distractions and the pleasures of the masses and of transforming the joy skillfully distributed into a means of not thinking.”

Lagrange dedicated himself in developing sporting, tourist and cultural leisure, but opposed the professionalisation of sports, creating an elitist caste of sportsmen, and was against their development in France. Lagrange was at the origin of the creation of the popular leisure pass which grants 40% of reduction on rail-bound transports, while he encouraged and impelled the movement of youth hostels. 1936 in France was witness, under the Popular Front, to the first departures towards snow resorts with special trains and reduced fares on the cable cars; popular cruises were also later introduced.

Lagrange also played a major role in the co-organisation of the People's Olympiad in Barcelona with the Spanish Second Republic. Nazi Germany had managed to gain the right to organise the Olympic Games in Berlin, against Barcelona, but anti-fascists refused to participate in these Games and went on with their own project. The trials for these popular Olympiads proceeded on 4 July 1936 in the Pershing stadium in Paris, which had been built in June 1919. Lagrange chaired these days in person, along with Minister of Transport Pierre Cot, André Malraux, who later fought in the International Brigades, and other figures of the Popular Front. Through their club, the FSGT, or individually, 1.200 French athletes were registered with these anti-fascist Olympiads.

But Blum finally decided not to vote for the funds to pay the athletes' expenses. A communist deputy declared: "Going to Berlin, is making oneself am accomplice of the torturers...." Nevertheless, on 9 July, when the whole of the French right voted “for” the participation of France in the Olympic Games of Berlin, whilst the left (French Communist Party included) abstained itself — with the particularly notable exception of Pierre Mendès France, who would become Prime Minister under the Fourth Republic and negotiate the peace agreements with the Viet-minh in Indochina in 1954. The Communist Party had been, before this vote, a main supporter of the People's Olympiad.

Nevertheless, several French sportsmen decided to boycott the Berlin Olympic Games anyway, and go to Barcelona where the People's Olympiads were scheduled to begin on 19 July 1936. Each stop in the train stations were the occasion of popular and joyful demonstrations, with people singing The Internationale. However, on the eve of the opening ceremony, General Franco's military pronunciamento, declared from Spanish Morocco, started the Spanish Civil War (1936-1939).

After having left the under-secretary's department, Lagrange then became president of the lay Committee of the youth hostels. With the 1939 declaration of war, although a deputy, he voluntarily joined the military command, before being killed on 9 June 1940 in Évergnicourt by shrapnel.

“He died in courage, in search of the truth and dignity. He was a man whom we loved.”
André Malraux

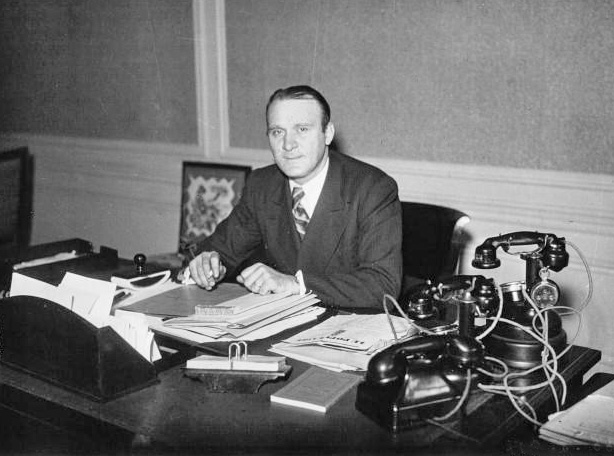
Lagrange as Under-Secretary of State for Youth and Leisure (1936)

Lagrange, who was opposed to professional sports and was against their development in France, had been:

- Under Secretary of State for Youth and Leisure, 4 June 1936 to 22 June 1937 in the 1st Léon Blum government,
- Under-Secretary of State for Sport, Leisure and Physical Education -i.e. Minister for Sports-, 23 June 1937 to 14 January 1938 in the 3rd Camille Chautemps government,
- Under-Secretary of State for Sports, Leisure and Physical Education -i.e. Minister for Sports-, 14 March 1938 to 10 April 1938 in the 2nd Léon Blum government.

== Mass and professional sport ==
Quotation from some of Léo Lagrange's speeches:

- “ In sport, we must choose between two conceptions:
  - the first is summarized as sport as a spectacle and a practice restricted to a relatively small number of privileged people,
  - according to the second design, while not neglecting the spectacular aspect and the creation of champions, it is on the side of the great masses on which we have to carry out the main effort.
  We want the worker, the peasant and the unemployed person to find in leisure the joy of living and the feeling of their dignity ”.
  (Léo Lagrange, speech of 10 June 1936.)
- " Our simple and human goal, is to allow to the masses of French youths to find in the practice of sport, joy and health and to build an organization of leisure activities so that the workers can find relaxation and a reward to their hard labour. "
  (Léo Lagrange, Under Secretary of State to Youth and at the Leisures, 1936.)
- " Our concern is less to create champions and to lead into the Stadium 22 players in front of 40,000 or 100,000 spectators, than to invite the youths of our country to regularly go and enter onto the pitch of the stadiums, of the playing fields, to the swimming pool ".
  (Léo Lagrange, discussion of the budget in the French National Assembly, 1937, quoted by J.P.Callède, ibid)
- " If we have to make a joint effort in the sporting field, like in numerous others, it is a moral effort. I listened with a great interest to Mr. Temple who revealed the frightening dangers of the development of professional sport. Alas! when it is accepted that a human gesture which, by its nature has to be disinterested, becomes the source of important profits, the right measurement is very difficult to determine.
  I believe that the day when it has been admitted that play in the stadiums can be the source of important profits, we will have strongly destroyed the morality of sport.
  Also, with all my force and whatever the criticism, sometimes severe, of my action, I will oppose myself to the development of professional sport in our country. I hold in Parliament the responsibility to act in the interest of all the French youth, and not to create a new circus spectacle"
  (Léo Lagrange, Under-Secretary of State for Sport, Leisure and Physical Education -i.e. Minister for the Sport-, defines and specifies his policy, 3 December 1937, in front of the French National Assembly.)

=== Sports and the SFIO ===
At the same time, Fascism was instrumentalizing sports for a militarist end, while the SFIO had denounced it as a "bourgeois" and "reactionary" activity. That is, until the Popular Front, when it began to use it as a military and patriotic preparation, in anticipation of a conflict with Nazi Germany. Some SFIO members were not immune to the scientific racism discourse of the times. Thus, Georges Barthélémy, SFIO deputy, could declare that sport contributes to the "improvement of relations between capital and labour, henceforth to the elimination of the concept of class struggle," in a perfect corporatist conception. Barthélémy also considered sport as a "mean to prevent the moral and physical degeneration of the race." In this light, as well as in the modern professionalisation and mediatization of sports, Léo Lagrange's conception takes all its sense, both in opposition to his times and in its modernity.

== Posthumous homage ==
- The Socialist Party created a popular association of education bearing its name: National Federation Léo Lagrange.
- The Paris Metro station Villejuif - Léo Lagrange is named for him.
- Many streets in France are named after him.

== See also ==
- Popular Front (1936-1938)

== Sources ==
- First draft: La Vie Rémoise, sport documents, parliamentary documents
- Main source for Lagrange and the People's Olympiad: "Le 9 juillet 1936, le Front populaire choisit les Jeux Olympiques d'Hitler plutôt que les Olympiades populaires de Barcelone", Le Monde libertaire, Summer 2006 (available here with photos, etc.)
