= List of presidents of Alsace =

This is the list of presidents of Alsace since 1974. Regional legislatures are directly elected since 1986.

Presidents of Alsace
President	Party	Term	References
André Bord	UDR	1974-1976	
Pierre Schiélé	RPR	1976-1980	
Marcel Rudloff	UDF-CDS	1980-1996	
Adrien Zeller	UDF/UMP	1996-2009	
André Reichardt	UMP	2009-2010	
Philippe Richert	UMP	2010-2015	
