= Gaston Monnerville =

French politician (1897–1991)

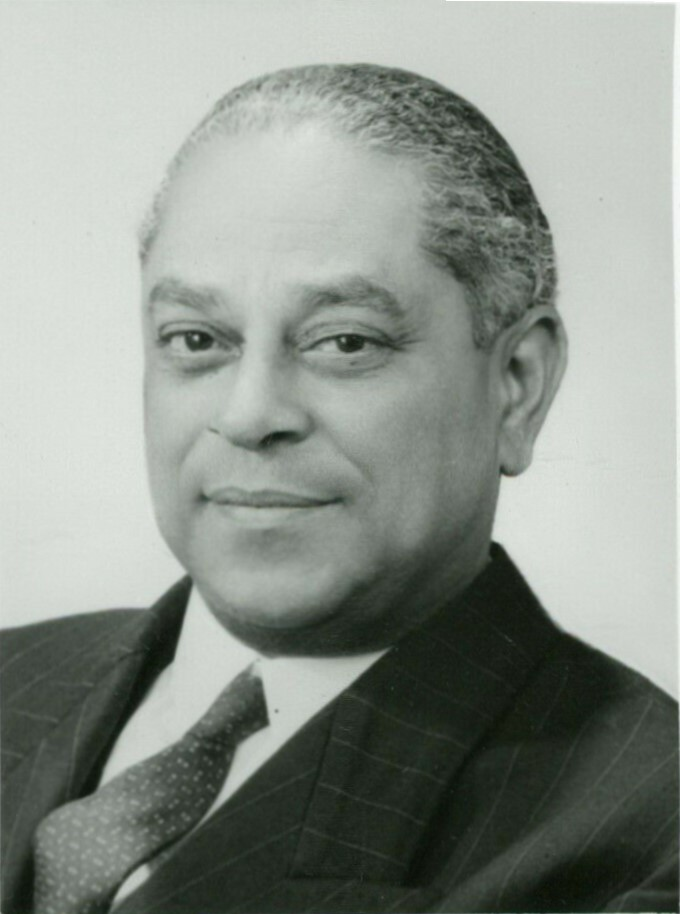
- Monnerville in 1947

Member of the Constitutional Council
- In office 5 March 1974 – 3 March 1983
- Appointed by: Alain Poher
- President: Roger Frey
- Preceded by: François Luchaire
- Succeeded by: Léon Jozeau-Marigné

President of the Senate
- In office 9 December 1958 – 2 October 1968
- Preceded by: Himself (as President of the Council of Republic)
- Succeeded by: Alain Poher

President of the Council of the Republic
- In office 18 March 1947 – 2 October 1958
- Preceded by: Auguste Champetier de Ribes
- Succeeded by: Himself (as President of the Senate)

Personal details
- Born: 2 January 1897 Cayenne, French Guiana
- Died: 7 November 1991 (aged 94) 16th arrondissement of Paris, France
- Party: Radical Party
- Education: University of Toulouse
- Occupation: Lawyer
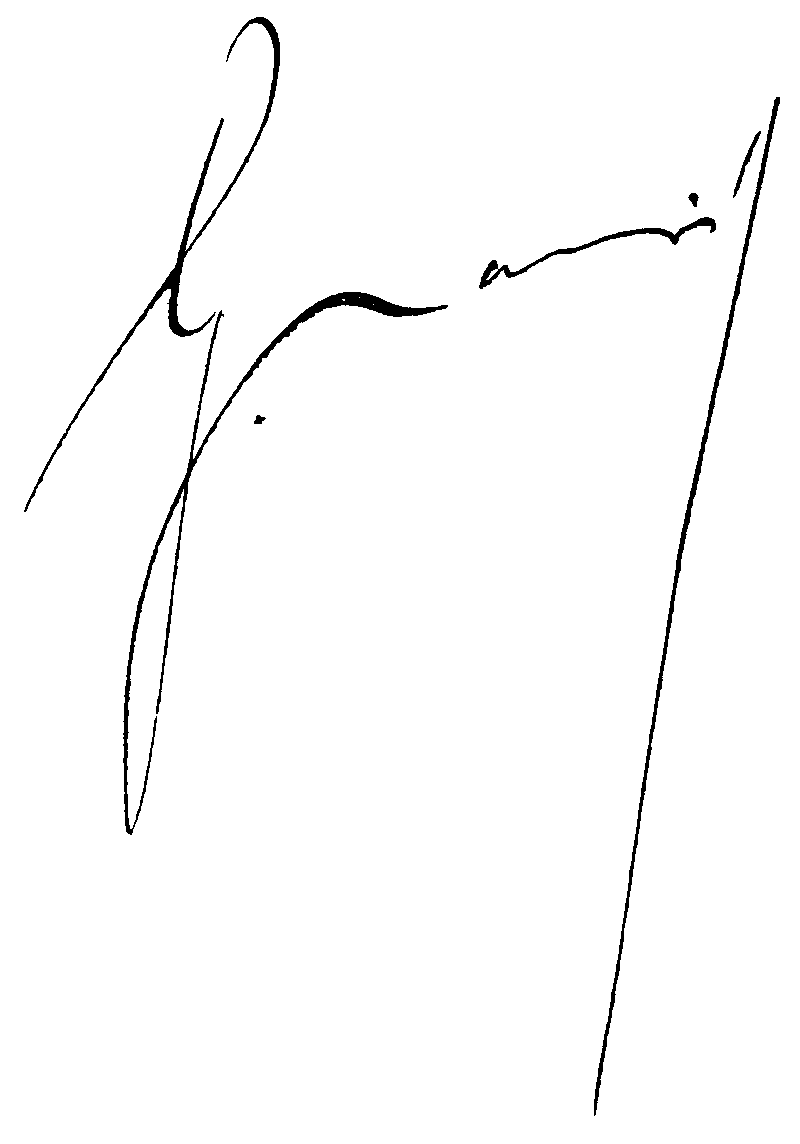
- Signature

Gaston Monnerville (2 January 1897 – 7 November 1991) was a French Radical politician and lawyer who served as the first President of the Senate under the Fifth Republic from 1958 to 1968. He previously served as President of the Council of the Republic from 1947 to 1958. A member of the French Resistance in World War II, he is the first black person to preside over a national parliamentary body in French history.

== Early life ==
The grandson of a slave on his mother's side, Monnerville grew up in French Guiana and went to Toulouse School of Law to complete his undergraduate and doctoral studies on restitution and unjust enrichment. A brilliant student, he became a lawyer in 1918 and worked with César Campinchi, a lawyer who later became an influential politician.

== Political and military career ==
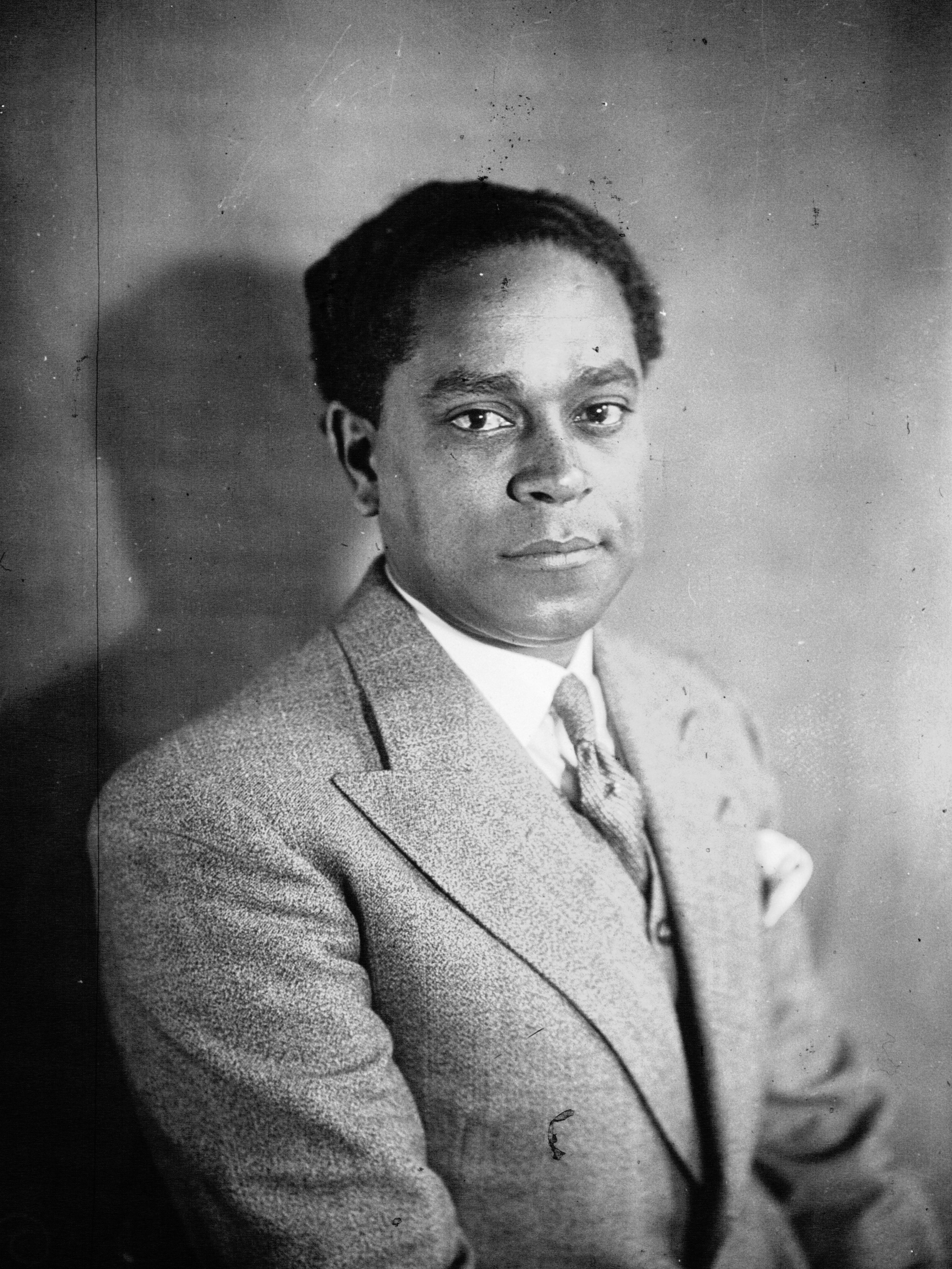
Monnerville as a member of the Chamber of Deputies in 1932

After joining the Radical Party, Monnerville was elected a member of the Chamber of Deputies for French Guiana in 1932. He was reelected in 1936. He was Undersecretary of State for Colonies in the government of Prime Minister Camille Chautemps of 1937–1938.

=== WWII and French Resistance ===
During the first part of World War II, he served in the French Navy, on the battleship Provence. He was not demobilized until 17 July 1940, well after the French defeat by Nazi Germany, and therefore did not get to vote on the grant of dictatorial powers to Marshal Pétain. He protested against the armistice signed by Pétain, and complained about the treatment of French colonial subjects by Petain's Vichy government. In late 1940, he joined Combat, one of the major groups in the resistance. As a lawyer in Marseille, in unoccupied France, he defended persons arrested or persecuted by the Vichy government for their opinions or racial origin. For this he was repeatedly threatened or arrested by the Vichy police.

When Germany occupied the rest of France in 1942, he went underground and joined the Maquis of Auvergne, as "Commandant St-Just". He and his wife Cheylade established a military hospital in June 1944.

That fall he was demobilized, before was appointed by the Radical Party to sit in the Provisional Consultative Assembly of the restored government.

=== Postwar political career ===
In 1945, he was appointed chairman of a commission to determine the future status of the French colonies. In October 1945, he was elected Delegate from French Guiana to the First Constituent Assembly of the Fourth Republic, and to the Second Constituent Assembly in April 1946. Also in 1946, he was a French delegate to the first session of the United Nations. He was defeated for election to the Third Constituent Assembly in November 1946, in part because some Guianese objected to his efforts to close the prison colony of Devil's Island.

Instead he was named to the Council of the Republic of France (the Senate), which was being reconstituted by appointments. He was immediately elected President of this Council, and became one of the most active members of the Senate. In March 1947, he was chosen President of the Council, by a vote of 141 to 131 over the Communist candidate.

In 1948, he changed his residence from Guiana to Lot, and was elected Senator there. He served as Senator from Lot and President of the Council until the end of the Fourth Republic in 1958.

In 1958, Monnerville supported Charles de Gaulle in returning to power, but he objected to De Gaulle's dissolution of the Fourth Republic. However, when the Fifth Republic was established, he resumed his place in the Senate (now called by that name); he was elected President of the Senate (the second highest-ranking official in France after the President) in 1959, serving until 1968.

In 1962, he famously opposed the referendum altering the constitution for changing the method of election of the president to a direct election, instead of an electoral college, on grounds that the method for constitutional amendments was not respected, a reform strongly desired by Charles de Gaulle. The Constitutional Council however ruled itself "incompetent" to strike down a reform voted by the French people. He went as far as to use the strong word of forfaiture ("abuse of authority") against the behaviour of Prime Minister Georges Pompidou, who had accepted to sign the referendum project.

From 1974 to 1983, he was a member of the Constitutional Council of France.7

== Honors and awards ==
- Officer of the Order of Legion of Honour (1983)
- Knight of the Order of Legion of Honour (1947)
- Croix de guerre 1939-1945
- Resistance Medal
- Grand Cross of the Order of Saint Charles
- Grand Cross of the National Order of Chad
- Grand Cross of the Order of Glory (Tunisia)

Political offices
Preceded by Auguste Champetier de Ribes	President of the Council of the Republic; 1947–1958	Formation of the Fifth Republic
End of the Fourth Republic	President of the Senate; 1958–1968	Succeeded by Alain Poher
Legal offices
Preceded by François Luchaire	Member of the Constitutional Council; 1974–1983	Succeeded by Léon Jozeau-Marigné
