= Pierre Pasquini =

French politician

Minister of Veterans Affairs and Victims of War
- In office 18 May 1995 – 2 June 1997
- President: Jacques Chirac
- Prime Minister: Alain Juppé
- Preceded by: Philippe Mestre
- Succeeded by: Jean-Pierre Masseret

Personal details
- Born: 16 February 1921 Sétif, Algeria
- Died: 2 March 2006 (aged 85) Nice, France
- Party: RPR
- Profession: Lawyer

Pierre Pasquini (16 February 1921 in Sétif, Algeria – 2 March 2006 in Nice, France) was a French politician, who served as Minister of Veterans Affairs and Victims of War from 1995 to 1997.
