= Jean Ybarnégaray =

French Basque politician (1883–1956)

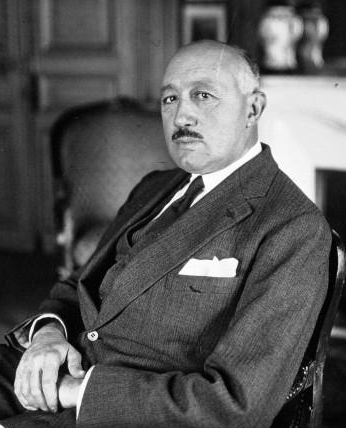
- Ybarnégaray in 1932

Minister of State
- In office 10 May 1940 – 10 July 1940
- Prime Minister: Paul Reynaud; Philippe Pétain

Minister of Veterans and Family Affairs
- In office 16 June 1940 – 6 September 1940
- Prime Minister: Philippe Pétain; Pierre Laval
- Preceded by: Albert Rivière
- Succeeded by: André Diethelm

Personal details
- Born: 16 October 1883 Uhart-Cize, France
- Died: 25 April 1956 (aged 72) Paris, France
- Party: Republican Federation (until 1938); French Social Party (from 1938)
- Education: University of Paris; Bordeaux University

Military service
- Allegiance: France
- Battles/wars: World War I
- Awards: Legion of Honour

Michel Albert Jean Joseph Ybarnégaray (French pronunciation: [ʒɑ̃ ibaʁneɡaʁɛ]; 16 October 1883 – 25 April 1956) was a French Basque politician and founder of the International Federation of Basque Pelota.

Jean Ybarnegaray was born in Uhart-Cize, Department of Pyrénées-Atlantiques, then called Basses Pyrénées, in the Northern Basque Country. He studied law at the Sorbonne and Bordeaux University and practised as a lawyer. He was elected to the Chamber of Deputies in April 1914.

On the outbreak of the First World War, he was recalled to service. He was wounded and discharged from the army with the Legion of Honour, returning to the Chamber of Deputies, where he criticised the Nivelle Offensive of 1917, the armistice of 1918 and the Treaty of Versailles.

A member of the Republican Federation, Ybarnegaray joined the French Social Party of François de La Rocque in 1938. He served as Minister of State in Paul Reynaud's government from 10 May 1940. On arrival of refugees from the Basque (1937) and Catalan fronts (1939) in the Spanish Civil War, Ybarnegaray took a hostile stance against the exiles, labeling them as "reds" and turned a cold shoulder to Basque nationalism or any Basque political approach.

He served in the French State government in the first cabinet of Marshal Philippe Pétain as Minister for Veterans and the Family. He resigned his office on 6 September 1940.

Ybarnegaray had undertaken French Resistance activities, assisting escapees in crossing the Pyrenees, for which he was arrested in 1943 and detained in Plansee in the state of Tyrol. Although he was sentenced after the war to losing civil rights, his Resistance activities resulted in the sentence being suspended.

He died in Paris on 25 April 1956.
