= Camille Chautemps =

French politician (1885–1963)

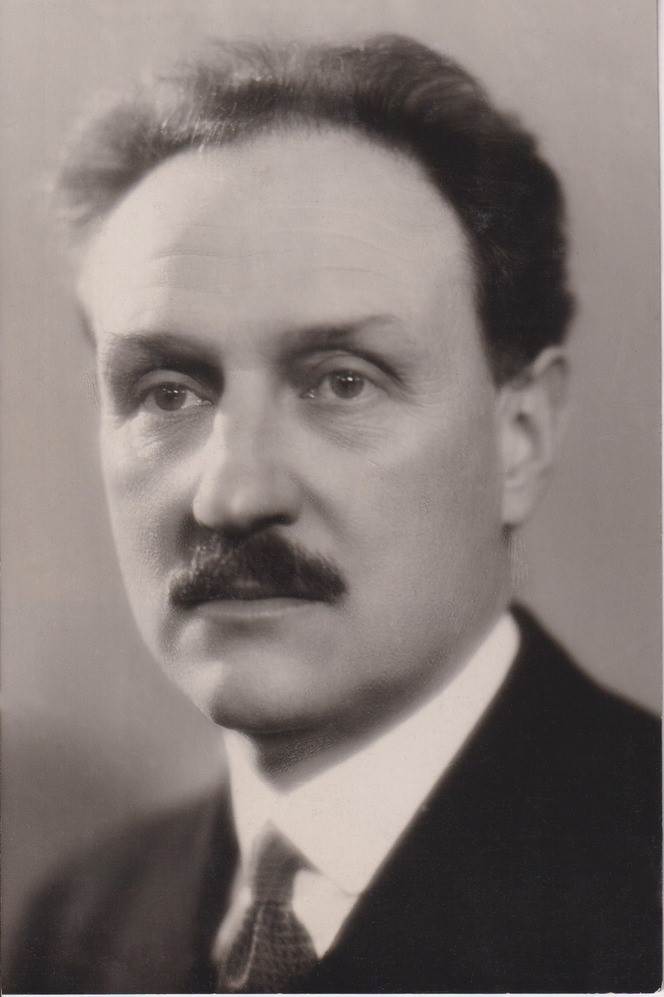
- Chautemps c. 1930

Prime Minister of France
- In office 22 June 1937 – 13 March 1938
- President: Albert Lebrun
- Preceded by: Léon Blum
- Succeeded by: Léon Blum
- In office 26 November 1933 – 30 January 1934
- President: Albert Lebrun
- Preceded by: Albert Sarraut
- Succeeded by: Édouard Daladier
- In office 21 February 1930 – 2 March 1930
- President: Gaston Doumergue
- Preceded by: André Tardieu
- Succeeded by: André Tardieu

Personal details
- Born: 1 February 1885 Paris, France
- Died: 1 July 1963 (aged 78) Washington, D.C., United States
- Party: Radical

Camille Chautemps (French: [kamij ʃotɑ̃]; 1 February 1885 – 1 July 1963) was a French Radical politician of the Third Republic, three times President of the Council of Ministers (Prime Minister).

He was the father-in-law of U.S. politician and statesman Howard J. Samuels.

== Early life ==
Born into a family of Radical politicians, Camille Chautemps was a lawyer by training and a noted amateur rugby-player in his youth, playing for Tours Rugby and Stade Français. He was inducted into the Grand Orient of France (1906, master 1908), quitting the Freemasons in August 1940 as anti-masonic regulation was adopted by Pétain.

== Early career ==
He entered local politics in the fiefdom of his parliamentarian uncle, Alphonse Chautemps, and followed a political career path typical of many Radical-Socialists: first elected town councillor for Tours (1912), then mayor (1919–25), parliamentary deputy (1919–34) and senator (1934–40). Chautemps was considered one of the chief figures of the 'right' (anti-socialist and pro-liberal) wing of the centre-left Radical-Socialist Party. Between 1924 and 1926, he served in the centre-left coalition governments of Édouard Herriot, Paul Painlevé and Aristide Briand.

=== Twice prime minister ===
Renowned as a skilful negotiator with friends from across the party divide, he was called upon on several occasions to attempt to build support for a coalition of the centre-left. He first became President of the Council for a short-lived government in 1930. After the electoral victory of the left in 1934, he served as Interior Minister and became head of government once more in November 1933. The revelations of the Stavisky Affair, a corruption scandal, tarnished two of his ministers, sparking violent protests by the far-right leagues. He resigned his posts on 27 January 1934, when the opposition press attributed Stavisky's suicide to a government cover-up.

=== Deputy Prime minister and last premiership ===
In Léon Blum's Popular Front government of 1936, Chautemps represented the Radical-Socialist Party as a Minister of State and succeeded Blum at the head of the government from June 1937 to March 1938. The franc was devalued, but government finances remained in difficulty. Pursuing the program of the Popular Front, he proceeded in the nationalisation of the railroads to create the SNCF. However, in January 1938, he formed a new government consisting solely of ministers from the nonsocialist republican centre- left. His government fell on 10 March.

=== Runup to World War II ===
Chautemps subsequently served from April 1938 to May 1940 as Deputy Prime Minister in the governments of Édouard Daladier and Paul Reynaud. After the latter resigned, as he was again deputy prime minister, now to Marshal Philippe Pétain.

== World War II ==
France declared war on Germany in September 1939, and in May 1940, the German Army invaded and swept aside all opposition. With the fall of Dunkirk on 5 June and the defeat of the French Army imminent, Chautemps dined with Paul Baudouin on the 8th, and declared that the war must be ended and that Pétain saw his position most clearly. On the 11th, during a Cabinet meeting, Chautemps suggested for Churchill to be invited back to France to discuss the hopeless situation; he attended a conference at Tours. The Cabinet met again on the 15th and was almost evenly split on the question of an armistice with Germany. Chautemps now suggested that to break the deadlock, that they should get a neutral authority to enquire what the German terms would be, which if honourable, the Cabinet could agree to study. If not, the Cabinet would agree to fight on. The Chautemps proposal passed by 13 to 6.

On 16 June, Charles de Gaulle, now in London, telephoned Reynaud to give him the British government's offer of joint nationality for French and British in a Franco-British union. A delighted Reynaud put it to a stormy Cabinet meeting and was supported by five of his ministers. Most of the others were persuaded against him by the arguments of Pétain, Chautemps and Jean Ybarnégaray, the last two seeing the offer as a device to make France subservient to Britain as an extra dominion. Georges Mandel, who had a Jewish background, was flinging accusations of cowardice around the room, and Chautemps and others replied in kind. Reynaud clearly would not accept Chautemps's proposal and later resigned.

== Later life ==
On 10 July 1940, Chautemps voted as a Senator in favour of granting the cabinet presided by Marshal Philippe Pétain authority to draw up a new constitution, thereby effectively ending the French Third Republic and establishing Vichy France. However, Chautemps broke with Pétain's government after he had arrived in the United States on an official mission and lived there for much of the rest of his life. After World War II, a French court convicted him in absentia for collaborating with the enemy; he was amnestied in 1954.

After his death in Washington, DC, he was laid to rest in the Rock Creek Cemetery.

== Chautemps's First Ministry, 21 February – 2 March 1930 ==
- Camille Chautemps (Radical) – President of the Council and Minister of the Interior
- Aristide Briand (PRS) – Minister of Foreign Affairs
- René Besnard (Radical) – Minister of War
- Charles Dumont (AD) – Minister of Finance
- Maurice Palmade (Radical) – Minister of Budget
- Louis Loucheur (RI) – Minister of Labour, Hygiene, Welfare Work, and Social Security Provisions
- Théodore Steeg (Radical) – Minister of Justice
- Albert Sarraut (Radical) – Minister of Marine
- Charles Daniélou (RI) – Minister of Merchant Marine
- Laurent Eynac (RI) – Minister of Air
- Jean Durand (Radical) – Minister of Public Instruction and Fine Arts
- Claudius Gallet – Minister of Pensions
- Henri Queuille (Radical) – Minister of Agriculture
- Lucien Lamoureux (Radical) – Minister of Colonies
- Édouard Daladier (Radical) – Minister of Public Works
- Julien Durand (Radical) – Minister of Posts, Telegraphs, and Telephones
- Georges Bonnet (Radical) – Minister of Commerce and Industry

== Chautemps's Second Ministry, 26 November 1933 – 30 January 1934 ==
- Camille Chautemps – President of the Council and Minister of the Interior – Radical Socialist Party
- Joseph Paul-Boncour – Minister of Foreign Affairs
- Édouard Daladier – Minister of War
- Georges Bonnet – Minister of Finance
- Paul Marchandeau – Minister of Budget
- Lucien Lamoureux – Minister of Labour and Social Security Provisions
- Eugène Raynaldy – Minister of Justice
- Albert Sarraut – Minister of Marine
- Eugène Frot – Minister of Merchant Marine
- Pierre Cot – Minister of Air
- Anatole de Monzie – Minister of National Education
- Hippolyte Ducos – Minister of Pensions
- Henri Queuille – Minister of Agriculture
- Albert Dalimier – Minister of Colonies
- Joseph Paganon – Minister of Public Works
- Alexandre Israël – Minister of Public Health
- Jean Mistler – Minister of Posts, Telegraphs, and Telephones
- Laurent Eynac – Minister of Commerce and Industry

Changes

- 9 January 1934 – Lucien Lamoureux succeeds Dalimier as Minister of Colonies. Eugène Frot succeeds Lamoureux as Minister of Labour and Social Security Provisions. William Bertrand succeeds Frot as Minister of Merchant Marine.

== Chautemps's Third Ministry, 22 June 1937 – 18 January 1938 ==
- Camille Chautemps – President of the Council – Radical Socialist Party
- Léon Blum – Vice President of the Council – French Section of the Workers' International (SFIO)
- Yvon Delbos – Minister of Foreign Affairs – Radical Socialist Party
- Édouard Daladier – Minister of National Defense and War – Radical Socialist Party
- Marx Dormoy – Minister of the Interior – SFIO
- Georges Bonnet – Minister of Finance – Radical Socialist Party
- André Février – Minister of Labour – SFIO
- Vincent Auriol – Minister of Justice – SFIO
- César Campinchi – Minister of Marine – Radical Socialist Party
- Pierre Cot – Minister of Air – Radical Socialist Party
- Jean Zay – Minister of National Education – Radical Socialist Party
- Albert Rivière – Minister of Pensions – SFIO
- Georges Monnet – Minister of Agriculture – Radical Socialist Party
- Marius Moutet – Minister of Colonies – SFIO
- Henri Queuille – Minister of Public Works – Radical Socialist Party
- Marc Rucart – Minister of Public Health – Radical Socialist Party
- Jean-Baptiste Lebas – Minister of Posts, Telegraphs, and Telephones – SFIO
- Fernand Chapsal – Minister of Commerce
- Paul Faure – Minister of State – SFIO
- Maurice Viollette – Minister of State – usr
- Albert Sarraut – Minister of State – Radical Socialist Party
- Léo Lagrange – Under-Secretary of State for the Sports, the Leisure activities and the Physical Education -i.e. acting like Minister for the Sports- – SFIO

== Chautemps's Fourth Ministry, 18 January – 13 March 1938 ==
- Camille Chautemps – President of the Council – Radical Socialist Party
- Édouard Daladier – Vice President of the Council and Minister of National Defense and War
- Yvon Delbos – Minister of Foreign Affairs
- Albert Sarraut – Minister of the Interior
- Paul Marchandeau – Minister of Finance
- Paul Ramadier – Minister of Labour
- César Campinchi – Minister of Justice
- William Bertrand – Minister of Military Marine
- Paul Elbel – Minister of Merchant Marine
- Guy La Chambre – Minister of Air
- Jean Zay – Minister of National Education
- Robert Lassalle – Minister of Pensions
- Fernand Chapsal – Minister of Agriculture
- Théodore Steeg – Minister of Colonies
- Henri Queuille – Minister of Public Works
- Marc Rucart – Minister of Public Health
- Fernand Gentin – Minister of Posts, Telegraphs, and Telephones
- Pierre Cot – Minister of Commerce
- Georges Bonnet – Minister of State
- Ludovic-Oscar Frossard – Minister of State in charge of the Services of the Presidency of the Council

Political offices
Preceded by Anatole de Monzie	Minister of Justice; 1925	Succeeded by René Renoult
Preceded by André Tardieu	Prime Minister of France; 1930	Succeeded by André Tardieu
Preceded by Albert Sarraut	Prime Minister of France; 1933–1934	Succeeded by Édouard Daladier
Preceded by Léon Blum	Prime Minister of France; 1937–1938	Succeeded by Léon Blum
