= Léon Aimé =

French politician (1924–2021)

Member of the National Assembly
- In office 2 May 1993 – 21 April 1997
- Preceded by: Philippe Mestre
- Succeeded by: Dominique Caillaud
- Constituency: Vendée 2

General Councillor of Vendée
- In office 15 May 1981 – 23 March 2001
- Preceded by: Henri Caillemer

Mayor of Moutiers-les-Mauxfaits
- In office 20 April 1975 – 24 June 1995
- Preceded by: Corentin Riou
- Succeeded by: Gérard Commailleau

Personal details
- Born: 9 February 1924 Longeville-sur-Mer, Vendée, France
- Died: 31 August 2021 (aged 97)
- Party: UDF
- Occupation: farmer

Léon Aimé (9 February 1924 – 31 August 2021) was a French politician.

Aimé was born in Longeville-sur-Mer, and became a farmer in Moutiers-les-Mauxfaits. In 1965, he was elected to the municipal council, then became deputy mayor in 1971. Aimé won the mayoralty in 1975, and remained in office until 1995. Several terms in other political offices overlapped with Aimé's tenure as mayor. He was selected to replace Henri Caillemer, who had died in office, on the General Council of Vendée, in 1981. Aimé stepped down from the general council in 2001. From 1993 to 1997, Aimé was a member of the National Assembly, replacing Philippe Mestre, who had been appointed Minister of Veterans Affairs.

Aimé was awarded officer of the Order of Agricultural Merit, officier Ordre des Palmes académiques, and knight of the Legion of Honour. Aimé died, aged 97, on 31 August 2021. At the time of Léon Aimé's death, his son, Christian Aimé, was serving a second term as mayor of Moutiers-les-Mauxfaits.
