= Council of the Republic (France) =

Upper house of the French Parliament under the Fourth Republic

Council of the Republic Conseil de la République
- 1st, 2nd, 3rd, 4th and 5th Councils of the Fourth Republic
- Insignia of the Council

Type
- Type: Upper house of the French Parliament

History
- Founded: 27 October 1946
- Disbanded: 8 December 1958
- Preceded by: Constituent Assembly (Note: Single chamber. The Parliament of the Provisional Government was unicameral.) (Provisional Government)
- Succeeded by: Senate (Fifth Republic)

Leadership
- President: Auguste Champetier de Ribes, MRP (1946–1947)
- Gaston Monnerville, RS (1947–1958)

Structure
- Seats: 320
- Length of term: 6 years

Elections
- Voting system: Indirect universal suffrage
- First election: 8 December 1946
- Last election: 8 June 1958

Meeting place
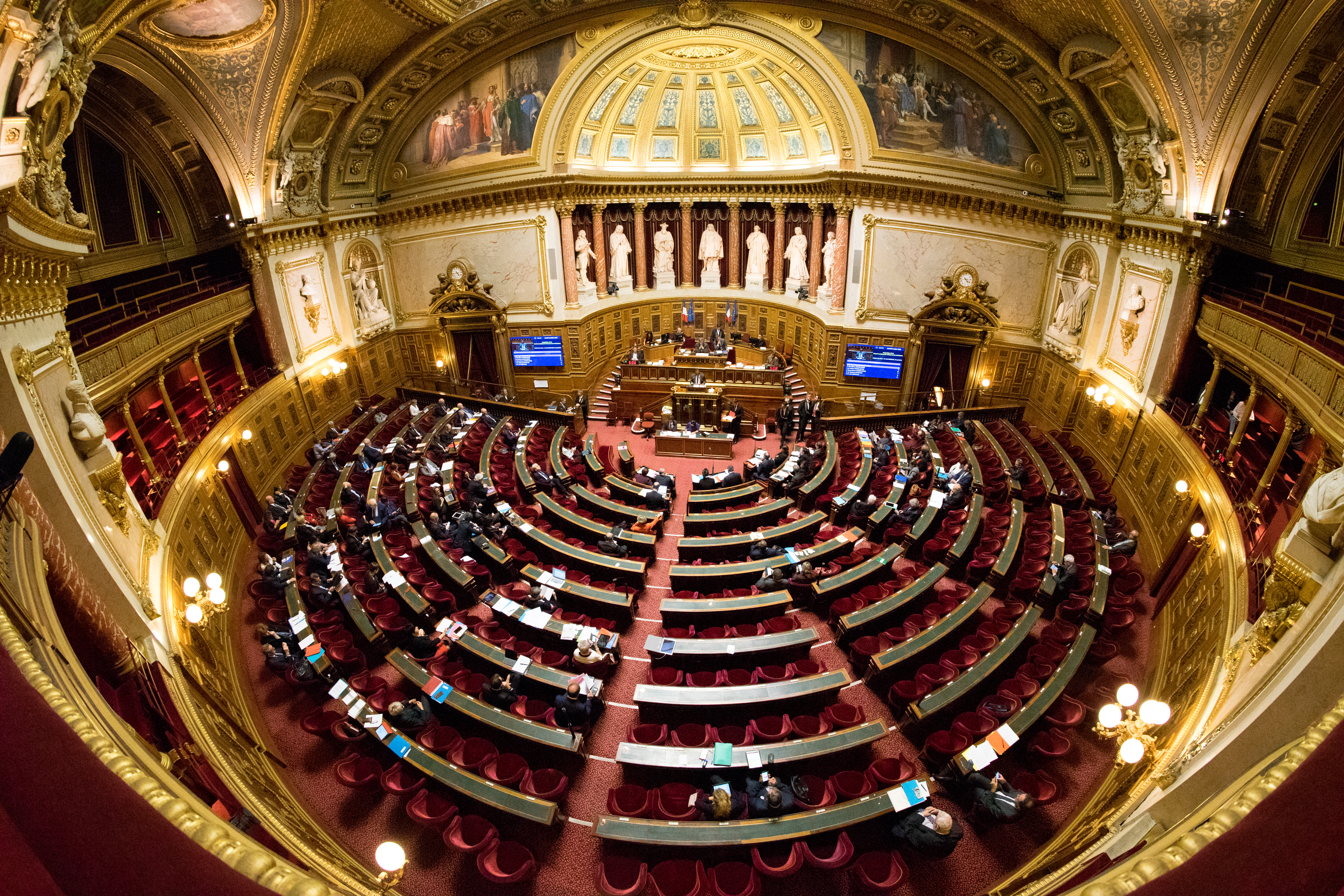
- Salle des Séances; Luxembourg Palace; Paris, French Republic

Website
- Archives

The Council of the Republic (French: Conseil de la République, [kɔ̃sɛj d(ə) la ʁepyblik]) was the upper house of the French Parliament under the Fourth Republic, with the National Assembly being the lower house. It was established by the Constitution of 1946, dissolved by the Constitution of 1958 and replaced with the current-day Senate.

== History ==
The constitution of the Fourth Republic, which came into force in 1946, stipulated that parliament was bicameral. The upper house was named the "Council of the Republic" (as opposed to the Senate of the Third Republic) and was granted greatly diminished powers.

== Role ==
The council did not have the power to make laws, which was the responsibility of the National Assembly. The council was mainly consultative, and bills were only given a single reading at the council before being passed.

However, it did share responsibility should the need arose to amend the constitution in matters regarding the election of the President of the Republic. A formal notice to the council was required to declare war.

In 1954, the Constitution was amended to provided that all bills would be examined successively by the National Assembly and the Council of the Republic, essentially restoring full legislative powers to the latter.

== Composition ==
Members of the Council were known as '"councillors" (conseiller) from 1946 to 1948, and then "senators" from 1948 onwards. The number of senators had to be between 250 and 320. Senators were elected by indirect universal suffrage: five-sixths were elected by communes and departments; the other one-sixth were elected by the National Assembly, the lower house. They served six-year terms.

=== President ===
The President was the presiding officer of the council.

Political Party: MRP Rad-Soc

Portrait	Name	Took office	Left office	Political Party
1	Auguste Champetier de Ribes	27 December 1946	6 March 1947	MRP
2	Gaston Monnerville	18 March 1947	4 October 1958	Rad-Soc
