= Maurice Dormann =

French politician

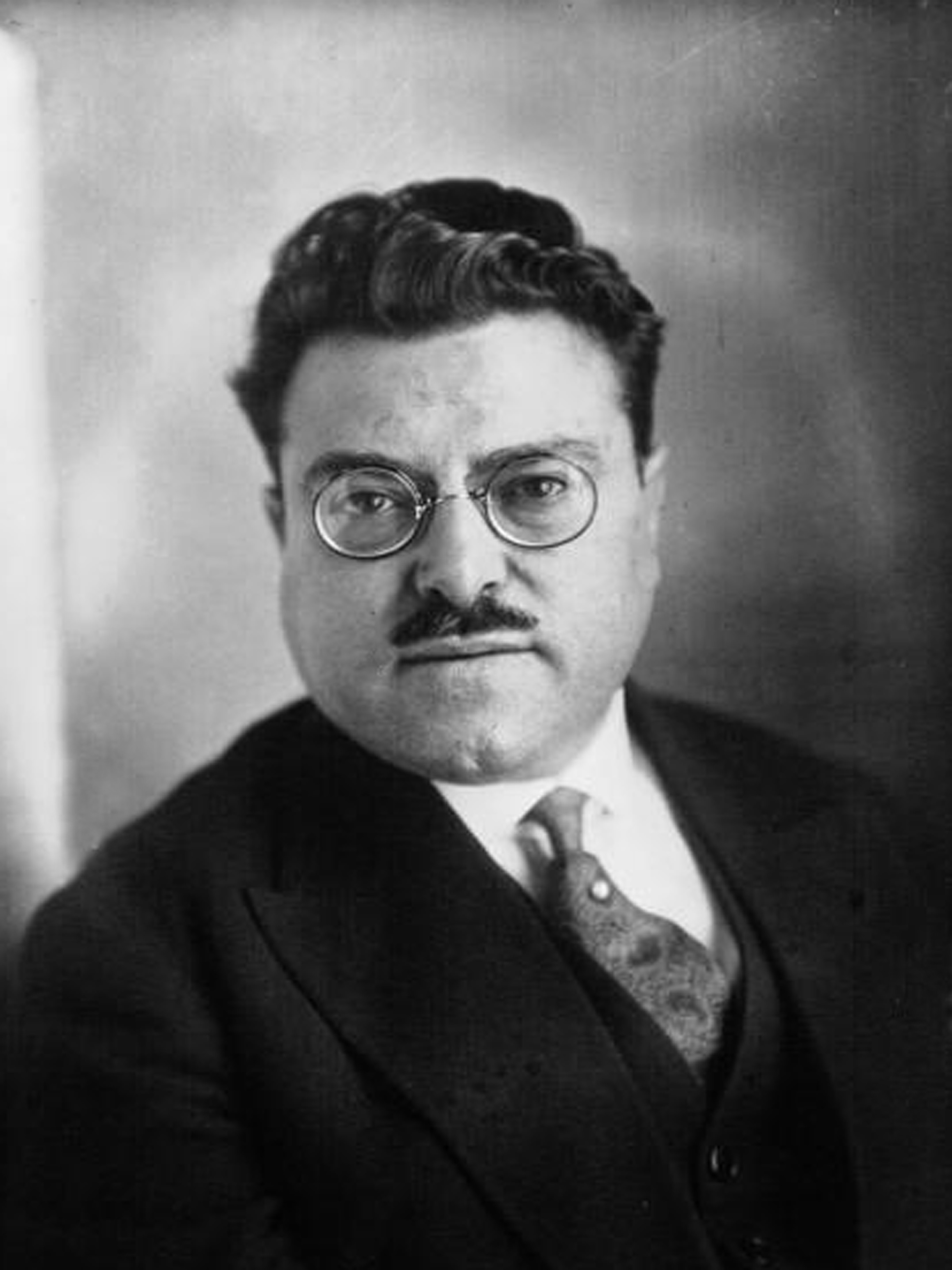

Member of the Chamber of Deputies of France
- In office 1928–1936

Member of the Senate of France
- In office 1936–1944

Personal details
- Born: 20 April 1881 Étréchy, Essonne
- Died: 27 November 1947 (aged 66) Paris

Maurice Dormann (20 April 1881 – 14 November 1947) was a politician in France.

He was born in Etrechy in Essonne and apprenticed as a printer. In 1905, he became manager for the weekly newspaper Le Réveil d’Etampes and a print shop. He served in the army during World War I and was seriously injured by shrapnel fire in 1916, losing his right leg and much of his left knee. He became president of the Fédération des associations de mutilés (Federation of associations for the physically disabled) in Seine-et-Oise in 1919; he helped establish a retirement home for veteran invalids. In 1927, he became president of the Syndicat professionnel des journalistes de Seine-et-Oise.

Dormann was elected to the Chamber of Deputies as a "radical republican" representing Seine-et-Oise in 1928. He was reelected in 1932 as a "radical independent". Dormann served in the cabinet of Théodore Steeg as Minister of Pensions from 23 December 1930 to 27 January 1931. In 1935, he was elected to the French senate for Seine-et-Oise; he stepped down in 1944. During his time in office, Dormann represented the interests of farmers, war veterans and mutualists.

He served on the administrative council for the Fédération nationale de la mutualité française from 1931 to 1939 and was elected as a vice-president in 1946.

Dormann died in Paris at the age of 66.

He was a Commandeur in the Legion of Honour and a recipient of the Croix de Guerre.

His daughter Geneviève Dormann became a well-known novelist.
