= Robert Lassalle =

French politician (1882–1940)

Jean-Robert Lassalle
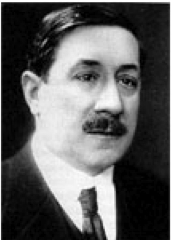

Minister of Pensions
- In office 28 January 1938 – 10 March 1938
- Prime Minister: Camille Chautemps
- Preceded by: Albert Rivière
- Succeeded by: Albert Rivière

Personal details
- Born: 2 June 1882 Soustons, Landes, France
- Died: 14 May 1940 (aged 57) Chémery-sur-Bar, Ardennes, France

Jean-Robert Lassalle (French pronunciation: [ʒɑ̃ ʁɔbɛʁ lasal]; 2 June 1882 – 14 May 1940) was a French politician who was Minister of Pensions for a few weeks in 1938.

== Life ==
Jean-Robert Lassalle was born on 2 June 1882 in Soustons, Landes. His father was a lawyer, mayor and councilor-general of Soustons. Lassalle obtained a Doctorate of Law, then joined the Ministry of Finance and had risen to office manager at the start of World War I (1914–18). Although excused from military service due to the loss of an eye, he enlisted in August 1914 as a private in the 49th infantry regiment and volunteered for the front. He was wounded in the First Battle of the Marne, and also fought at Verdun. He was promoted to second-lieutenant, and in May 1917 was again wounded at Chemin des Dames, and then was taken prisoner on the plateau of Craonne. He was awarded the Croix de Guerre and the Legion of Honor.

Lassalle ran for election to the legislature in November 1919 but did not succeed. Lassalle was elected municipal councilor for Soustons and councilor-general. On 11 May 1924 he was elected deputy for Landes on the platform of the Radical Republican Union and Radical Socialists. In 1926 he played an important role in established the war veteran card. In the 1928 elections he ran in the Dax constituency and was again elected. He was reelected in the first round in 1932. In 1936 he was elected in the second round.

Lassalle was made Honorary President of the National Federation of Republican fighters, and founded the Landes branch of this organization. On 18 January 1938 he was appointed Minister of Pensions in the cabinet of Camille Chautemps. He held office until the cabinet resigned on 10 March 1938. He was responsible for the creation of the Secretary of State for Veterans Affairs. At the start of World War II Lassalle was offered the grade of colonel, but despite his age enlisted as a lieutenant gunner in the 213th Infantry Regiment. During leave periods he returned to the Chamber, where he spoke for the last time on 15 March 1940 on the system of military pay and allowances for reserve NCOs.

Robert Lassalle died in action on 14 May 1940 at Chémery-sur-Bar, Ardennes.

== Sources ==
- "Jean-Robert Lassalle: Mandats" (in French). Assemblée nationale.
- Jolly, Jean (1960–1977). "Lassalle (Jean-Robert)". Dictionnaire des parlementaires français; notices biographiques sur les ministres, députés et sénateurs français de 1889 à 1940 (in French). Paris: Presses universitaires de France. ISBN 2-1100-1998-0.
- "LASSALLE (Jean, Robert)". Histoire sociale des Landes (in French). Conseil général des Landes.
