= Vincent Badie =

French lawyer and politician

- Born: 16 July 1902; Béziers, France
- Died: 8 September 1989 (aged 87); Montpellier, France
- Occupations: lawyer, politician
- Office: Chamber of Deputies of France, National Assembly of France
- Political party: Parti Radical Socialiste

Vincent Badie (16 July 1902 – 8 September 1989) was a French lawyer and politician.

== Biography ==
Vincent Henri Badie was born in Béziers and practised as a lawyer at Montpellier. He was elected as Radical Party (PRS: Parti Radical Socialiste) candidate to the Chamber of Deputies in 1936 representing Hérault. He also served as mayor of Paulhan.

During the Second World War, in June 1940, he was one of the 80 who voted against the grant of special powers to Philippe Pétain and the creation of the Vichy régime. "Vive la République quand même!" (Long live the Republic all the same!). His opposition to Vichy led to his removal as mayor in 1941, and he was arrested and deported to Dachau concentration camp.

After the war he was again elected to parliament, again serving in the lower chamber, now called the National Assembly. He represented Hérault until 1958.

He served in government under Edgar Faure as Minister of Veterans and War Victims from 20 October 1955 to 1 February 1956 and again under Pierre Pflimlin from 14 May 1958 to 1 June 1958.

He did not support Charles de Gaulle in 1958 and opposed the creation of the Fifth French Republic. He died at Montpellier.

Historian Jean Sagnes published a series of interviews with Badie in Vive la République (Toulouse, 1987).
