= Geneviève Dormann =

French journalist and novelist

- Born: 24 September 1933; Paris, France
- Died: 13 February 2015 (aged 81); Paris, France
- Occupations: Journalist, novelist

Geneviève Dormann (24 September 1933 – 13 February 2015) was a French journalist and novelist.

== Biography ==
The daughter of politician Maurice Dormann, she was born in Paris. Dormann worked as a journalist for the magazine Marie Claire, and for the newspaper Le Figaro. In 1957, she published her first book La Première pierre, a collection of stories. She was awarded the Prix des Quatre-Jurys in 1971 for Je t'apporterai des orages and the Prix des Deux Magots for her 1974 novel Le Bateau du courrier.

In 1981, Dormann received the Grand Prix de la ville de Paris for her work. The following year, Le Roman de Sophie Trébuchet, about Victor Hugo's mother, received the prix Kléber Haedens.

In 1989, she was awarded the Grand Prix du roman de l'Académie française for Le Bal du dodo. Her 1999 novel Adieu, phénomène received the Prix Maurice Genevoix.

She was one of the scriptwriters for the 1976 film Coup de Grâce. The main characters in her books are often strong-willed modern women.

Dormann married the painter Philippe Lejeune and they had three children; they later divorced. She next married the writer Jean-Loup Dabadie; that marriage also ended in divorce.
