= Fernand Gentin =

French politician (1876–1946)

- Gentin in 1935, from a calling card

Minister of Posts, Telegraphs, and Telephones
- In office 18 January 1938 – 13 March 1938
- Prime Minister: Camille Chautemps
- Preceded by: Jean-Baptiste Lebas
- Succeeded by: Jean-Baptiste Lebas

Minister of Health
- In office 13 March 1938 – 10 April 1938
- Prime Minister: Léon Blum
- Preceded by: Marc Rucart
- Succeeded by: Marc Rucart

Minister of Commerce
- In office 10 April 1938 – 20 March 1940
- Prime Minister: Édouard Daladier
- Preceded by: Pierre Cot
- Succeeded by: Louis Rollin

Personal details
- Born: 27 September 1876 Reims, Marne, France
- Died: 24 April 1946 (aged 69) Paris, France

Fernand Gentin (27 September 1876 – 24 April 1946) was a French printer and Radical politician who was a deputy from 1932 to 1942. He was Minister of PTT and then Minister of Health in 1938, and Minister of Commerce from 1938 to 1940. In the period before World War II (1939–45) began he first opposed and then supported letting refugees from Nazi Germany work freely in France. In the early part of the war he promoted continued production of luxury goods to earn money for import of armaments. After the defeat of France, he collaborated with the German occupiers as administrator and political director of a newspaper. He was banned from public office after the Liberation of France.

== Early years (1876–1932) ==
Fernand Gentin was born on 27 September 1876 in Reims, Marne, son of a printer. Gentin completed his education at the age of 20. He worked at the printing shop for a period, then spent ten years working among peasants before succeeding his father in the family business. He was president and chairman of the Grande Imprimerie de Troyes. Gentin became vice chairman of the General Council of the Aube.

== National politics (1932–40) ==
In May 1932 Gentin ran for election in the 3rd district of Troyes, and was elected in the second round. He was elected on 8 May 1932 as deputy for Aube on the Radical Republican and Radical Socialist list. He became mayor of Isle-Aumont and Chairman of the General Council of the Aube. In April 1936 ran again and was reelected in the second round for the same constituency. He was reelected on 3 May 1936 as deputy for Aube on the Radical Republican and Radical Socialist list. He defeated the conservative Fernand Monsacré and the socialist Pierre Brossolette. The Radicals had agreed not to oppose René Plard in the 1st district of Troyes, and in return Gentin was supported by the Amis du Rappel.

Gentin was Minister of Posts, Telegraphs, and Telephones from 18 January 1938 to 13 March 1938 in the 4th cabinet of Camille Chautemps. He was Minister of Health from 13 March 1938 to 10 April 1938 in the 2nd cabinet of Léon Blum. He was Minister of Commerce from 10 April 1938 to 20 March 1940 in the cabinet of Édouard Daladier. At the annual Radical Party congress in Marseille at the end of October 1938 Gentin proposed a modern economic plan with partial funding from the state. The plan was approved by the delegates, but two days later Paul Reynaud took office as Minister of Finance and rejected the plan.

With the economy still depressed, in the late 1930s there were popular demands for measures to prevent Jewish and other refugees from Nazi Germany from competing with native French people. On 17 June 1938 Gentin announced a decree that limited the right of foreigners to engage in commerce. The local chambers of commerce had to agree that a foreign-owned enterprise was "desirable", and could limit the number of foreigners who could work in some commercial occupations. With the growing threat of war in 1939, Gentin changed his position on refugees. He sponsored the 21 April 1939 "Decree to Favor the Establishment in France of Industries of National Interest", which had resulted from lobbying by Louise Weiss and the Bonnet Committee. This would remove constraints on foreign entrepreneurs and skilled technicians, particularly those who could assist in the war industry. He wrote, "we first of all want to make known the desire of France to facilitate the establishment on its soil of industries likely to increase in times of peace its power for expansion, and in times of war its capacity for resistance.

During World War II (1939–45), in October 1939 Gentin said that manufacturing for the military should not be allowed to affect production of luxury goods, since the profits from exports would offset the cost of war material imports. He said, "It is essential that we continue manufacturing export goods so that we hang on to our customers ... for when the war is over." This reflected a belief that France had strong defenses but a weak economy, the opposite of the view of the military leaders. Gentin visited London at the end of January 1940 and surprised his hosts by asking for removal of all obstacles to trade between Britain and France. This resulted in a broad agreement signed on 16 February 1940. Gentin repeated to a parliamentary committee in February 1940 that France should not give up manufacture of civilian products for export in response to an exaggerated demand for the manufacture of armaments.

== Vichy France and aftermath (1940–46) ==
After the defeat of France, on 10 July 1940 Gentin voted in favor of granting the constitutional powers requested by Marshal Philippe Pétain. Gentin was retained by the Vichy government as mayor of Isle-Aumont during the German occupation of France, and continued to run his printing house. He also administered and gave political direction to Le Petit Troyen. He submitted to German demands that he publish their communiqués, and that the paper follow their approved line. The paper was later described as "a clearly collaborationist organ, as much as any Paris daily". His motives may have been as much financial as ideological. It was said at his trial, "M. Gentin derived from his functions as political director substantial pecuniary advantages, and he also maneuvered as administrator to profit from the particular conditions created by the German occupation. This was how he increased his financial participation in the company's capital."

Due to his attitude during the occupation Gentin was arrested in December 1944 and tried by the Aube court of justice. On 24 January 1945 the court acquitted him of the charge of endangering the security of the state, but condemned him to ten years of national degradation for collaboration. On 10 July 1945, due to the previous court decision and on the basis that he was administrator and political director of a newspaper that put itself at the service of the enemy, a Jury of Honor confirmed his ineligibility for public office caused by his vote on 10 July 1940.

Fernand Gentin died on 24 April 1946 in Paris.

== Publications ==
- Fernand Gentin (1939). preface. Manuel pratique du commerce extérieur de la France pendant les hostilités. By Durand, Julien (in French). Paris: Comité national des conseillers du commerce extérieur de la France. p. 173.
- Fernand Gentin (1943). preface. Cours pratique de commerce. By Veyrenc, Albert (in French) (8 ed.). Paris: Malakoff, Seine, impr. de G. Durassié. p. 216.

== Sources ==
- Alexander, Martin S. (1999-01-01). "Le général Maurice Gamelin". Militaires en République: les officiers, le pouvoir et la vie publique en France (in French). Publications de la Sorbonne. ISBN 978-2-85944-362-7.
- Blatt, Joel (1997-08-15). The French Defeat of 1940: Reassessments. Berghahn Books. ISBN 978-0-85745-717-2.
- Caron, Vicki (1999). Uneasy Asylum: France and the Jewish Refugee Crisis, 1933-1942. Stanford University Press. ISBN 978-0-8047-4377-8.
- collectif (2001). "Gentin (Fernand)". Dictionnaire des parlementaires français de 1940 à 1958 (in French). Vol. 4. E-K. Paris: La Documentation française.
- Dockrill, Michael L.; McKercher, Brian J. C. (2002-07-25). Diplomacy and World Power: Studies in British Foreign Policy, 1890-1951. Cambridge University Press. ISBN 978-0-521-52934-1.
- Jolly, Jean (1960–1977). "Gentin (Fernand)". Dictionnaire des parlementaires français; notices biographiques sur les ministres, députés et sénateurs français de 1889 à 1940 (in French). Paris: Presses universitaires de France. ISBN 2-1100-1998-0.
- "Fernand GENTIN – Mandats" (in French). Assemblée nationale.
- Larmour, Peter J. (1964). The French Radical Party in the 1930s. Stanford University Press. ISBN 978-0-8047-0206-5.
- Piketty, Guillaume (1998-01-01). Pierre Brossolette: Un héros de la Résistance. Odile Jacob. ISBN 978-2-7381-0539-4.
- Wieviorka, Olivier (2009). Orphans of the Republic: The Nation's Legislators in Vichy France. Harvard University Press. ISBN 978-0-674-03261-3.
