= Philippe Mestre =

French civil servant, media executive and politician

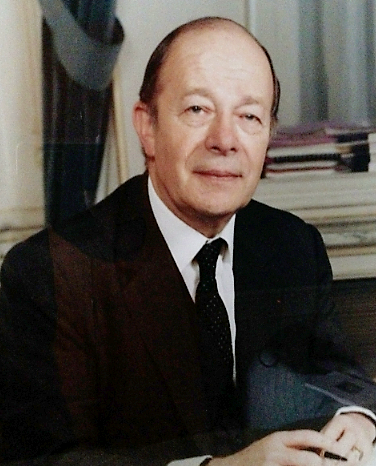

Minister of Veterans Affairs
- In office 29 March 1993 – 18 May 1995
- President: François Mitterrand
- Prime Minister: Édouard Balladur
- Preceded by: Louis Mexandeau
- Succeeded by: Pierre Pasquini

Member of the National Assembly
- In office 6 June 1988 – 1 May 1993
- Succeeded by: Léon Aimé
- Constituency: Vendée 2
- In office 2 July 1981 – 14 May 1988
- Constituency: Vendée

Personal details
- Born: 23 August 1927 Talmont-Saint-Hilaire, Vendée, France
- Died: 25 April 2017 (aged 89) Paris, France
- Party: UDF
- Occupation: Prefect

Philippe Mestre (French: [filip mɛstʁ]; 23 August 1927 – 25 April 2017) was a French high-ranking civil servant, media executive and politician. He was the prefect of Gers, Lower Normandy, Calvados, Pays de la Loire and Loire-Atlantique. He was the chief executive of Presse-Océan from 1981 to 1993. He served as a member of the National Assembly from 1981 to 1993, representing Vendée. He was the Minister of Veteran Affairs and War Victims from 1993 to 1995. He was a commander of the Legion of Honour and an officer of the National Order of Merit.
