= Uhart-Cize =

Uhart-Cize Uharte-Garazi (Basque)
- Commune
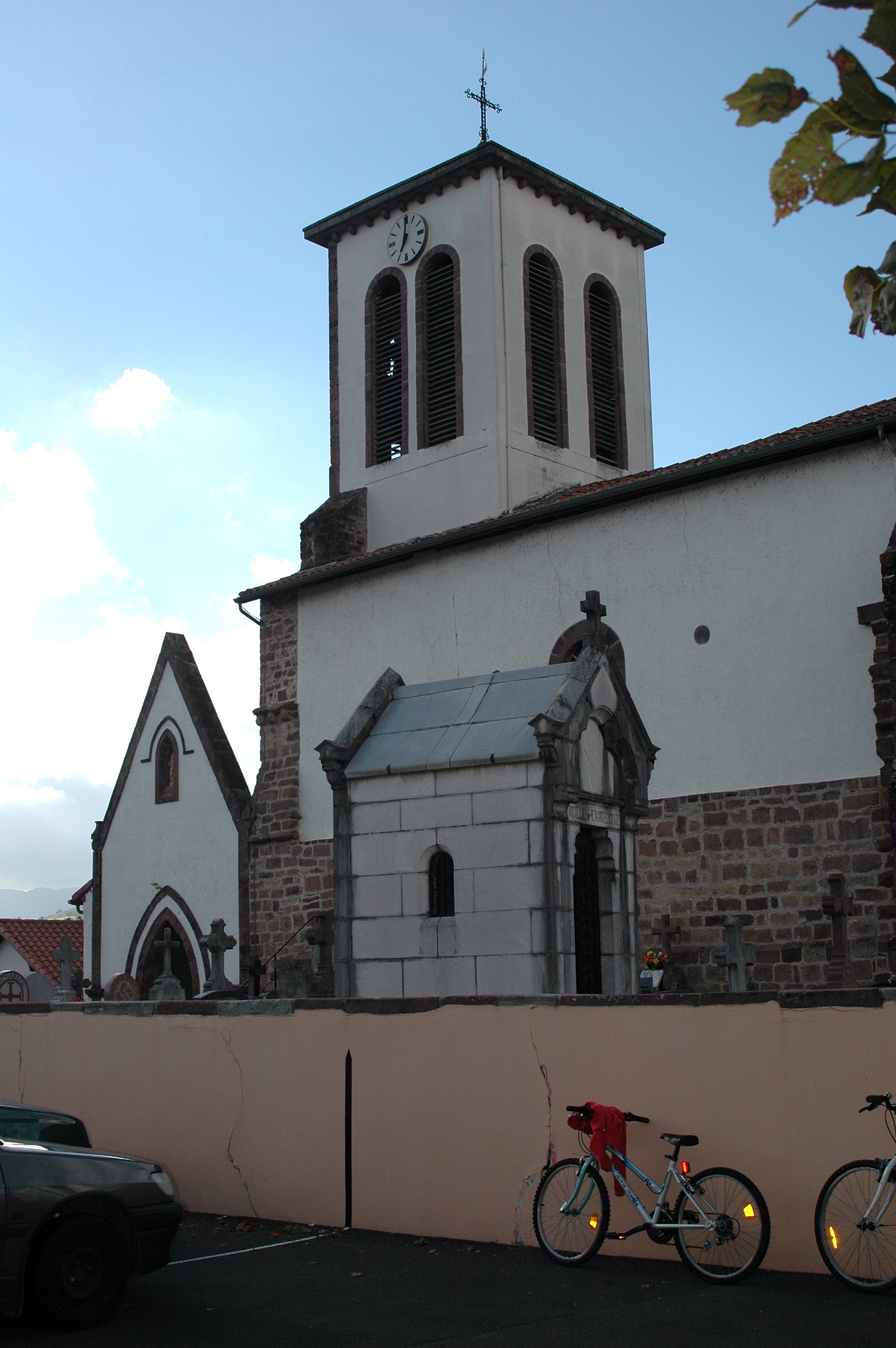
- Notre-Dame de l'Assomption church

- Coat of arms
- Location of Uhart-Cize
- Location within France Location within Nouvelle-Aquitaine
- Coordinates: 43°09′56″N 1°14′36″W
- Country: France
- Region: Nouvelle-Aquitaine
- Department: Pyrénées-Atlantiques
- Arrondissement: Bayonne
- Canton: Montagne Basque
- Intercommunality: CA Pays Basque

Government
  - Mayor (2020–2026): Claire Dutaret-Bordagaray
- Area^{1}: 11.66 km^{2} (4.50 sq mi)
- Elevation: 157 m (515 ft)
- Highest elevation: 1,064 m (3,491 ft)
- Lowest elevation: 149 m (489 ft)
- Population (2023): 816
  - Density: 70.0/km^{2} (181/sq mi)
- Time zone: UTC+01:00 (CET)
  - Summer (DST): UTC+02:00 (CEST)
- INSEE/Postal code: 64538 /64220
- ^{1} French Land Register data, which excludes lakes, ponds, glaciers > 1 km^{2} (0.386 sq mi or 247 acres) and river estuaries.

Uhart-Cize (French pronunciation: [yaʁt siz]; Basque: Uharte-Garazi) is a commune in the Pyrénées-Atlantiques department in south-western France.

It is located in the former province of Lower Navarre.

== See also ==
- Communes of the Pyrénées-Atlantiques department
