= René Besse =

French politician (1891–1947)

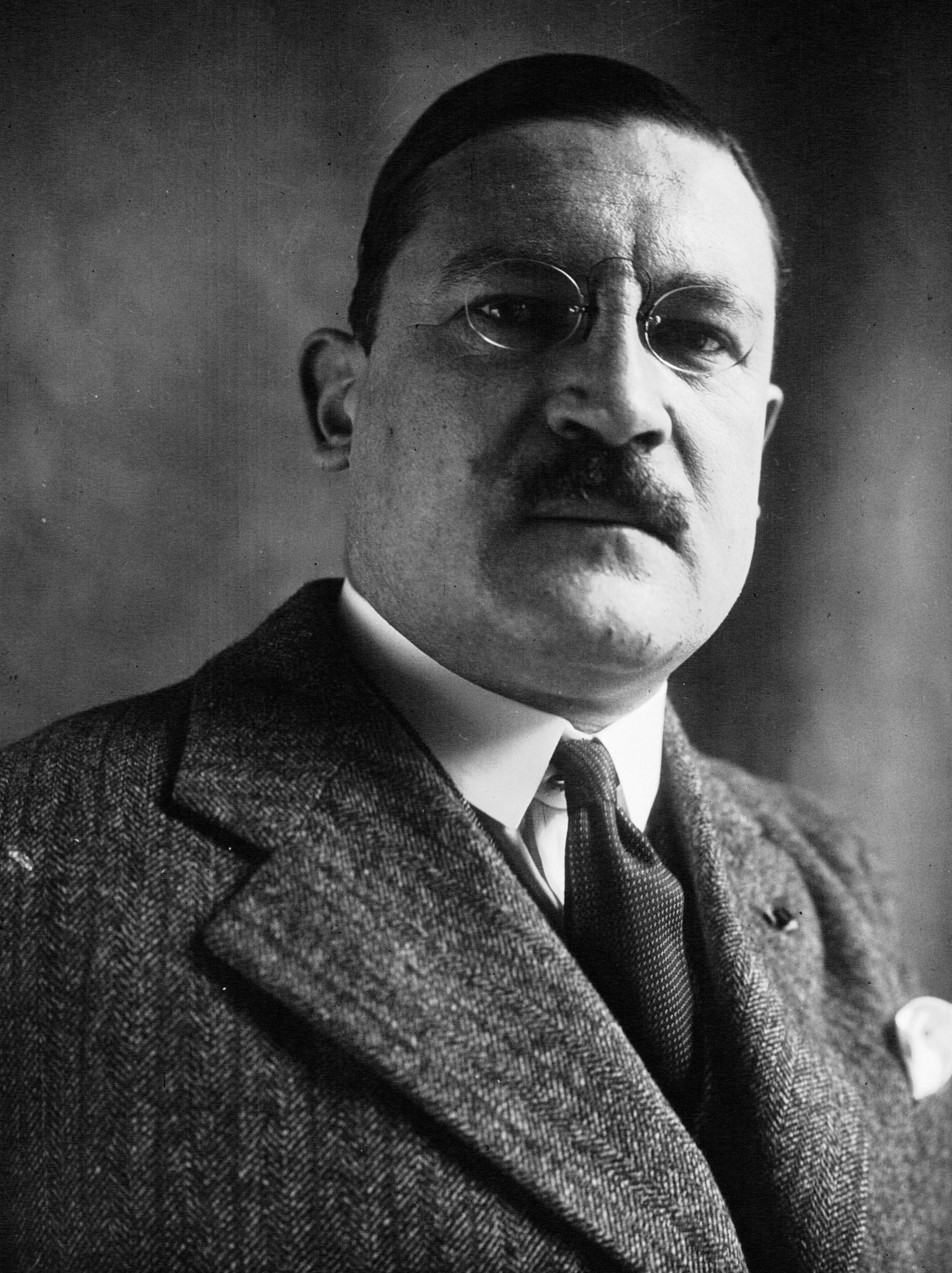

French parliamentarian
- In office 1932–1942
- Constituency: Lot

Personal details
- Born: 20 February 1891
- Died: 13 February 1947 (aged 55)
- Party: Democratic Alliance
- Other party: IG group 1932-1936; Non-inscrits 1936-1942

René Besse (French pronunciation: [ʁəne bɛs]; 20 February 1891 in Toulon, Var – 13 February 1947) was a French politician.

Besse was Minister of Pensions for a few months in the second government of Albert Sarraut (1936) and Minister of Veterans and Pensioners from 18 September 1938 to 21 March 1940 in the third government of Édouard Daladier.
