= André Bord =

French politician

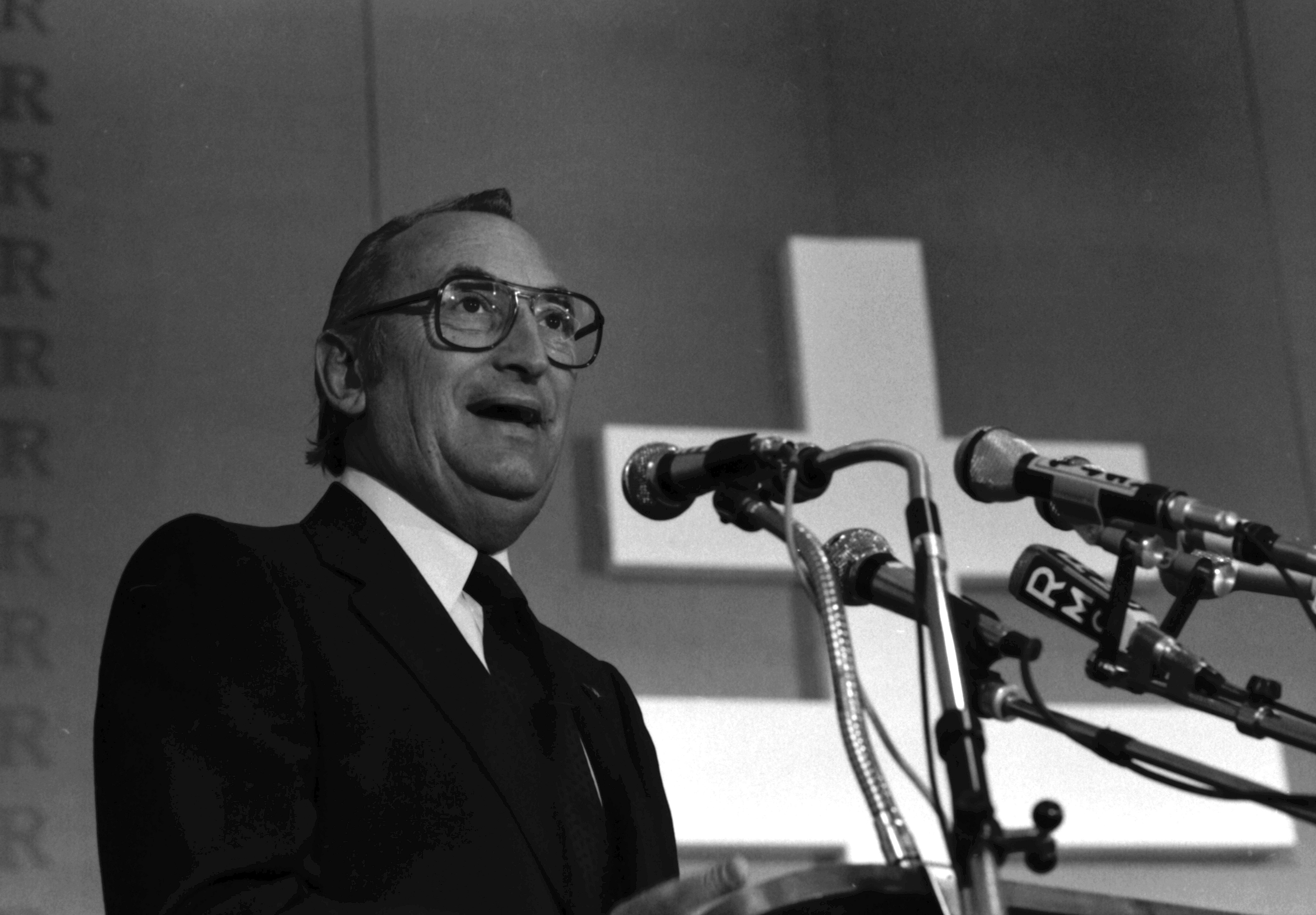
- Bord in September 1980
- Born: 30 November 1922; Strasbourg, France
- Died: 13 May 2013 (aged 90); Holtzheim, France

André Bord (30 November 1922 – 13 May 2013) was a French politician. He served as the national Minister of Veteran Affairs from 1972 to 1974 and the President of the Alsace Regional Council from 1973 to 1977.

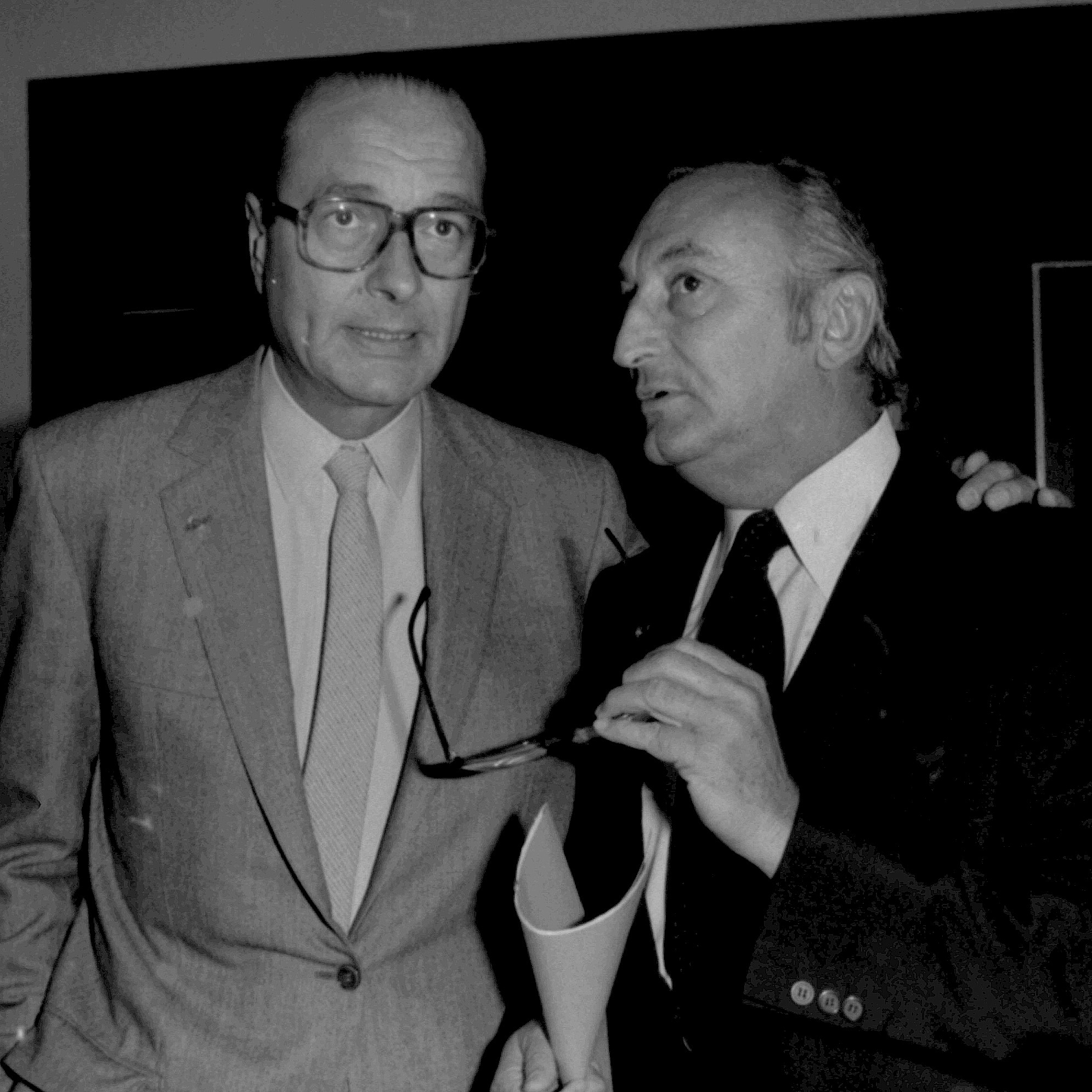
Jacques Chirac and André Bord in 1980
