= César Campinchi =

French statesman

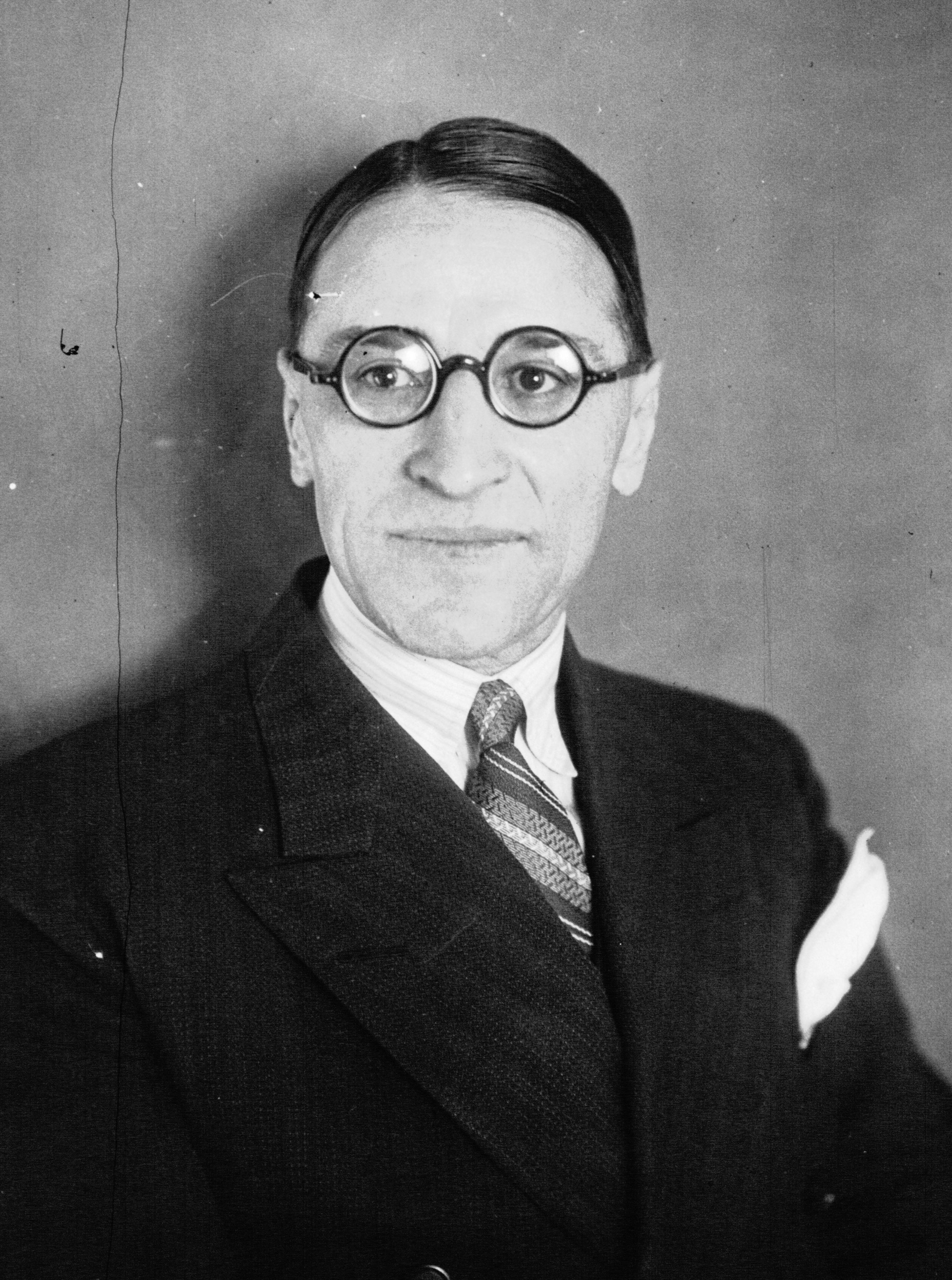
César Campinchi-1932

César Campinchi (May 4, 1882 in Calcatoggio, Corse-du-Sud – February 22, 1941 in Marseille, Bouches-du-Rhône) was a lawyer and French statesman in the beginning of the 20th century.

Campinchi was president of the Association générale des étudiants de Paris student organisation, a member of the Radical Socialist Party and deputy for Corsica from 1932 to 1940. He carried out the functions of the Keeper of the seals and presented the Campinchi proposal concerning the protection of minors in 1937.

In his history of The Second World War, Volume 1, The Gathering Storm, Winston Churchill says on page 449:

”I formed a high opinion of this man (Campinchi). His patriotism, his ardour, his acute intelligence and above all, his resolve to conquer or die, hit home. (Admiral) Pound and I got on very well with Campinchi. This tough Corsican never flinched or failed.”

He married Hélène, who was the daughter of Adolphe Landry and also a lawyer. Given her brief by François de Menthon, Hélène chaired the commission which oversaw the drafting of the 2 February 1945 relating to delinquent children, which also established her husband's proposal.

Gaston Monnerville was one of Campinchi's close colleagues.

== Roles in government ==
- Ministre de la Marine 22 June 1937 – 18 January 1938, in the 3rd government of Camille Chautemps,
- Ministre de la Justice 18 January 1938 – 13 March 1938, in the 4th government of Chautemps,
- Ministre de la Marine militaire 13 March 1938 – 16 June 1940, in the 2nd government of Léon Blum, the 3rd government of Édouard Daladier and the government of Paul Reynaud.

== Quote ==
"When one is a whore or a minister, one has the right to that title for the rest of one's life."
