= Jean-Baptiste Lebas =

French politician (1878–1944)

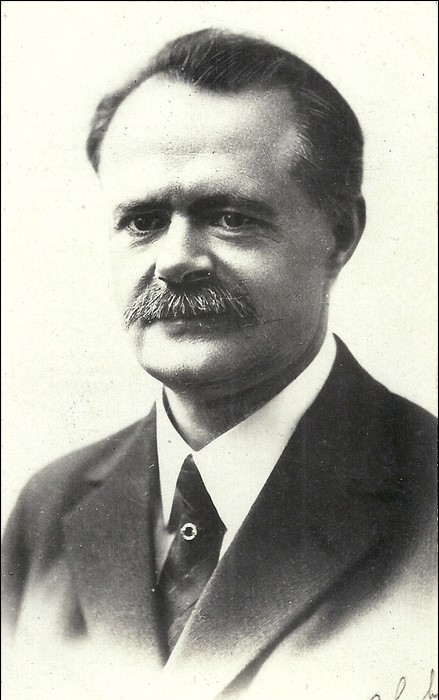

Member of the National Assembly
- In office 16 November 1919 - 31 May 1924; 11 May 1924 - 31 May 1928; 1 May 1932 - 31 May 1936; 3 May 1936 - 31 May 1942
- Deputy: Nord

Minister of Labour
- In office 4 June 1936 – 21 June 1937
- Prime Minister: Léon Blum
- Preceded by: Ludovic-Oscar Frossard
- Succeeded by: André Février

Minister of Posts, Telegraphs, and Telephones
- In office 29 June 1937 - 18 January 1938; 13 March 1938 - 10 April 1938
- Prime Minister: Camille Chautemps; Léon Blum
- Preceded by: Robert Jardillier; Fernand Gentin
- Succeeded by: Fernand Gentin; Alfred Jules-Julien

Mayor of Roubaix
- In office 19 May 1912 - 7 March 1915; 21 October 1918 - June 1940
- Preceded by: Eugène Motte; Henri Thérin
- Succeeded by: Henri Thérin; Fleuris Vanherpe

Personal details
- Born: Jean-Baptiste Lebas; 24 October 1878 Roubaix, France
- Died: March 10, 1944 (aged 65) Sonnenburg, Reichsgau Danzig-West Prussia
- Resting place: Cemetery of Roubaix
- Party: Socialist (SFIO)
- Spouse: Angèle Hennion
- Profession: Accountant
- Nickname: Jean Lebas

Jean-Baptiste Lebas (French: [ʒɑ̃ batist ləba]; 24 October 1878 – 10 March 1944) was a French Socialist politician, deputy to the National Assembly of France during the Third Republic, who served twice as minister under Léon Blum’s governments. He was mayor of Roubaix and member of the Resistance during World War II.

== First step in politics ==
Jean-Baptiste Lebas is the son of Félicité Delattre and Jean-Hippolyte Lebas. He was born at home in a humble house in Roubaix, an industrial city where his mother was a housekeeper and his father a textile worker. A Republican under the Second Empire and a syndicalist, Jean-Baptiste Lebas's father was a socialist who had become member of the Parti Ouvrier Français (POF) at its foundation in 1880. Altogether, it was observable that Jean-Baptiste Lebas had been brought up in a working class family and steeped in a left-wing milieu in his birth town.

In 1896, following his father at the age of eighteen, he joined the POF. In 1900 he wrote under the pen name Jacques Vingtras a brochure premised by Jules Guesde and entitled: Socialisme et patriotisme. He entered a career as accountant for the cooperative society La Paix in 1901. In 1906 he became assistant secretary for the local branch of the SFIO.

== Mayor of Roubaix ==
In 1908 Lebas was elected to the municipal council of Roubaix. Then he came to be the mayor of the city in 1912.

German troops invaded the city of Roubaix at the beginning of World War I. Lebas refused to grant the German forces the list of inhabitants in the prime of life whom occupiers wanted for compulsory labour. Therefore, he was arrested on 7 March 1915 and imprisoned in the fortress of Rastatt. After he was released, he has been awarded the Legion of Honour in October 1916 for his courage.

Between the two world wars, Lebas developed and implemented a social policy for his city aimed at constructing decent and salubrious housing and providing access to education.

== Deputy and minister of the Popular Front government ==
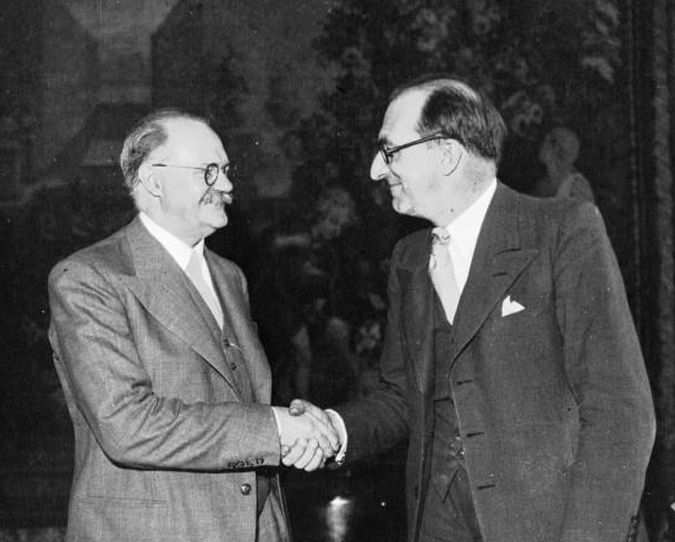
Handover of power between Robert Jardillier and his successor Jean-Baptiste Lebas at Ministry of PTT, 1937

Lebas was elected deputy for the first time in 1919 alongside Jules Guesde. Afterwards, he was re-elected in 1924, 1932 and 1936.

In 1936 he rejoined the first Blum's government as Minister of Labour. Following the Matignon Agreements he introduced a law that granted the first annual leave of two weeks for workers and employees as well as a forty-hour work week.

== Resistance ==
For some undeclared reason, Lebas did not take part to the vote on the constitutional change that established an authoritarian regime under the government of Marshal Philippe Pétain.

On 21 May 1941, as a member of a resistance movement he was arrested together with his son and his niece by the Gestapo and imprisoned in France before being deported to Germany. He died at the Sonnenburg concentration camp in 1944.

After liberation, a large monument was erected by the municipal council to honour one of its most famous mayors in 1949. On 31 August 1951, his body was repatriated to France alongside that of his son and those of six other Roubaisians who died in concentration camps.

== See also ==
- Popular Front
- Matignon Agreements (1936)
- History of the Left in France
