= Évergnicourt =

- Commune
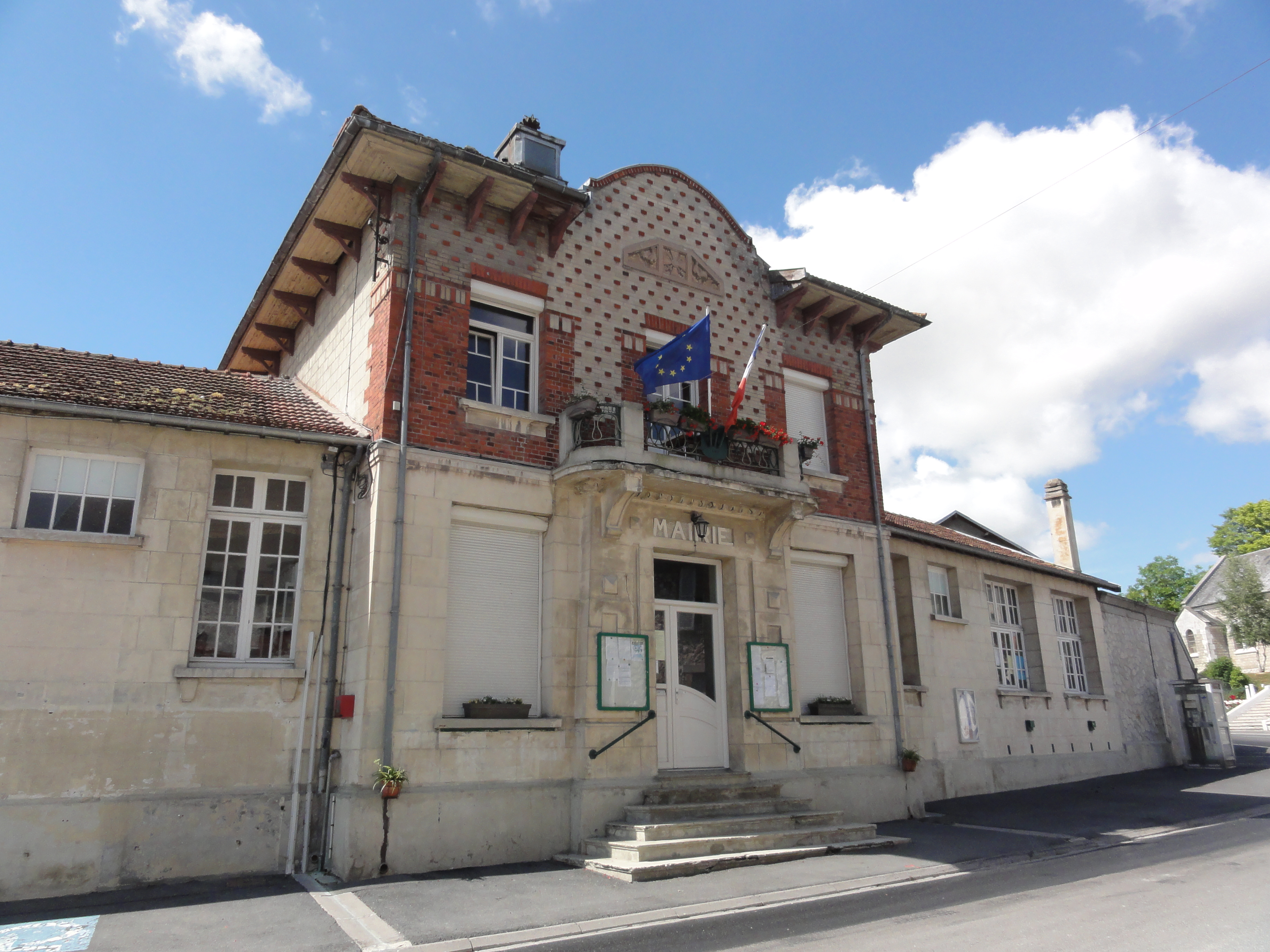
- The town hall of Évergnicourt

- Coat of arms
- Location of Évergnicourt
- Location within France Location within Hauts-de-France
- Coordinates: 49°26′39″N 4°02′32″E
- Country: France
- Region: Hauts-de-France
- Department: Aisne
- Arrondissement: Laon
- Canton: Villeneuve-sur-Aisne
- Intercommunality: Champagne Picarde

Government
  - Mayor (2026–32): Olivier Cavel
- Area^{1}: 9.15 km^{2} (3.53 sq mi)
- Elevation: 55 m (180 ft)
- Highest elevation: 125 m (410 ft)
- Lowest elevation: 56 m (184 ft)
- Population (2023): 522
  - Density: 57.0/km^{2} (148/sq mi)
- Time zone: UTC+01:00 (CET)
  - Summer (DST): UTC+02:00 (CEST)
- INSEE/Postal code: 02299 /02190
- ^{1} French Land Register data, which excludes lakes, ponds, glaciers > 1 km^{2} (0.386 sq mi or 247 acres) and river estuaries.

Évergnicourt (French pronunciation: [evɛʁɲikuʁ]) is a commune in the Aisne department in Hauts-de-France in northern France.

== Population ==
Historical population
Year	Pop.	±% p.a.
1968	562	—
1975	542	−0.52%
1982	541	−0.03%
1990	548	+0.16%
1999	549	+0.02%
2007	539	−0.23%
2012	581	+1.51%
2017	570	−0.38%
2023	522	−1.46%
Source: INSEE

== See also ==
- Communes of the Aisne department
