= Auguste Champetier de Ribes =

French politician and jurist (1882–1947)

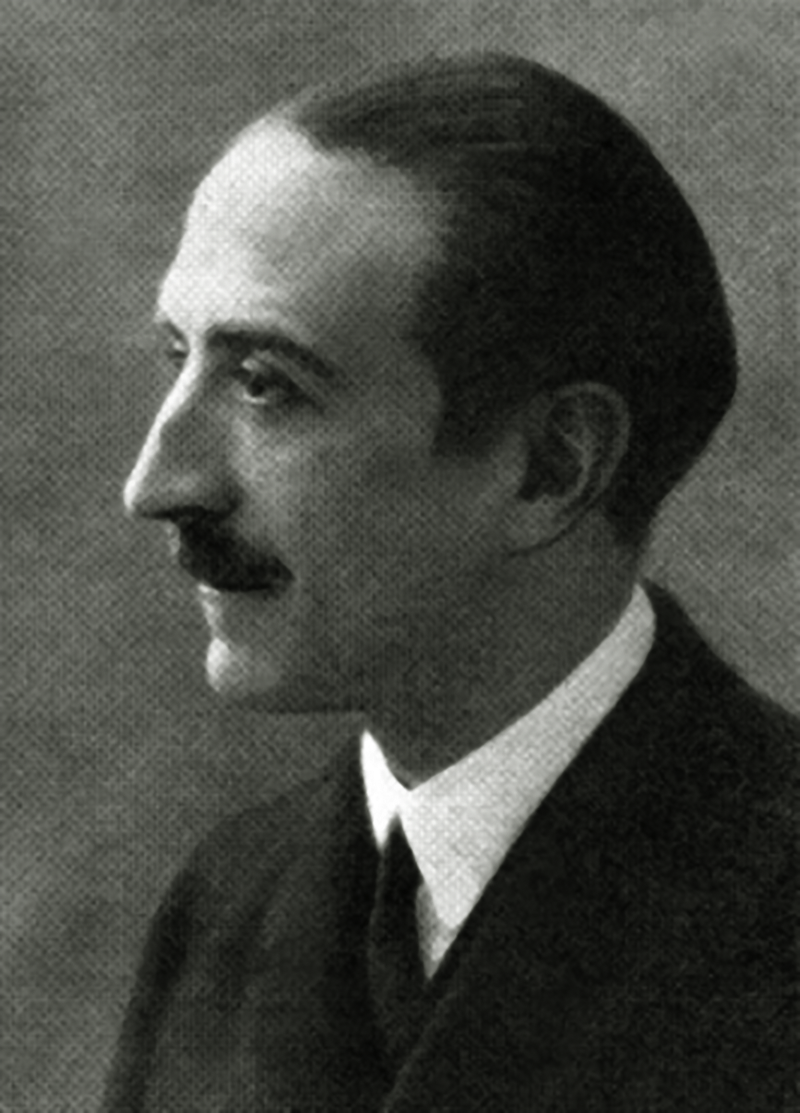
- Champetier de Ribes in 1930

President of the Council of Republic
- In office 27 December 1946 – 6 March 1947
- Succeeded by: Gaston Monnerville

Personal details
- Born: 30 July 1882 Antony, Hauts-de-Seine, France
- Died: 6 March 1947 (aged 64) Paris, France

Auguste Champetier de Ribes (French pronunciation: [oɡyst ʃɑ̃ptje də ʁib]; 30 July 1882 – 6 March 1947) was a French politician and jurist.

A devout Catholic, he was an early follower of Albert de Mun and social Christianity. Wounded in the First World War, he was elected to the Chamber of Deputies from the Basses-Pyrénées as a Christian Democrat (PDP) from 1924 to 1934. He was Senator from 1934 to 1940. He served as a junior minister or minister in various governments led by André Tardieu, Édouard Daladier, Paul Reynaud, and Pierre Laval.

In 1940, he was among the 80 parliamentarians who refused to give Pétain full powers (see The Vichy 80) and served in the Combat resistance movement. An early supporter of Charles de Gaulle, he was named by the Provisional Government of the French Republic as the French representative during the Nuremberg Trials, during which he delivered the closing statement from the French Prosecution. Upon his return, he was elected President of the Council of the Republic (now known as the French Senate) by the benefit of age. He had tied Communist Georges Marrane, but was elected because he was older than Marrane. Two days later, he was the defeated MRP candidate in the 1947 French presidential election. His health prevented him from assuming his role as President of the Council and he died in office.

Political offices
Formation of the Fourth Republic	President of the Council of the Republic; 1946–1947	Succeeded by Gaston Monnerville
