= Albert Dalimier =

French politician

Albert François Marie Dalimier
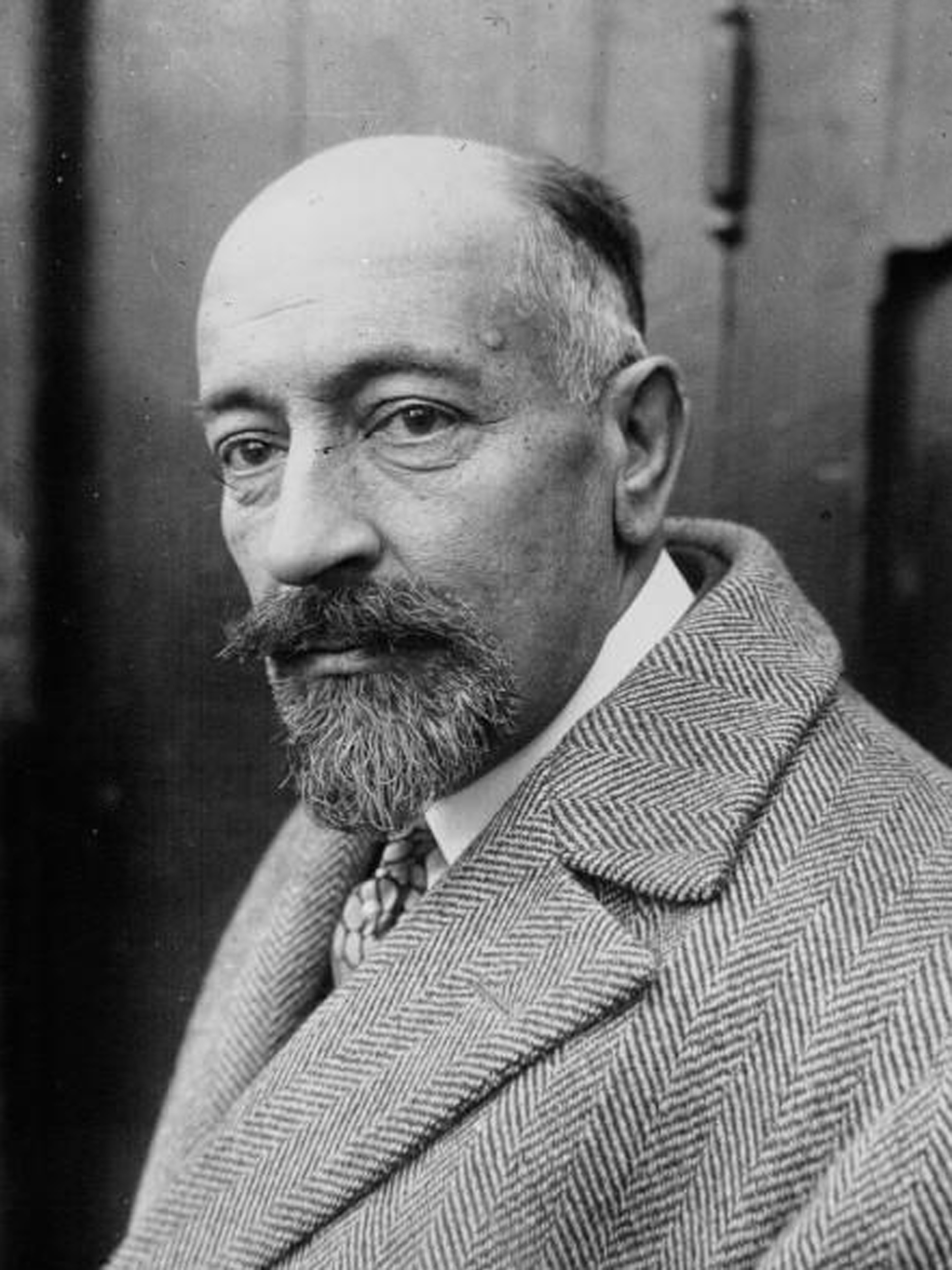
- Dalimier in 1928

Minister of Labor
- In office 3 June 1932 – 30 January 1933
- Prime Minister: Édouard Herriot; Joseph Paul-Boncour
- Preceded by: Pierre Laval
- Succeeded by: François Albert

Minister of the Colonies
- In office 7 September 1933 – 25 October 1933
- Prime Minister: Édouard Daladier
- Preceded by: Albert Sarraut
- Succeeded by: François Piétri

Minister of Justice
- In office 26 October 1933 – 25 November 1933
- Prime Minister: Albert Sarraut
- Preceded by: Eugène Penancier
- Succeeded by: Eugène Raynaldy

Minister of the Colonies
- In office 26 November 1933 – 8 January 1934
- Prime Minister: Camille Chautemps
- Preceded by: François Piétri
- Succeeded by: Lucien Lamoureux

Personal details
- Born: 20 February 1875 Bordeaux, Gironde, France
- Died: 6 May 1936 (aged 61) Neuilly-sur-Seine, Seine, France
- Party: Radical

Albert François Marie Dalimier (French pronunciation: [albɛʁ fʁɑ̃swa maʁi dalimje]; 20 February 1875 – 6 May 1936) was a French politician. Between 1932 and 1934 he was Minister of Labor, Minister of the Colonies (twice) and Minister of Justice in four of the short-lived cabinets of that period. He was forced to resign during the scandal of the Stavisky Affair in January 1934, since his advice as Minister of Labor may have made the embezzlement possible.

== Early years ==
Albert François Marie Dalimier was born on 20 February 1875 in Bordeaux, Gironde. He attended secondary schools in Marseille and Vanves, then attended the Lycée Buffon in Paris, where his father was headmaster. He qualified as a lawyer in 1896 and became secretary to Léon Mougeot, who served in various cabinets between 1898 and 1905. As an attorney he accepted both civil and criminal cases, and soon became well known. He was elected to the general council of Seine-et-Oise, and held this position for the rest of his career.

== National politics ==
In 1906 Dalimier ran successfully for election to the legislature for the first constituency of Corbeil in Seine-et-Oise, and was reelected in 1910 and 1914. He sat with the Radical Republicans and Radical Socialists. On 14 June 1914 he joined the cabinet of René Viviani as under-secretary of state for Fine Arts, and retained this position in subsequent cabinets until 16 November 1917. He did not stand in the 1919 elections, but returned to his legal career. He won the election of May 1924 in the second round, and was reelected in 1928 and 1932. Dalimier was in favor of disarmament, the League of Nations and the progressive income tax. He spoke well, but introduced only three bills during twenty one years in the legislature.

Dalimier was Minister of Labor from 3 June 1932 to 31 January 1933 in the cabinet of Édouard Herriot and the succeeding cabinet of Joseph Paul-Boncour. On 6 September 1933 Dalimier succeeded Albert Sarraut as Minister of the Colonies in the cabinet of Édouard Daladier. When that cabinet fell, he became Minister of Justice and vice president of the council on 26 October 1933 in the cabinet of Albert Sarraut. The Sarraut cabinet fell after a month, and on 26 November 1933 he was again made Minister of the Colonies in the cabinet of Camille Chautemps.

== Stavisky scandal ==
While Minister of Labor, in June 1932 Dalimier was asked by the Radical deputy Joseph Garat, president of the Bayonne crédit municipal, to remind private insurance companies that they could invest in crédit municipal bonds. The municipal caisses de crédit acted as pawn shops and provided other banking services. On 25 June 1932 Dalimier wrote to the president of the General Board of Insurance Companies that reminded him what good value the bonds provided, and saying investment in these bonds was a matter of public interest.

The Ministry of Labor approved the operations of social insurance funds, which took contributions from workers and employers to insure against accidents and loss of work and to provide pensions. The state deposit bank was also involved in regulating the funds. At the request of the financier Alexandre Stavisky, in September 1932 Albert Dubarry, editor of the Radical daily paper La Volonté, asked Dalimier to let social insurance funds also invest in the bonds of crédits municipaux. Dalimier's ministry did not have authority to tell the funds how to invest, but he signed a letter to Dubarry saying he was sure that the funds, particularly in the Bayonne region, would be glad to invest in the crédits municipaux bonds. Dubarry passed the letter on to Stavisky.

In December 1933 it was found that the bonds of the Crédit Municipale de Bayonne were worthless. Stavisky disappeared. The newspapers led a public outcry over the Stavisky Affair. On 3 January 1934 L'Action Française published two letters Dalimier had written in 1932 recommending the purchase of the Bayonne Municipal Pawnshop bonds. Apparently he had deliberately endorsed a fraud. It soon emerged that Stavisky had been charged with fraud in 1927 and his trial had been repeatedly delayed. The public prosecutor, brother-in-law of the prime minister Camille Chautemps, seemed to be involved. Stavisky was found dead in a villa near Chamonix on 8 January 1934.

Dalimier resigned from the ministry on 9 January 1934. He was expelled from the Radical party on 13 March 1934. He did not run for reelection in 1936, and died at the age of 61 on 6 May 1936 in Neuilly-sur-Seine, Seine.

== Publications ==
- Albert Dalimier (1916). preface. Les Artistes morts pour la patrie (août 1914-décembre 1915). By Ginisty, Paul (in French). introductions by Léon Bonnat, Bartholomé, Widor, Pascal and Mme Bartet. Paris: F. Alcan. pp. 171.
- Albert Dalimier (1917). preface. Au frisson des drapeaux, poèmes de guerre. By Redelsperger, Jacques (in French) (5 ed.). Paris: ligue Souvenez-vous. p. 348.
- Albert Dalimier (1932). preface. Le Chômage en France. Étude de législation sociale. By Héreil, Georges (in French). Paris: Libr. du "Recueil Sirey". p. 211.
- Albert Dalimier (1933). preface. Chômage. By Guitard, Paul. Les Problèmes contemporains (in French). Paris: Maurice d'Hartoy; Suresnes : Impr. Imprimor. p. 205.

== Sources ==
- Jankowski, Paul (2002). Stavisky: A Confidence Man in the Republic of Virtue. Cornell University Press. ISBN 0-8014-3959-0.
- Jolly, Jean (1960–1977). "DALIMIER (Albert, François, Marie)". Dictionnaire des parlementaires français (1889–1940). Paris: Presses universitaires de France. ISBN 2-1100-1998-0.
- Martin, Benjamin F. (1 March 1999). The Hypocrisy of Justice in the Belle Epoque. LSU Press. ISBN 978-0-8071-5379-6.
- Phillips, Cabell B. H.; Mitgang, Herbert (1969). From the Crash to the Blitz, 1929-1939. Fordham Univ Press. ISBN 978-0-8232-2000-7.
