= Paul Jourdain =

French industrialist and politician

Paul Léon Jourdain
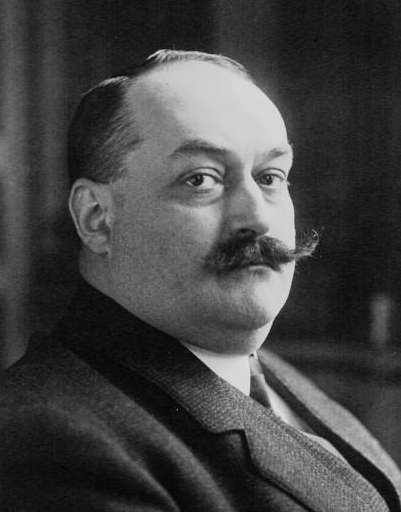
- Jourdain in 1919

Minister of Labor
- In office 2 December 1919 – 16 January 1921
- Prime Minister: Georges Clemenceau; Alexandre Millerand; Georges Leygues
- Preceded by: Pierre Colliard
- Succeeded by: Charles Daniel-Vincent

Minister of Labor
- In office 9 June 1924 – 14 June 1924
- Prime Minister: Édouard Herriot
- Preceded by: Charles Daniel-Vincent
- Succeeded by: Justin Godart

Minister of Pensions
- In office 28 November 1925 – 19 July 1926
- Prime Minister: Aristide Briand
- Preceded by: Louis Antériou
- Succeeded by: Georges Bonnet

Personal details
- Born: 28 October 1878 Altkirch, Alsace-Lorraine, German Empire
- Died: 26 March 1948 (aged 69) Paris, France
- Education: Emlyon Business School
- Occupation: Industrialist

Paul Léon Jourdain (French pronunciation: [pɔl leɔ̃ ʒuʁdɛ̃]; 28 October 1878 – 26 March 1948) was a French industrialist and politician who was a deputy from 1919 to 1927 and a senator from 1927 to 1944. He was Minister of Labor in 1919–21 and for a brief period in 1924. He was Minister of Pensions from 1925–26.

== Early years ==
Paul Léon Jourdain was born on 28 October 1878 in Altkirch, Alsace-Lorraine, then part of the German Empire. He attended the Lycée Jansonde-Sailly for his secondary education, then joined the 119th infantry regiment in Le Havre for his military service. (Note: Alsace was part of Germany between the Franco-Prussian War of 1870 and the end of World War II (1914–18), so technically Jourdain was a German citizen and did not have to undertake French military service.) He attended the École Supérieure de Commerce in Lyon, from which he graduated in 1902. He worked for a machinery firm in Bourgoin, then worked in the silk industry in Lyon. When his elder brother died in 1911 he returned to Altkirch to take over management of the family business, the Établissements Filature et Tissage X. Jourdain (X. Jordan Spinning and Weaving establishments), which had been founded in 1827 by his grandfather, Xavier Jourdain.

At the start of World War I (1914–18) Jourdain tried to reach France but was arrested by the German military authorities on 4 August 1914. On 7 August 1914 he was released by French troops. Soon after he was assigned assistant military attache to the French embassy in Bern. On 14 November 1918 he was named military administrator of the Altkirch and Dannemarie territories.

== National Politics ==
On 16 November 1919 Jourdain was elected deputy for Haut-Rhin. He was made the president of the chamber's Commission d'Assurance et de Prévoyance Sociales. He was appointed Minister of Labor on 2 December 1919 in the cabinet of Georges Clemenceau, and retained this post in the subsequent cabinets of Alexandre Millerand and Georges Leygues, leaving office on 16 January 1921. In 1920 Jourdain became mayor of Altkirch, holding office throughout the inter-war years. General strikes broke out across France in May 1920. Jourdain tried to mediate a solution, while Millerand imposed repressive measures.

Jourdain was the principal author of the first French social insurance bill, which was presented to the chamber by his successor as Minister of Labor, Charles Daniel-Vincent. The bill was controversial and was not passed, but established the basis for future bills of a similar nature. It included insurance for illness, maternity, death, disability and old age, and applied to all workers in commerce, industry and agriculture.

Jourdain was reelected to the chamber of deputies on 11 May 1924. He was Minister of Labor in the short-lived cabinet of Frédéric François-Marsal from 9–14 June 1924. He was Minister of Pensions in the three successive cabinets of Aristide Briand from 28 November 1925 to 19 July 1926. These cabinets, which tried without success to solve the financial crisis, included members with a range of political views. Georges Mandel said of Jourdain and Leygues that they "had adopted such contradictory policies that they could not be said to represent any."

On 9 January 1927 Jourdain was elected to the Senate and joined the Democratic and Radical Union. He was reelected in the second round on 20 October 1935. He was appointed vice president of the Senate on 11 January 1940. On 10 July 1940 he voted in favor of the constitutional law that gave full powers to Marshal Philippe Pétain. He died in Paris on 26 March 1948 at the age of 69.

== Publications ==
- Jourdain, Paul (1920), Rapport sur l'application pendant les années 1917 et 1918 de la loi des retraites ouvrières et paysannes (in French), Paris : Impr. nationale, p. 240
- Jourdain, Paul (1923-06-26), "L'Union républicaine. Die republikanische Einhalt", La France de l'Est, Mülhauser Tagblatt (in French and German), Mulhouse: impr. J. Brinkmann: 16
- Jourdain, Paul (1924), Les problèmes politiques (in French), Mulhouse: impr. J. Brinkmann, p. 35
- Paul Jourdain (1936), preface, A la recherche de l'équilibre perdu. S'organiser ou disparaître., by Gaulon, Roger-Jean (in French) (2 ed.), Paris: impr. E. Ramlot, p. 285
- Paul Jourdain (1937), preface, Le Crédit agricole en Égypte, by Zannis, Joseph (in French), Paris: Librairie technique et économique, p. 181
- Paul Jourdain (1938), foreword, Le Bilan du commerce extérieur de la France en 1937 et ses enseignements, conférence faite à l'assemblée générale de la section du Nord, le 11 février 1938, by Durand, Julien (in French), Avesnes-sur Helpe: Editions de "L'Observateur", p. 34

== Sources ==
- Collectif (2005). "JOURDAIN (Paul)". Dictionnaire des parlementaires français de 1940 à 1958 (in French). Paris: La Documentation française.
- Dutton, Paul V. (2002-05-16), Origins of the French Welfare State: The Struggle for Social Reform in France, 1914–1947, Cambridge University Press, ISBN 978-1-139-43296-2
- Jolly, Jean (1960–1977). "JOURDAIN (Paul, Léon)". Dictionnaire des parlementaires français; notices biographiques sur les ministres, députés et sénateurs français de 1889 à 1940 (in French). Paris: Presses universitaires de France. ISBN 2-1100-1998-0.
- Sherwood, John M. (1970-01-01), Georges Mandel and the Third Republic, Stanford University Press, ISBN 978-0-8047-0731-2
