= Charles Daniel-Vincent =

French politician (1874–1946)

Charles Augustin Daniel Vincent
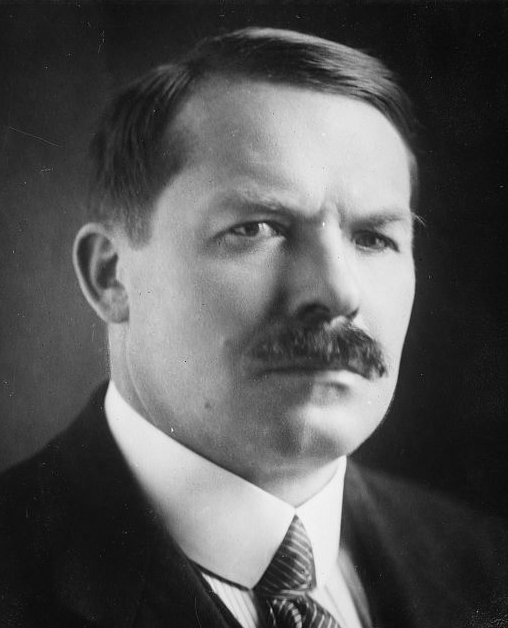

Minister of Education and Fine Arts
- In office 12 September 1917 – 16 November 1917
- Prime Minister: Paul Painlevé
- Preceded by: Théodore Steeg
- Succeeded by: Louis Lafferre

Minister of Labor and Social Assurance
- In office 16 January 1921 – 15 January 1922
- Prime Minister: Aristide Briand
- Preceded by: Paul Jourdain
- Succeeded by: Albert Peyronnet

Minister of Labor and Hygiene
- In office 29 March 1924 – 9 June 1924
- Prime Minister: Raymond Poincaré
- Preceded by: Albert Peyronnet
- Succeeded by: Paul Jourdain

Minister of Commerce and Industry
- In office 29 October 1925 – 23 June 1926
- Prime Minister: Aristide Briand
- Preceded by: Charles Chaumet
- Succeeded by: Fernand Chapsal

Minister of Public Works
- In office 23 June 1926 – 19 July 1926
- Prime Minister: Aristide Briand
- Preceded by: Anatole de Monzie
- Succeeded by: André Tardieu

Personal details
- Born: 21 March 1874 Bettrechies, Nord, France
- Died: 3 May 1946 (aged 72) Paris, France

Charles Augustin Daniel Vincent (31 March 1874 – 3 May 1946), known as Daniel-Vincent, was a French teacher and politician. He was a deputy from 1910 to 1927, then a senator from 1927 to 1941. During World War I (1914–18) he served as an aviator, then as under secretary of state for Aviation. He tried to make the aircraft industry more effective in delivering planes of sufficient quality and numbers. As Minister of Labor in 1921–22 he introduced France's first social insurance bill. He also served in various cabinets as Minister of Education, Minister of Commerce and Minister of Public Works.

== Early years (1874–1914) ==
Charles Augustin Daniel Vincent was born on 31 March 1874 in Bettrechies, Nord. Daniel-Vincent studied at the école normale primaire supérieure in Saint-Cloud, the University of Lille and the Sorbonne. In 1901 he became a teacher at the école normale of Douai. In 1904 he transferred to the école normale of Paris. He continued to study, and in 1909 became a Doctor of Letters at Lille. Daniel-Vincent was elected deputy for the 3rd district of Avesnes, Nord, on the second ballot on 8 May 1910. He sat with the Radical Socialists. He was reelected as candidate of the Unified Radical Party on 26 April 1914.

== World War I (1914–18) ==
With the outbreak of World War I (1914–18) Vincent was mobilized and at his request assigned to the airforce. He served as a reconnaissance observer. He became second lieutenant and then lieutenant in a bomber squadron, and was decorated for his performance. He returned to the Chamber and joined the Finance committee, where he was rapporteur of the aviation budget.

Due to his knowledge of conditions in the aviation arm Vincent was appointed under-secretary of state for military aviation in the fifth cabinet of Alexandre Ribot, from 20 March 1917 to 12 September 1917. When he was appointed most French planes were inferior to the German fighters, but for contractual reasons inferior planes continued to be delivered. Vincent ordered the Service Technique de l'Aéronautique (STAé) to stop designing aircraft and return to supporting existing manufacturers. He tried to speed up production by subcontracting manufacture of airframes and engines, and threatened that if manufacturers did not cooperate he would assign their workers to combat duty.

Vincent was Minister of Education and Fine Arts in the cabinet of Paul Painlevé from 12 September 1917 to 16 November 1917.

== Later career (1919–46) ==
Vincent was reelected to the legislature in November 1919 on the Republican Federation list. He also became municipal councilor and mayor of Le Quesnoy in 1919, holding this office until 1940. He was appointed Minister of Labor and Social Assurance in the seventh cabinet of Aristide Briand, holding office from 16 January 1921 to 15 January 1922. In March 1921 he presented France's first social insurance bill, largely the work of his predecessor Paul Jourdain. The "Vincent bill", as it was called, proposed insurance that covered risks of illness, maternity, death, disability and old age, and that would be obligatory for all workers in commerce, industry and agriculture, and voluntary for small business owners, artisans and peasant smallholders. The bill was not passed, but provided the basis for future proposals.

On 16 October 1921 Vincent was elected to the general council of Nord representing Berlaimont. He was reelected in 1922 and 1928, but was defeated in 1934. He was Minister of Labor and Hygiene in the third cabinet of Raymond Poincaré from 29 March 1924 to 9 June 1924.

Vincent was reelected in the elections of 11 May 1924. On 29 October 1925 he was appointed Minister of Commerce and Industry in the third Painlevé cabinet. He retained this post until 23 June 1926 in the eight and ninth Briand cabinets. In the tenth Briand cabinet he was Minister of Public Works from 23 June 1929 to 19 July 1926. Vincent was elected senator in a byelection on 29 May 1927, and was reelected on 16 October 1932. In the senate he sat with the Radical Democratic Left and Radical Socialist group. During World War II (1939–45), on 10 July 1940 Daniel-Vincent voted for the constitutional change that gave full power to the government of Marshal Philippe Pétain. Daniel Vincent died in Paris on 3 May 1946. (Note: As of 27 November 2015 the bibliographical entry on the French Senate website said Vincent died in Paris on 3 May 1946. The entry for Vincent in the Ministry of Education research website gives the same date and place. However, the website of the Bibliothèque nationale de France says he died on 9 September 1960 in Dreux, Eure-et-Loir.)

== Publications ==
- Daniel-Vincent, Charles (1909). L'Éducation par l'action (in French). Thesis, Université de Lille. Lille: C. Robbe. p. 231.
- Daniel-Vincent, Charles (1918). La Bataille de l'air (in French). Paris: Berger-Levrault. p. 64.

== Sources ==
- "Daniel-Vincent, Charles" (in French). BnF.
- Dutton, Paul V. (2002-05-16). Origins of the French Welfare State: The Struggle for Social Reform in France, 1914–1947. Cambridge University Press. ISBN 978-1-139-43296-2.
- Jolly, Jean (1960–1977). "VINCENT (CHARLES, AUGUSTIN, Daniel dit DANIEL-VINCENT)". Dictionnaire des parlementaires français; notices biographiques sur les ministres, députés et sénateurs français de 1889 à 1940 (in French). Paris: Presses universitaires de France. ISBN 2-1100-1998-0.
- Murphy, Justin D. (2005). Military Aircraft, Origins to 1918: An Illustrated History of Their Impact. ABC-CLIO. ISBN 978-1-85109-488-2.
- "Repères historiques: Ministres". Site d’Accès au Droit de la Recherche et des Enseignements Scolaire et Supérieur - RLR (Adress'RLR) (in French). Archived from the original on 2015-12-08.
- Sumner, Ian (2015-04-30). Kings of the Air: French Aces and Airmen of the Great War. Pen and Sword. ISBN 978-1-4738-5734-6.
- Tucker, Spencer C. (2013-12-16). The European Powers in the First World War: An Encyclopedia. Taylor & Francis. ISBN 978-1-135-50701-5.
