= Eugène Raynaldy =

French politician

Jean Jacques Raynaldy

Minister of Commerce and Industry
- In office 14 June 1924 – 17 April 1925
- Prime Minister: Édouard Herriot
- Preceded by: Pierre-Étienne Flandin
- Succeeded by: Charles Chaumet

Minister of Justice
- In office 26 November 1933 – 27 January 1934
- Prime Minister: Camille Chautemps
- Preceded by: Albert Dalimier
- Succeeded by: Eugène Penancier

Personal details
- Born: 23 December 1869 Rodez, Aveyron. France
- Died: 15 June 1938 (aged 68) Rodez, Aveyron, France

Jean Jacques Raynaldy (23 December 1869 – 15 June 1938), mainly known as Eugène Raynaldy, was a French politician who was a deputy from 1919 to 1928 and a senator from 1930 to 1938. He was Minister of Commerce and Industry in 1924–25 and Minister of Justice in 1933–34.

== Early years ==
Jean Jacques Raynaldy was born on 23 December 1869 in Rodez, Aveyron, to a family of modest means. He managed to obtain a legal education and became a successful attorney in Rodez. He was a moderate Republican, and presented his political ideas in articles he wrote for the regional press, particularly the Courrier de l'Aveyron. He ran in the general elections of 1910 as deputy for Aveyron but was defeated. He tried again in a by-election in 1912, but again lost. He did not run in the 1914 elections.

== Political career ==
In 1919 Raynaldy was elected municipal councilor in Rodez, and was mayor of the town from 1925 to 1935. In 1922 he was elected to the general council of the Aveyron department. On 16 November 1919 Raynaldy was elected deputy on the Left Republican Union list. He was reelected on 11 May 1924. He was Minister of Commerce and Industry from 14 June 1924 to 17 April 1925 in the first cabinet of Édouard Herriot. He was defeated in the general elections of 1928.

Raynaldy was elected senator for Aveyron on 20 October 1929, and joined the Democratic and Radical Union. He was Minister of Justice from 26 November 1933 to 27 January 1934 in the second cabinet of Camille Chautemps. While in office he was accused of being involved with the frauds of the Sacazan Bank. The right-wing Action Française created demonstrations with the objective of bringing about the fall of the Chautemps cabinet. On Saturday 27 January 1934, the Camelots du Roi came out in force in Paris, causing considerable damage. Raynaldy resigned that afternoon, followed by Chautemps.

Raynaldy suffered from heart problems, and was forced to retire to his home in Rodez, where he died on 15 June 1938 aged 68. A square in Rodez with a fountain is named after him.

== Sources ==
- Gilabert, René (1 November 2009), Rodez, Editions Un Autre Reg'Art, ISBN 978-2-916534-55-8
- Jenkins, Brian; Millington, Chris (24 March 2015), France and Fascism: February 1934 and the Dynamics of Political Crisis, Routledge, ISBN 978-1-317-50725-3
- Jolly, Jean (1960–1977). "RAYNALDY (JEAN-JACQUES, dit Eugène)". Dictionnaire des parlementaires français; notices biographiques sur les ministres, députés et sénateurs français de 1889 à 1940 (in French). Paris: Presses universitaires de France. ISBN 2-1100-1998-0.
- Weber, Eugen (1962), Action Française: Royalism and Reaction in Twentieth Century France, Stanford University Press, ISBN 978-0-8047-0134-1
