= Sarraut cabinet =

Sarraut cabinet may refer to Albert Sarraut's

- First Ministry, 26 October – 26 November 1933
- Second Ministry, 24 January – 4 June 1936

== See also ==
- History of France (1900–present)
- Interwar period § French Empire
