= Jacques Stern =

Jacques Stern may refer to:

- Jacques Stern (cryptographer)
- Jacques Stern (politician)
