= Jean Valadier =

French politician (1878–1959)

Jean Marie Albin Édouard Valadier

Minister of Labor and Social Assurance
- In office 30 January 1934 – 6 February 1934
- Preceded by: Eugène Frot
- Succeeded by: Adrien Marquet

Personal details
- Born: 7 September 1878 Nîmes, Gard, France
- Died: 9 December 1959 (aged 81) Paris, France
- Occupation: Lawyer and administrator

Jean Marie Albin Édouard Valadier (7 September 1878 – 9 December 1959) was a French lawyer, administrator and politician who was senator from 1928 to 1945, and was briefly Minister of Labor and Social Security in 1934.

== Early years ==
Jean Marie Albin Édouard Valadier was born on 7 September 1878 in Nîmes, Gard. In July 1904 he obtained a degree in Law, and became private secretary to René Viviani, Minister of Labor. In March 1911 he was appointed controller at the Ministry of Labor. He was elected to the municipal council of Brou, Eure-et-Loir, in May 1912. During World War I (1914–18) he won the Croix de Guerre in October 1915 and the Legion of Honor (military) in January 1918.

Valadier was secretary general of the French high commission in Great Britain, then in March 1920 became controller general of the Ministry of Labor. He headed the office of Albert Peyronnet, Minister of Labor in the second cabinet of Raymond Poincaré in 1922. In January 1923 he was appointed director of pensions and social insurance. In June 1926 he was elected to the general council of Eure-et-Loir, and in October 1926 was elected mayor of Brou.

== National politics ==
On 5 May 1928 Valadier ran as a Radical in the senatorial by-election for Eure-et-Loir, and won in the second round of voting. He was reelected in the first round on 23 October 1929. He sat in the Senate with the Democratic, Radical and Radical Socialist Left. On 30 January 1934 he was appointed Minister of Labor and Social Assurance in the second cabinet of Édouard Daladier, which resigned the day after the events of 6 February 1934.

During World War II (1939–45) Valadier was proclaimed vice-president of the Senate on 11 January 1940. On 8 February 1940 he was designated to chair the High Court of Justice in the absence of the president. On 10 July 1940 Valadier voted in Vichy in favor of the constitutional law that gave full powers to Marshal Philippe Pétain. Valadier explained, "it is better to keep in contact with Petain and collaborate with him in order to try to save the Senate and to preserve something of our democratic laws. I don't believe ... that, in the new constitution that the Marshal will draft, the Senate will be abolished. It will only be modified."

Valadier was closely associated with Pierre-Étienne Flandin. He was appointed to the National Council that Flandin established in January 1941. On 7 February 1941 Valadier proposed that the Senate alone should have the role of "representation of the country". Its role would be advisory, through a committee of thirty on the basic laws. After the Liberation of France Valadier was expelled from the Radical Party. He died in Paris on 9 December 1959 aged 81.

== Sources ==
- collectif (2005). "VALADIER (Jean)". Dictionnaire des parlementaires français de 1940 à 1958 (in French). Paris: La Documentation française.
- Jolly, Jean (1960–1977). "VALADIER (JEAN, MARIE, ALBIN, EDOUARD)". Dictionnaire des parlementaires français; notices biographiques sur les ministres, députés et sénateurs français de 1889 à 1940 (in French). Paris: Presses universitaires de France. ISBN 2-1100-1998-0.
- Martinez, Gilles (July–September 1999), "Comment les libéraux sont arrivés à Vichy. Étude d'un parcours paradoxal", Revue d'histoire moderne et contemporaine, 46e (3), Societe d'Histoire Moderne et Contemporaine: 571–590, doi:10.3406/rhmc.1999.1980, JSTOR 20530471
- Wieviorka, Olivier (2009), Orphans of the Republic: The Nation's Legislators in Vichy France, Harvard University Press, ISBN 978-0-674-03261-3
