= Garat =

Garat may refer to

== Places ==
- Garat, Charente
- Garat, the Hungarian name for Dacia village, Jibert Commune, Braşov County, Romania

== People ==
- Anne-Marie Garat (born 1946), French novelist
- Dominique Garat (1735–1799), called the Old, French Basque politician, brother of Dominique-Joseph
- Dominique-Joseph Garat (1749–1833), French Basque politician, member of the Académie française
- Joseph Garat (1872–1944), French politician of the inter-war period (1918–1939)
- Pierre Garat (singer) (1762–1823), French "chanteur lyrique"; nephew of Dominique-Joseph Garat
- Pierre Garat (civil servant), head of the section for the Jewish question for the Gironde prefecture under the German occupation

== Fictional characters ==
- Garat, character in the webcomic Anima: Age of the Robots
