= Jean-Pierre Farandou =

French business executive and politician (born 1957)

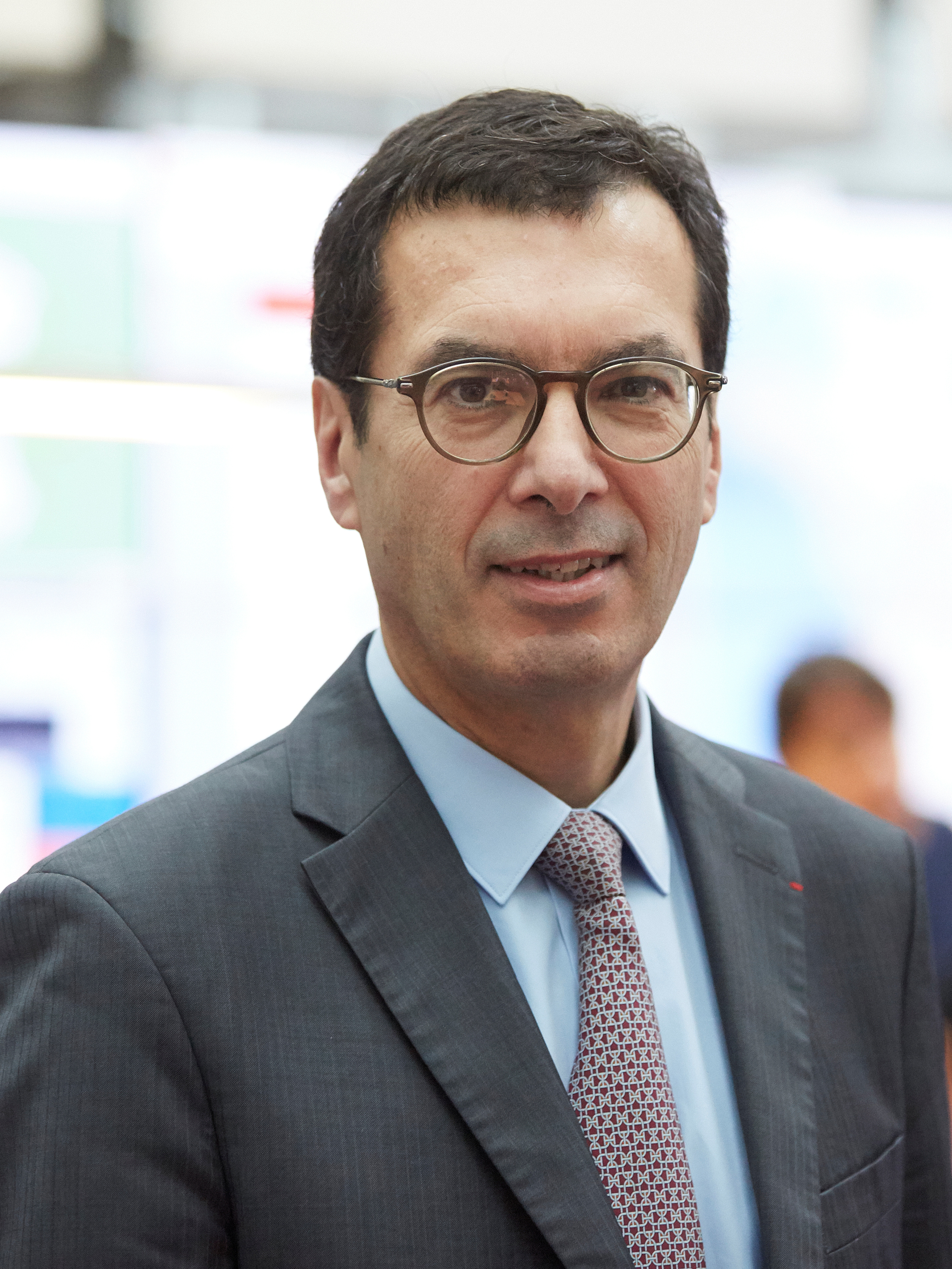
- Farandou in 2019

Minister of Labour and Solidarity
- Incumbent
- Assumed office 12 October 2025
- Prime Minister: Sébastien Lecornu
- Preceded by: Catherine Vautrin

Personal details
- Born: Jean-Pierre Eugène Farandou; 4 July 1957 (age 69) Bordeaux, France
- Party: Independent
- Education: Mines Paris – PSL

Jean-Pierre Eugène Farandou (French pronunciation: [ʒɑ̃pjɛʁ faʁɑ̃du]; born 4 July 1957) is a French business executive and politician who has served as Minister of Labour and Solidarity in Sébastien Lecornu's second government since 2025. From 2019 to 2025, he served as president of SNCF.
