= Paul Bacon (politician) =

French politician

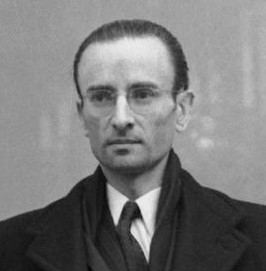
- Bacon in 1950

Member of the National Assembly of France
- In office 1945–1958

Personal details
- Born: 1 November 1907 Paris, France
- Died: 6 December 1999 (aged 92) Gimont, France
- Party: MRP

Paul Bacon (1 November 1907 – 6 December 1999) was a French politician.

== Biography ==
Bacon was born in Paris. During World War II, he was active in the French Resistance, specifically with the MLN. He was a member of Georges Bidault's National Liberation Movement, and distributed a manifesto about trade unionism in December 1940. Bacon was arrested by the Gestapo in 1943.

After the war, Bacon continued his political career. A member of the Christian Democratic Popular Republican Movement (MRP), he was Member of the two National Constituent Assemblies (1945–46) and then of the National Assembly from 1946 to 1958 representing the Seine Department. He was Secretary of state in the prime minister's office in 1959-1960, Minister of Labour and Social security (with some interruptions during the cabinets of Pinay and of Mendès France) from 1950 to 1956 and again in 1957-1959.

He was Minister of Labour in De Gaulle, Debré and Pompidou governments from 1958 to 1962. With the other MRP ministers, he resigned in protest after De Gaulle's press conference about European integration in May 1962. He sat in the Economic and Social Council from 1962 to 1964. Bacon was also a municipal councillor at Saint-Maur-des-Fossés.

A trade unionist and an adept of social harmony, Paul Bacon was one of the major figures who built French social security and was the father of the Interprofessional Guaranteed Minimum Wage (salaire minimum interprofessionnel garanti, or SMIG).

== Books ==
Bacon wrote several books:

- La Naissance de la classe ouvrière
- Vers la réforme de l'entreprise capitaliste
- Vers la démocratie économique et sociale
