= Minister of Labour, Employment and Economic Inclusion (France) =

Government ministry of France

Ministry of Labour and Solidarity
- Ministère du Travail et des Solidarités
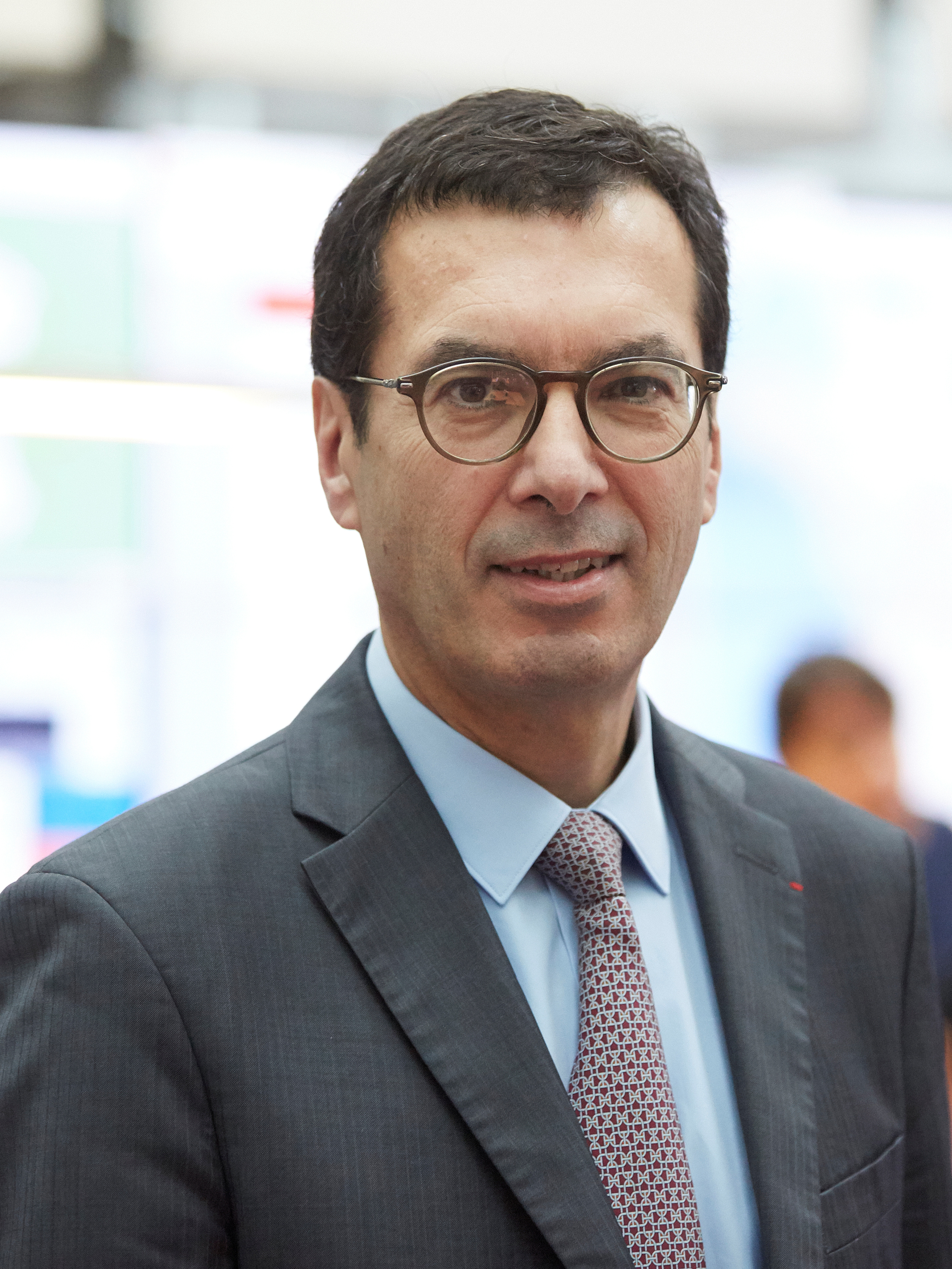
- Incumbent; Jean-Pierre Farandou since 12 October 2025
- Minister of Labours
- Member of: Cabinet
- Reports to: President of the Republic; Prime Minister
- Seat: Hôtel du Châtelet
- Nominator: Prime Minister
- Appointer: President of the Republic
- Term length: No fixed term
- Formation: 1906
- Website: https://travail-emploi.gouv.fr

The Minister of Labour, Employment and Economic Inclusion (Ministre du Travail, de l'Emploi et de l'Insertion), commonly just referred to as Minister of Labour, is a cabinet member in the Government of France. The minister is responsible for employment, labour legislation as well as the integration of foreigners.

Following Sébastien Lecornu's second appointment as Prime Minister, the minister is Jean-Pierre Farandou.

== History ==
The position was originally known as Minister of Labour (Ministre du Travail), created in 1906, and later, Minister of Labour and Social Security Provisions (Ministre du Travail et Prévoyance sociale). After its 1906 creation, the Inspection du travail (IT, Labour Inspection) service was integrated to it.

After the Second World War, the position was renamed Minister of Social Affairs. In its current state, the position was brought back in 1981 (after almost a decade) under the presidency of François Mitterrand—as a result of the economic situation of France in the 1980s—to oversee issues of social exclusion, unemployment, racism, sexism and social justice.

The seat of the ministry is the hôtel du Châtelet, an 18th-century neoclassical palace located in the 7th arrondissement of Paris.

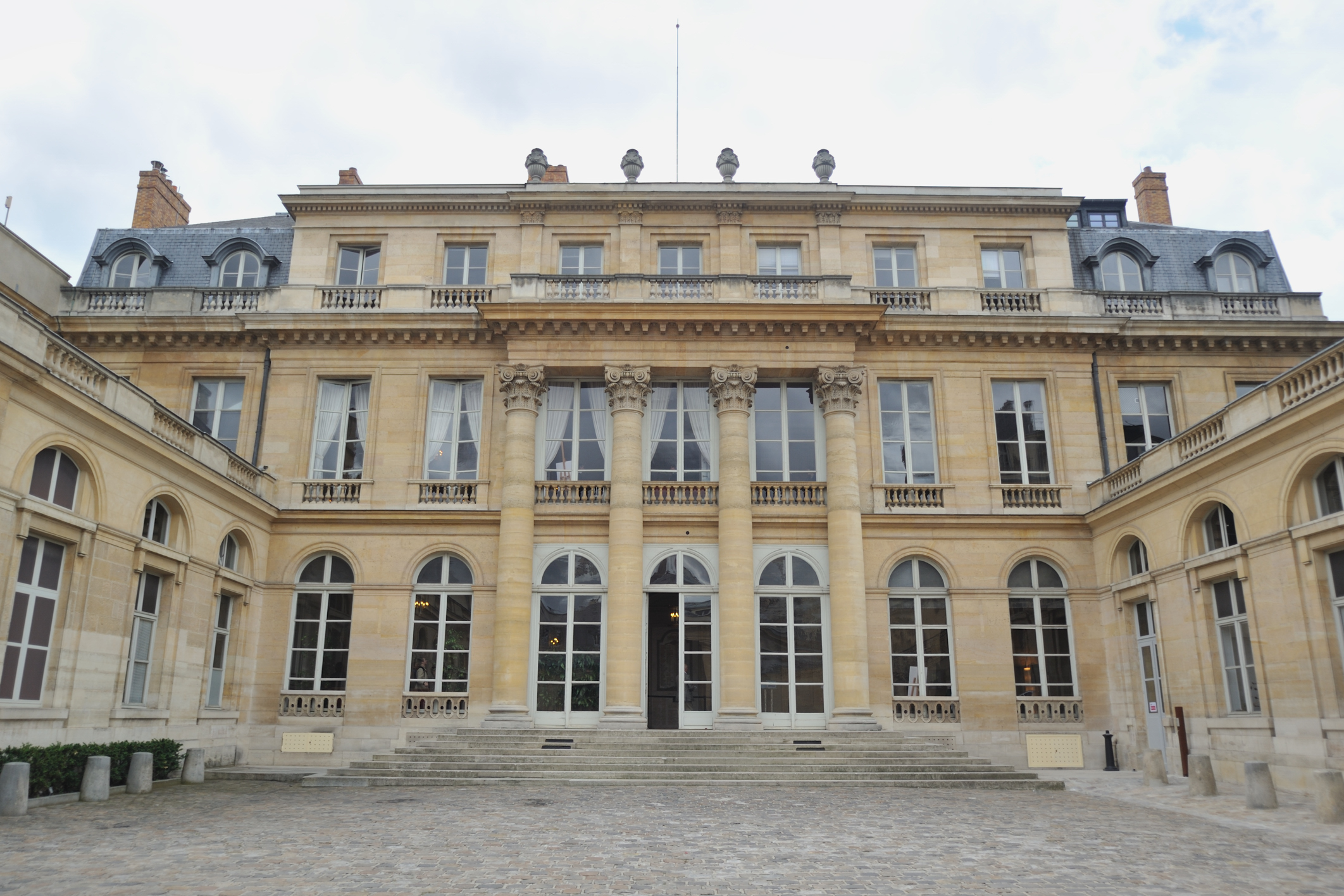
Hôtel du Châtelet in Paris, home of the Ministry of Labour and the minister's official residence.

== List of ministers of labour ==
=== Third Republic ===
- Gaston Doumergue (14 March 1906 – 25 October 1906)
- René Viviani (25 October 1906 – 2 November 1910)
- Louis Lafferre (3 November 1910 – 1 March 1911)
- Joseph Paul-Boncour (2 March 1911 – 26 November 1911)
- René Renoult (27 November 1911 – 13 January 1912)
- Léon Bourgeois (14 January 1912 – 20 January 1913)
- René Besnard (21 January 1913 – 21 March 1913)
- Henry Chéron (22 March 1913 – 8 December 1913)
- Albert Métin (9 December 1913 – 8 June 1914)
- Jean-Baptiste Abel (9 June 1914 – 13 June 1914)
- Maurice Couyba (13 June 1914 – 26 August 1914)
- Jean-Baptiste Bienvenu-Martin (27 August 1914 – 30 October 1915)
- Albert Métin (30 October 1915 – 14 December 1916)
- Étienne Clémentel (14 December 1916 – 20 March 1917)
- Léon Bourgeois (20 March 1917 – 12 September 1917)
- André Renard (12 September 1917 – 11 November 1917)
- Pierre Colliard (11 November 1917 – 2 December 1919)
- Paul Jourdain ( 2 December 1919 – 16 January 1921)
- Daniel Vincent (16 January 1921 – 15 January 1922)
- Albert Peyronnet (15 January 1922 – 29 March 1924)
- Daniel Vincent (29 March 1924 – 9 June 1924)
- Paul Jourdain (9 June 1924 – 14 June 1924)
- Justin Godart (14 June 1924 – 14 April 1925)
- Antoine Durafour (17 April 1925 – 19 July 1926)
- Louis Pasquet (19 July 1926 – 23 July 1926)
- André Fallières (23 July 1926 – 1 June 1928)
- Louis Loucheur (1 June 1928 – 2 March 1930)
- Pierre Laval (2 March 1930 – 13 December 1930)
- Édouard Grinda (13 December 1930 – 27 January 1931)
- Adolphe Landry (27 January 1931 – 20 February 1932)
- Pierre Laval (20 February 1932 – 3 June 1932)
- Albert Dalimier (4 June 1932 – 31 January 1933)
- François Albert (31 January 1933 – 26 October 1933)
- Eugène Frot (26 October 1933 – 26 November 1933)
- Lucien Lamoureux (26 November 1933 – 9 January 1934)
- Eugène Frot (9 January 1934 – 30 January 1934)
- Jean Valadier (30 January 1934 – 9 February 1934)
- Adrien Marquet (9 February 1934 – 8 November 1934)
- Paul Jacquier (8 November 1934 – 1 June 1935)
- Ludovic-Oscar Frossard (1 June 1935 – 4 June 1935)
- Jean-Baptiste Lebas (4 June 1936 – 22 June 1937)
- André Février (22 June 1937 – 18 January 1938)
- Paul Ramadier (18 January 1938 – 13 March 1938)
- Albert Sérol (13 March 1938 – 10 April 1938)
- Paul Ramadier (10 April 1938 – 21 August 1938)
- Charles Pomaret (21 August 1938 – 16 June 1940)
- André Février (16 June 1940 – 27 June 1940)
- Charles Pomaret (27 June 1940 – 12 July 1940)

=== Vichy France ===
- René Belin (15 July 1940 – 18 April 1942)
- Hubert Lagardelle (20 April 1942 – 23 November 1943)
- Jean Bichelonne (23 November 1943 – 17 March 1944)
- Marcel Déat (17 March 1944 – 20 August 1944)

=== Provisional Government of the French Republic ===
- Adrien Tixier (7 June 1944 – 9 September 1944) (French Committee of National Liberation)
- René Sanson (28 August 1944 – 5 September 1944) (Provisional Government of the French Republic)
- Alexandre Parodi (10 September 1944 – 21 November 1945) (Provisional Government of the French Republic)
- Ambroise Croizat (21 November 1945 – 16 December 1946) (Provisional Government of the French Republic)

=== Fourth Republic ===
- Daniel Mayer (16 December 1946 – 22 January 1947)
- Ambroise Croizat (22 January 1947 – 4 May 1947)
- Robert Lacoste (4 May 1947 – 9 May 1947)
- Daniel Mayer (9 May 1947 – 28 October 1949)
- Pierre Ségelle (29 October 1949 – 7 February 1950)
- Paul Bacon (7 February 1950 – 8 March 1952)
- Pierre Garet (8 March 1952 – 8 January 1953)
- Paul Bacon (8 January 1953 – 19 June 1954)
- Eugène Claudius-Petit (19 June 1954 – 3 September 1954)
- Louis-Paul Aujoulat (3 September 1954 – 23 February 1955)
- Paul Bacon (23 February 1955 – 1 February 1956)
- Albert Gazier (1 February 1956 – 6 November 1957)
- Paul Bacon (6 November 1957 – 8 January 1959)

=== Fifth Republic ===
- Jean-Marcel Jeanneney (8 January 1966 – 30 May 1968)
- Maurice Schumann (30 May 1968 – 20 June 1969)
- Edgar Faure (6 July 1972 – 28 March 1973)
- Nicole Questiaux (22 May 1981 – 29 June 1982)
- Pierre Bérégovoy (29 June 1982 – 17 July 1984)
- Georgina Dufoix (19 July 1984 – 7 December 1984)
- Philippe Séguin (20 March 1986 – 12 May 1988)
- Michel Delebarre (12 May 1988 – 23 June 1988)
- Claude Évin (23 June 1988 – 16 May 1991)
- Jean-Louis Bianco (16 May 1991 – 2 April 1992)
- René Teulade (2 April 1992 – 29 March 1993)
- Simone Veil (29 March 1993 – 18 May 1995)
- Colette Codaccioni (18 May 1995 – 7 November 1995)
- Eric Raoult (18 May 1995 – 7 November 1995)
- Jacques Barrot (7 November 1995 – 4 June 1997)
- Jean-Claude Gaudin (7 November 1995 – 4 June 1997)
- Martine Aubry (4 June 1997 – 18 October 2000)
- Élisabeth Guigou (18 October 2000 – 7 May 2002)
- François Fillon (7 May 2002 – 31 March 2004)
- Jean-Louis Borloo (31 March 2004 – 18 May 2007)
- Xavier Bertrand (18 May 2007 – 15 January 2009)
- Brice Hortefeux (16 January 2009 – 23 June 2009)
- Xavier Darcos (23 June 2009 – 21 March 2010)
- Éric Woerth (21 March 2010 – 14 November 2010)
- Xavier Bertrand (14 November 2010 – 10 May 2012)
- Michel Sapin/Marisol Touraine (16 May 2012 – 2017)
- Muriel Pénicaud (17 May 2017 – 6 July 2020)
- Élisabeth Borne (6 July 2020 – 16 May 2022)
- Olivier Dussopt (16 May 2022 – 11 January 2024)
- Catherine Vautrin (11 January 2024 – 21 September 2024)
- Astrid Panosyan (21 September 2024 – 23 December 2024)
- Catherine Vautrin (23 December 2024 – 12 October 2025)
- Jean-Pierre Farandou (12 October 2025 – present)
