= Eugène Frot =

French politician (1893–1983)

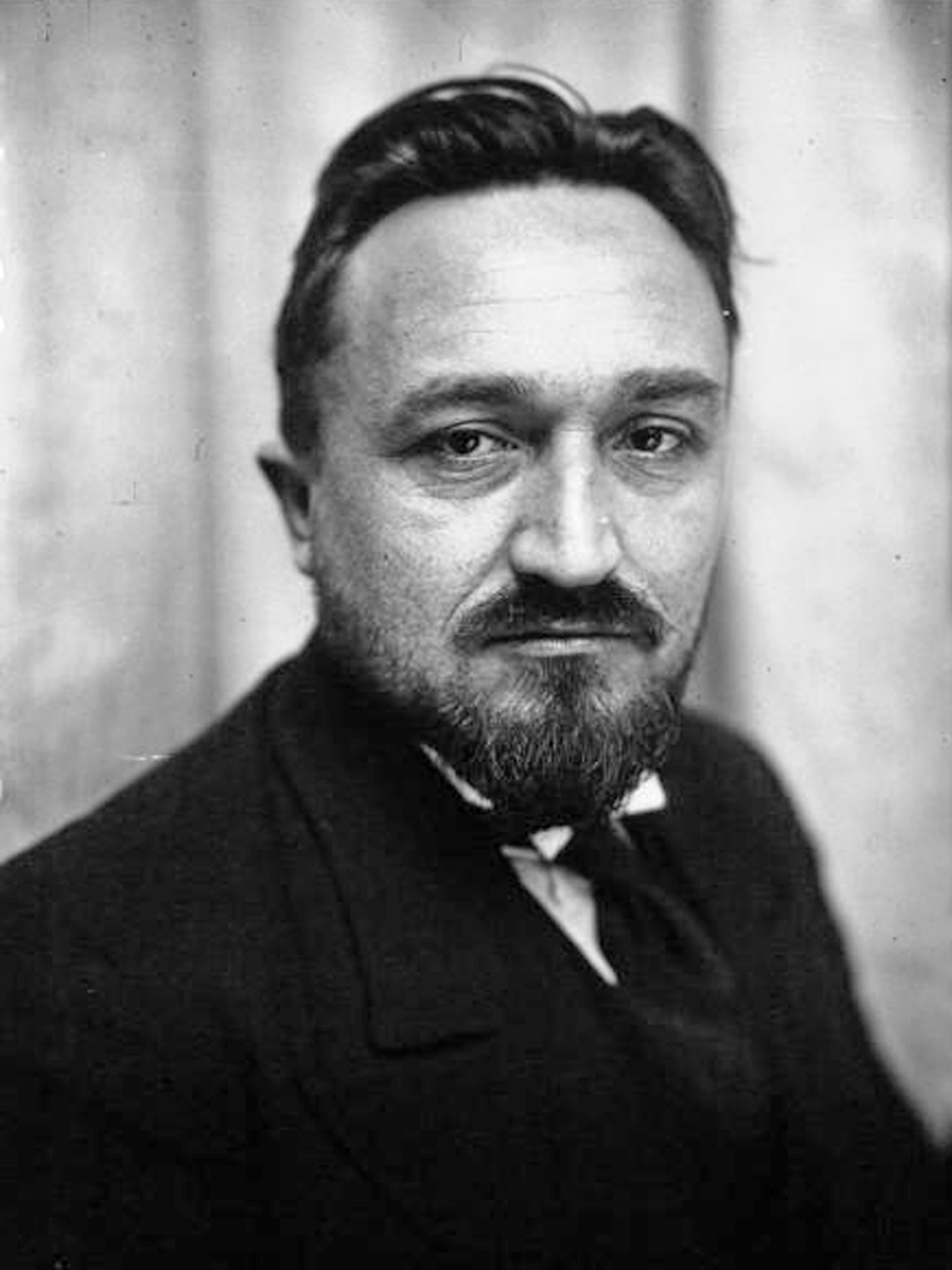
- Frot in 1929

Minister of Merchant Marine
- In office 31 January 1933 – 24 October 1933
- Prime Minister: Édouard Daladier
- Preceded by: Léon Meyer
- Succeeded by: Jacques Stern

Minister of Labor and Social Assurance
- In office 26 October 1933 – 23 November 1933
- Prime Minister: Albert Sarraut
- Preceded by: François Albert
- Succeeded by: Lucien Lamoureux

Minister of Merchant Marine
- In office 26 November 1933 – 9 January 1934
- Prime Minister: Camille Chautemps
- Preceded by: Jacques Stern
- Succeeded by: William Bertrand

Minister of Labor and Social Assurance
- In office 9 January 1934 – 27 January 1934
- Prime Minister: Camille Chautemps
- Preceded by: Lucien Lamoureux
- Succeeded by: Jean Valadier

Minister of the Interior
- In office 30 January 1934 – 7 February 1934
- Prime Minister: Édouard Daladier
- Preceded by: Camille Chautemps
- Succeeded by: Albert Sarraut

Personal details
- Born: 2 October 1893 Montargis, Loiret, France
- Died: 10 April 1983 (aged 89) Château-Landon, Seine-et-Marne, France

Eugène Frot (2 October 1893 – 10 April 1983) was a French politician who was Minister of Merchant Marine (twice), Minister of Labor and Social Assurance (twice) and Minister of the Interior in various short-lived cabinets between December 1932 and February 1934. While he was Minister of Interior, right-wing groups organized street demonstrations in Paris on 6 February 1934 in which the police shot dead fourteen people. In the aftermath the cabinet was forced to resign. Frot supported Republican institutions, but by the late 1930s was a committed pacifist. In July 1940 he voted for the constitutional change that established the collaborationist Vichy government. As a result, he was barred from politics after the war.

== Early years (1893–1924) ==
Eugène Frot was born on 2 October 1893 in Montargis, Loiret. He became an attorney at the Paris court of appeal, and a publicist. In the general election of 1919 he ran for Loiret at the head of the Republican Concentration and Renovation list, but was not elected.

== Political career (1924–41) ==
=== Deputy (1924–32) ===
On 11 May 1924 Frot ran again as candidate of the Left Union, and was elected. He joined the Socialist group in the chamber. He was reelected in the first round for the Montargis constituency on the list of the Union of Radical Lefts and Socialists. He joined the committees on Foreign Affairs and on Public Works & Communications. He was reelected in the first round in 1932.

=== Cabinet positions (1932–34) ===
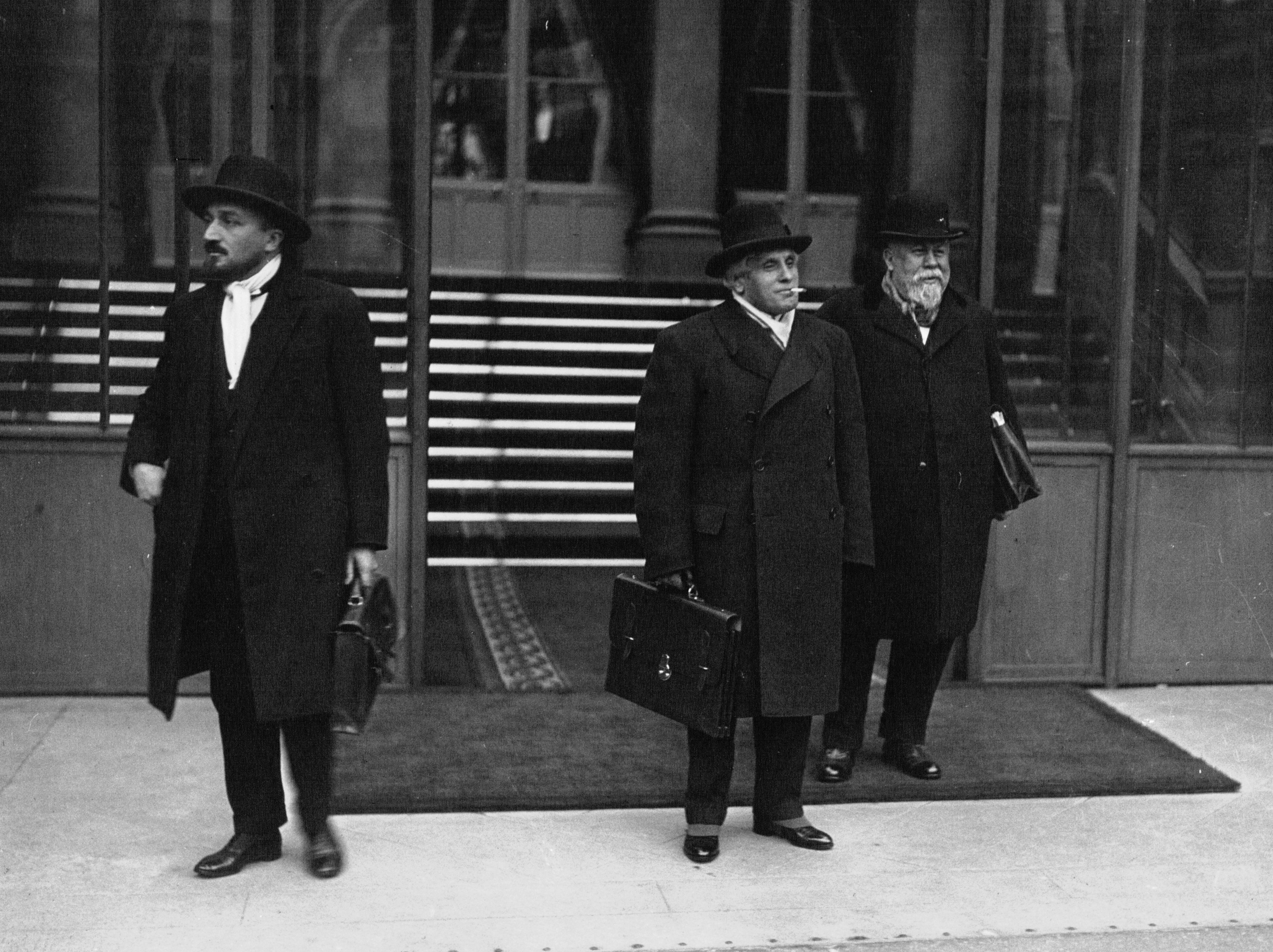
Frot (left), Joseph Paul-Boncour and Henri Chéron leaving the Élysée in 1933

Frot was under secretary of state for the president of the council from 18 December 1932 to 28 January 1933 in the cabinet of Joseph Paul-Boncour. He was Minister of Merchant Marine from 31 January 1933 to 24 October 1933 in the cabinet of Édouard Daladier. He was Minister of Labor and Social Assurance from 26 October 1933 to 23 November 1933 in the cabinet of Albert Sarraut. He was Minister of Merchant Marine from 26 November 1933 to 9 January 1934. He was Minister of Labor and Social Assurance from 9 January 1934 to 27 January 1934.

=== Minister of interior (30 January 1934 – 7 February 1934) ===
On 30 January 1934 Frot was appointed Minister of the Interior in Daladier's new cabinet. Right wing groups began rumors that Frot was the leader of a group of Daladier's ministers who aimed to establish a "dictatorship of the left". These groups organized a street demonstration on 6 February 1934 in Paris that turned into a riot. The police opened fire on the demonstrators. Fourteen were killed, 57 received bullet wounds and 655 were injured. One policeman was killed. Frot remained at the Ministry of the Interior that evening trying to track what was happening, but was handicapped by wildly inaccurate reports that did not mention civilian casualties but stressed violence against the police.

Daladier, several ministers and senior officials gathered at the Ministry of the Interior, where Frot recommended declaration of a state of siege, preventative arrests and a ban on arms sales. He was opposed by Charles Donat-Guigue, the attorney general, on various legal and constitutional grounds. After Donat-Guigue left Frot gave Perrier, the head of police intelligence, authority to arrest extreme right and extreme left leaders other than municipal councilors, members of parliament, journalists and ancien combattants. After the others had left, Frot requisitioned army units, launched investigations against the right-wing leaders Charles Maurras and Maurice Pujo, called for an interim ban on all public demonstrations and informed the press and radio of the measures taken. He said "Tomorrow we may have to defend order again; we will do so for France and the Republic."

The police were not effective in their preventative arrests. They could not find Pujo. Maurras, who was soundly sleeping, did not open his door. The Garde Républicaine and the police were demoralized, blaming the authorities for the trouble as much as the crowds. The next morning Frot received reports that the demonstrations would resume, with the protesters now carrying guns and grenades. He was told the Croix-de-Feu and Action Française were coordinating their actions, and the latter had condemned Frot to death. Frot sent a message to Daladier recommending that he resign to avoid civil war. Frot resigned, and at 1:30 pm Daladier also resigned.

=== Deputy (1934–41) ===
In the aftermath the Action Française journal accused Daladier, Frot, Pierre Cot and Léon Blum of having attempted a coup d'état, and called for them to be punished for the massacre of innocents. Frot was accused of having ordered his armed agents to fire on unarmed people. He was called the "minister with bloody hands" and "Frot the executioner" (Frot-le-fusilleur). He was ostracized by his colleagues. A group called the "Avocats du 6 Février", members of the Camelots du Roi, tried to prevent Frot working as an attorney, and started fights whenever Frot entered the Palais de Justice. When Frot campaigned in 1935 for the Popular Front he was harassed by Camelots wherever he spoke in France. Nevertheless, Frot was reelected in the first round on 26 April 1936. He sat with the Socialist and Republican Union, but was less active in the chamber.

Frot vacillated in his political positions. The pacifist Léon Emery stated at the 1935 congress of the Ligue des droits de l'homme, "Parliament has, in the last twenty years, done nothing for democracy ... the distrinction between fascist states and democratic ones is merely a question of degree and not a fundamental one." Frot spoke out against this position, saying "parliament is, after all ... the reflection of the wishes of universal suffrage." This drew boos that forced him to leave the podium. By the late 1930s he had joined the extreme pacifists. During World War II (1939–45) he voted on 10 July 1940 in favor of the constitutional law that gave full powers to Marshal Philippe Pétain.

== Later career (1941–83) ==
Frot published articles in René Château's collaborationist paper France Socialiste. He also joined the National Popular Rally (RNP). He agreed to sit in the Vichy National Council, but soon resigned, and in 1941 refused to enter the government of Admiral François Darlan. In 1941–42 he wrote a number of articles that defended the Republic. He helped the Nord movement but did not actively participate in the French Resistance. After the Liberation of France the jury of honor declared he was ineligible for elective office due to his vote on 10 July 1940. He resumed his career as an attorney for a short period, then became involved in company management. Eugène Frot died on 10 April 1983 in Château-Landon, Seine-et-Marne.

== Sources ==
- Callil, Carmen (2008-12-10). Bad Faith: A Forgotten History of Family, Fatherland and Vichy France. Knopf Doubleday Publishing Group. ISBN 978-0-307-48188-7.
- Collectif (2001). "Eugène FROT". Dictionnaire des parlementaires français de 1940 à 1958 (in French). Vol. 4. E-K. Paris: La Documentation française.
- Irvine, William (2006-12-08). Between Justice And Politics: The Ligue Des Droits De L'Homme, 1898–1945. Stanford University Press. ISBN 978-0-8047-6787-3.
- Jenkins, Brian; Millington, Chris (2015-03-24). France and Fascism: February 1934 and the Dynamics of Political Crisis. Taylor & Francis. ISBN 978-1-317-50724-6.
- Jolly, Jean (1960–1977). "Frot (Eugène)" (PDF). Dictionnaire des parlementaires français; notices biographiques sur les ministres, députés et sénateurs français de 1889 à 1940 (in French). Paris: Presses universitaires de France. ISBN 2-1100-1998-0.
- Kennedy, Sean (2007-02-27). Reconciling France against Democracy: The Croix de Feu and the Parti Social Français, 1927–1945. MQUP. ISBN 978-0-7735-7814-2.
- Leduc, Édouard (2011). Une affaire d'État : le dossier Stavisky (in French). Editions Publibook. ISBN 978-2-7483-7300-4.
- Weber, Eugen (1962). Action Française: Royalism and Reaction in Twentieth Century France. Stanford University Press. ISBN 978-0-8047-0134-1.
