= Maurice Sarraut =

French journalist

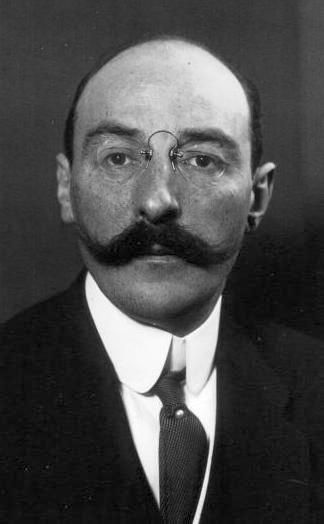
Maurice Sarraut

Maurice Sarraut (French: [mɔʁis saʁo]; 22 September 1869 in Bordeaux – 2 December 1943) was a French journalist and politician. He was the older brother of Albert Sarraut.

Sarraut was then committed to the newspaper La Dépêche de Toulouse while he was training to be a lawyer. In 1892, he organized the Paris branch of the newspaper and made many ties with Members of Parliament and ministers. He became executive director of the newspaper in 1909 and joined a group close to Pierre Lafitte.

He was assassinated on 2 December 1943 at his villa on the outskirts of Toulouse. The collaborationist press immediately accused the Resistance, but very soon, the police arrested the killers. However, they were shortly released after the intervention of Joseph Darnand and the German authorities. At the end of the war, the regional leader of the Milice, Henry Frossard, was accused of providing weapons and vehicles to the killers and was executed on 14 May 1945.

Sarraut is buried in the cemetery of St. Vincent, Carcassonne, Languedoc-Roussillon.
