= Charles Pomaret =

French lawyer, journalist, historian, and statesman

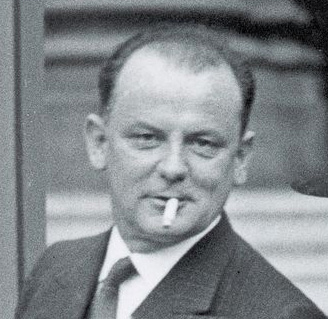
- Charles Pomaret in 1938

Minister of the Interior
- In office June 16, 1940 – June 26, 1940
- President: Albert Lebrun
- Preceded by: Georges Mandel
- Succeeded by: Adrien Marquet

Minister of Labour
- In office June 27, 1940 – July 12, 1940
- President: Albert Lebrun
- Preceded by: André Février
- Succeeded by: René Belin
- In office August 23, 1938 – June 23, 1940
- President: Albert Lebrun
- Preceded by: Paul Ramadier
- Succeeded by: André Février

Personal details
- Born: August 16, 1897 Montpellier, France
- Died: September 11, 1984 (aged 87) Saint-Paul-de-Vence, France
- Party: Socialist Republican Union (1935–1940)
- Education: University of Grenoble
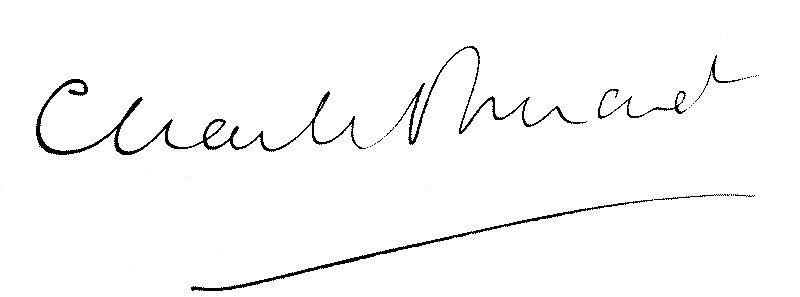
- Signature

Charles Pomaret (August 16, 1897 – September 11, 1984) was a French lawyer, journalist, historian, and statesman of the Third French Republic.

== Biography ==
=== Early years ===
Charles Henri Pomaret was born in Montpellier on August 16, 1897. He studied in Marseille, first at the Saint-Charles annexe of the Lycée Thiers, which served as his secondary school, before entering the Lycée Thiers in the seconde class. After passing his baccalauréat, he went on to study at the Faculty of Law and Literature in Grenoble.

He interrupted his studies to enlist in 1915. For his conduct at the front, he was awarded the Croix de Guerre 1914–1918 with two commendations, and the officer's ribbon of the Polonia Restituta.

Once peace had returned, he resumed his studies and became the youngest Licencié ès-lettres in France. He took the competitive examination for the Conseil d'État and became its youngest auditeur, as well as being top of his class. He obtained a doctorate in law in 1922 from the University of Grenoble, with a thesis entitled "La Politique française des combustibles liquides: pétrole, charbon liquide, alcool, le carburant national".

=== Political career ===
A Socialist-Republican, he was elected Member of Parliament for Lozère in 1928, and became Under-Secretary of State for Technical Education between 1931 and 1932. In 1938, and until 1940, he was Minister of Labour. He combined this role with that of Minister of the Interior in 1940, becoming the last Minister of Labour and Minister of the Interior of the Third Republic. In this capacity, it was he who authorised the departure of the liner Massilia, which carried many members of parliament to North Africa. Then, on 27 June 1940, he took over the Labour portfolio from André Février, who had been appointed Minister of Communications. He left office on 12 July 1940.

In addition to his career in politics and as a lawyer, Charles Pomaret was a journalist from 1925 to 1938, serving as editor-in-chief of Renaissance politique and contributing to Le Capital, L'Ère nouvelle and Le Quotidien. He was also a political and economic writer, whose works include L'Armée à la conquête de l'Europe (1931) and La Politique française des combustibles liquides (1933).

Charles Pomaret died in Saint-Paul-de-Vence on 11 September 1984.

== Private life ==
Charles Pomaret married Marie Paule Fontenelle, the widow of Henry Lapauze, curator of the Musée des Beaux-Arts de la Ville de Paris, on 2 July 1928 in Paris.

The couple collected works of art, all of which were sold at Hôtel Drouot in Paris on 22 March 1976. The Musée d'Orsay holds a Pêcheur à la coquille (Fisherman with a Shell) painted around 1860 by Jean-Baptiste Carpeaux, which came from their collection. Charles Despiau sculpted a bust of his wife in 1932.

They divorced on 12 March 1975 and Marie Paule Fontenelle died three months later on 15 June 1975 in Neuilly-sur-Seine.
