= François Albert =

French journalist and politician

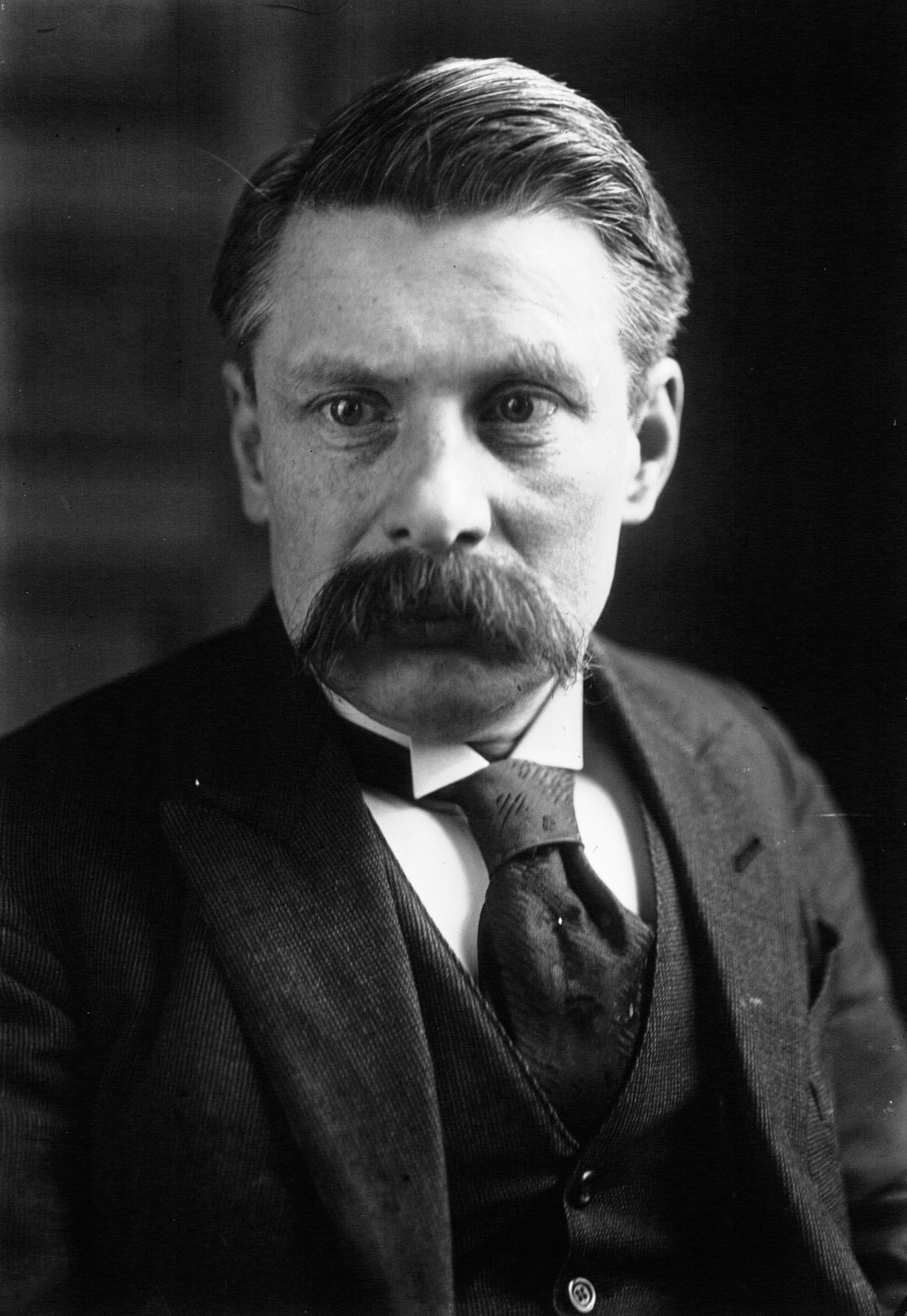
- Albert in 1924

Minister of Education and Fine Arts
- In office 14 June 1924 – 17 April 1925
- Prime Minister: Édouard Herriot
- Preceded by: Adolphe Landry
- Succeeded by: Anatole de Monzie

Minister of Labor
- In office 31 January 1933 – 25 October 1933
- Prime Minister: Édouard Daladier
- Preceded by: Albert Dalimier
- Succeeded by: Eugène Frot

Personal details
- Born: 4 April 1877 Bordeaux, France
- Died: 23 November 1933 (aged 56) Paris, France
- Party: Radical
- Occupation: Journalist

François Albert (French pronunciation: [fʁɑ̃swa albɛʁ]; 4 April 1877 – 23 November 1933) was a French journalist and politician. He was strongly anti-clerical. Albert was Minister of Education in 1924–25, and Minister of Labor in 1933. As education minister he promoted secular state schools (écoles uniques), state support for education of poor children, and reform of the curriculum to place greater emphasis on sciences and modern languages.

== Early years ==
François Albert was born in Bordeaux on 4 April 1877. He attended the École Normale Supérieure and gained a diploma in literature and a license in law. He taught literature in Laon and Paris, then became a journalist. He contributed to l'Aurore, Georges Clemenceau's l'Homme libre, La Dépêche de Toulouse, the Revue politique et parlementaire and l'Ere nouvelle.

== Political career ==
Albert was elected to represent the canton of Vouillé in the general council of Vienne. In 1920 he was elected senator for Vienne. Albert was known for his hostility to clericalism, and was vocal in opposition to reopening the French embassy to the Vatican. In the early 1920s there was heated debate between proponents of the repartition proportionelle scolaire, which would allow for state-supported religious schools, and the école unique in which all state schools would be secular. Albert represented the radicals at a February 1922 meeting arranged by the Ligue de la République to discuss defense of the secular public school, an area where the socialists and radicals were in agreement.

Albert became president of the Ligue de l'enseignement (Education League) shortly before being appointed Minister of Public Education in Édouard Herriot's mainly Radical government in 1924. He was Minister of Education from 14 June 1924 to 17 April 1925. Albert introduced an initial reform to the lycée (secondary school) curriculum on 9 August 1924 in which all pupils would now study French, history, geography and sciences. The student could choose in the last four years whether to concentrate on classics, modern languages, or science. In September he ordered that primary inspectors should have authority over elementary classes of the lycée, and these classes should accept capable primary school students.

At the annual meeting of the Ligue de l'enseignement in Valence on 1 November 1924 Albert gave a speech in which he attacked the Jesuits, whom he accused of wanting to suppress the university. Jean Guiraud (1866–1953), editor of the Roman Catholic La Croix (The Cross), described Albert as "uniting in his person the action of masonry and official action in national education". Guiraud said the école unique was "a sectarian enterprise that aims at establishing the monopoly of the atheist state." Herriot announced a committee on the école unique chaired by Ferdinand Buisson on 7 December 1924. At its first meeting, on 23 December 1924, Albert said the committee should keep in mind the importance of the école unique as a symbol of democracy. They should avoid religious questions, and should focus on developing practical recommendations for reform by 1 April 1925. In January 1925 Albert unified the examinations for secondary education scholarships so they covered studies at both the lycée and the école primaire supérieures.

Albert was defeated in the senatorial election in 1927. In 1928 Albert ran for election as deputy in the Melle constituency of Deux-Sèvres and was elected in the first round of voting. He was reelected in 1932. In June 1932 he succeeded Édouard Herriot as leader of the Radical Socialist group in the chamber. He was Minister of Labor from 31 January 1933 to 25 October 1933 in the first cabinet of Édouard Daladier. In the summer of 1933 he agreed to meet Alexandre Stavisky with Suzanne Avril and her father, the deputy Gaston Hulin. He listened while Stavisky outlined his grandiose plan to revive the French economy by using the proceeds of bonds backed by the agrarian fund to finance public works. Albert promised to consider the matter, and communicated further with Stavisky via Hulin, but was uneasy about the scheme and took no action before his death. (Note: It later became clear that Stavisky was engaged in fraud on a massive scale. He fled Paris in December 1934 and was found dead in Chamonix the next month. A huge public scandal resulted.)

François Albert died in Paris of an intestinal illness on 23 November 1933. He was a Knight of the Legion of Honour.

== Publications ==
- François Albert (1903). La représentation proportionnelle (in French). Tarbes: bureaux de l'Echo des oeuvres sociales. p. 12.
- Bayet, Albert; Albert, François, eds. (1904). Les Ecrivains politiques du XVIIIe siècle (in French). Paris: A. Colin. p. 446.
- François Albert (1909). Les Unifiés et le gouvernement de M. Clémenceau (in French). Paris: M. Rivière. p. 71.
- Armand Got, ed. (1927). La Poèmeraie. Anthologie moderne (in French). François Albert (preface), A. M. Gossez (Introduction), Edmond Rocher (illustrations). Paris: libr. Gedalge. p. 346.
- François Albert (1930). Cinquantenaire de la loi de J. Ferry (in French).

== Sources ==
- Jankowski, Paul (2002). Stavisky: A Confidence Man in the Republic of Virtue. Cornell University Press. ISBN 0-8014-3959-0.
- Jolly, Jean (1960–1977). "Albert (François) dit François-Albert". Dictionnaire des parlementaires français; notices biographiques sur les ministres, députés et sénateurs français de 1889 à 1940 (in French). Paris: Presses universitaires de France. ISBN 2-1100-1998-0.
- Talbott, John E. (2015-12-08). The Politics of Educational Reform in France, 1918-1940. Princeton University Press. ISBN 978-1-4008-7628-0.
