= Albert Sarraut =

French politician (1872–1962)

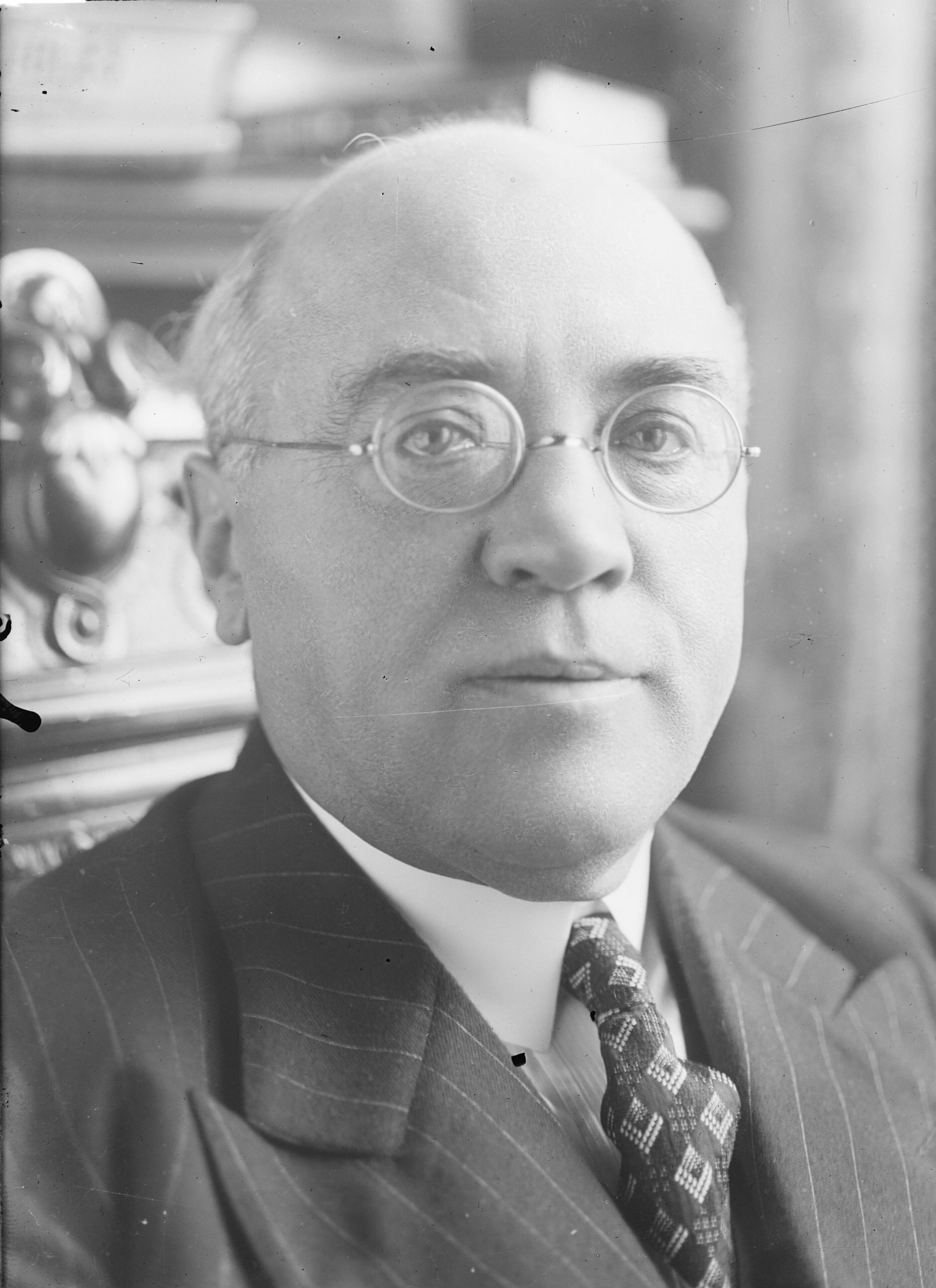
- Sarraut in 1932

Prime Minister of France
- In office 24 January 1936 – 4 June 1936
- President: Albert Lebrun
- Preceded by: Pierre Laval
- Succeeded by: Léon Blum
- In office 26 October 1933 – 26 November 1933
- President: Albert Lebrun
- Preceded by: Édouard Daladier
- Succeeded by: Camille Chautemps

Governor-General of French Indochina
- In office 22 January 1917 – 9 December 1919
- President: Raymond Poincaré
- Preceded by: Jean-François dit Eugène Charles
- Succeeded by: Maurice Antoine François Monguillot
- In office 15 November 1911 – 22 November 1913
- President: Armand Fallières; Raymond Poincaré
- Preceded by: Paul Louis Luce
- Succeeded by: Joost van Vollenhoven

Personal details
- Born: 28 July 1872 Bordeaux, Gironde, France
- Died: 26 November 1962 (aged 90) Paris, France
- Party: Radical

Albert-Pierre Sarraut (French: [albɛʁ saʁo]; 28 July 1872 – 26 November 1962) was a French Radical politician, twice Prime Minister during the Third Republic.

== Biography ==
Sarraut was born on 28 July 1872 in Bordeaux, Gironde, France.

On 14 March 1907 Sarraut, Senator of Aude and Under-Secretary of State for the Interior, was ridiculed by Clemenceau for trying to plead the case of his electorate during the revolt of the Languedoc winegrowers. Clemenceau told Sarraut, "I know the South, it will all end with a banquet". After massive demonstrations in the winegrowing region in June 1907 Clemenceau asked Sarraut to bring the leader Ernest Ferroul to the negotiating table. Ferroul told him: "When we have three million men behind us, we do not negotiate". From 17 June 1907 the Midi was occupied by 22 regiments of infantry and 12 regiments of cavalry. The gendarmerie was ordered to imprison the leaders of the demonstrations. Sarraut refused to endorse this policy and resigned from the government.

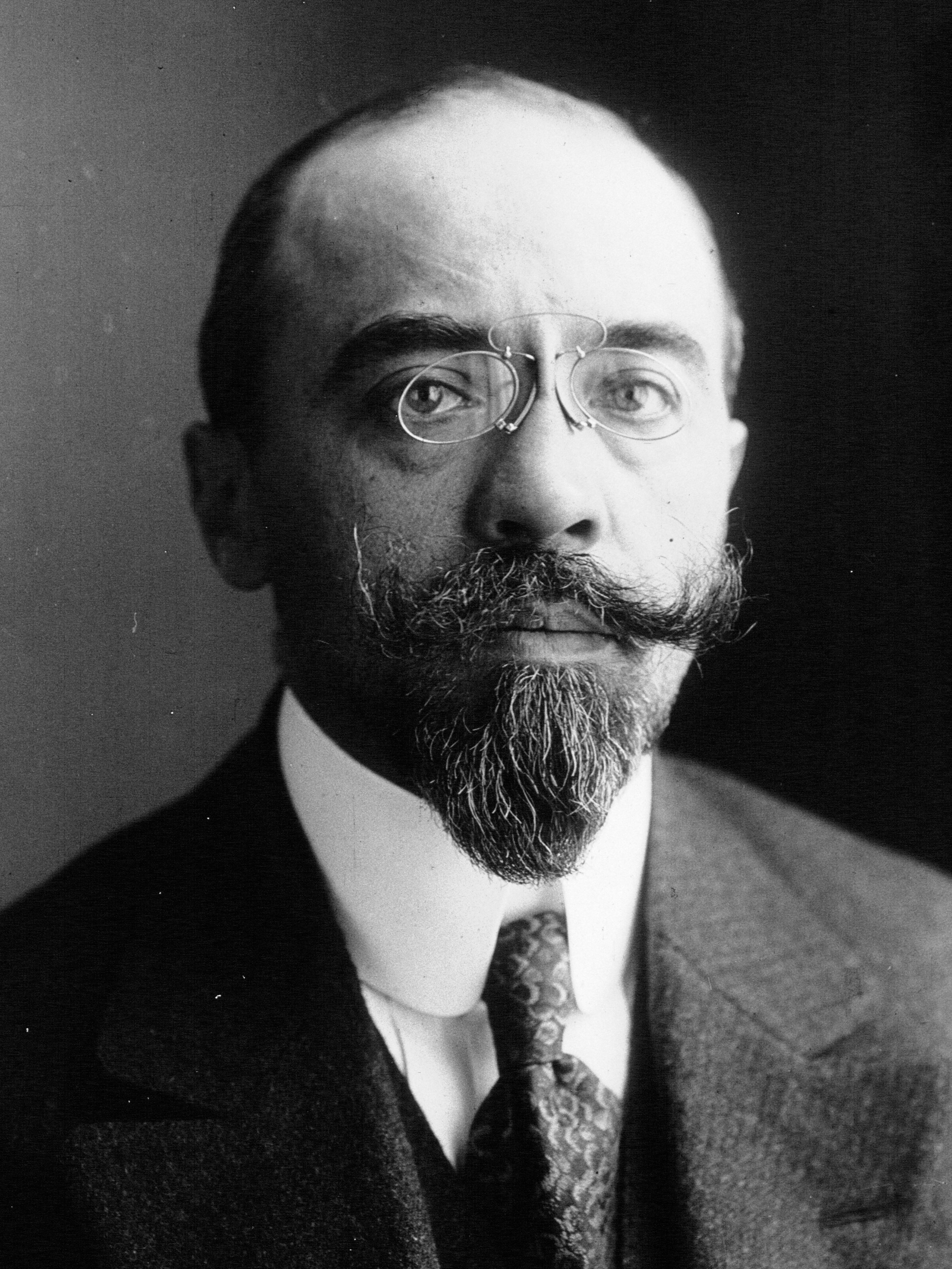
Sarraut in 1914

He was Governor-General of French Indochina, from 1912 to 1914 and from 1917 to 1919. Although Sarraut was celebrated for native education reform, his motivation was an example of paternalism. He believed that the Vietnamese could not be civilized until their thinking, customs and institutions mirrored those of the French. According to Hue Tam Ho Tai, if Sarraut's argument was carried to its logical conclusion, the Vietnamese, she writes, would "deserve independence from French rule only when they no longer desired to be Vietnamese, but Frenchmen in yellow skin." Albert Sarraut supported actively the preservation and development of native arts, for instance supporting the French art scholar George Groslier in preserving Cambodian arts and cultural traditions, and funding the design and construction of the National Museum of Cambodia. On 18 January 1920 he replaced Henry Simon as Minister of the Colonies.

Acting as Minister of the Interior for the Édouard Daladier run government, Sarrault became increasingly concerned with what he considered a flood of Spanish refugees fleeing the Francoist regime during the Spanish Civil War. In April 1938 Sarrault released a statement calling for the "methodical, energetic and prompt action to rid our country of the too numerous undesirable elements".

On 10 July 1940, Sarraut voted in favour of granting the Cabinet presided over by Marshal Philippe Pétain authority to draw up a new constitution, thereby effectively ending the French Third Republic and establishing Vichy France. Thereafter Sarraut retired from politics. He took control of the family newspaper, La Dépêche de Toulouse, after the editor, his brother Maurice Sarraut, was killed by the Milice in 1943.

Sarraut died in Paris on 26 November 1962. The Lycée Albert Sarraut in Hanoi was named after him.

== Sarraut's First Ministry, 26 October – 26 November 1933 ==
- Albert Sarraut – President of the Council and Minister of Marine
- Albert Dalimier – Vice President of the Council and Minister of Justice
- Joseph Paul-Boncour – Minister of Foreign Affairs
- Édouard Daladier – Minister of War
- Camille Chautemps – Minister of the Interior
- Georges Bonnet – Minister of Finance
- Abel Gardey – Minister of Budget
- Eugène Frot – Minister of Labour and Social Security Provisions
- Jacques Stern – Minister of Merchant Marine
- Pierre Cot – Minister of Air
- Anatole de Monzie – Minister of National Education
- Hippolyte Ducos – Minister of Pensions
- Henri Queuille – Minister of Agriculture
- François Piétri – Minister of Colonies
- Joseph Paganon – Minister of Public Works
- Émile Lisbonne – Minister of Public Health
- Jean Mistler – Minister of Posts, Telegraphs, and Telephones
- Laurent Eynac – Minister of Commerce and Industry

== Sarraut's Second Ministry, 24 January – 4 June 1936 ==
- Albert Sarraut – President of the Council and Minister of the Interior
- Pierre Étienne Flandin – Minister of Foreign Affairs
- Louis Maurin – Minister of War
- Marcel Régnier – Minister of Finance
- Ludovic-Oscar Frossard – Minister of Labour
- Léon Bérard – Minister of Justice
- François Piétri – Minister of Marine
- Louis de Chappedelaine – Minister of Merchant Marine
- Marcel Déat – Minister of Air
- Henri Guernut – Minister of National Education
- René Besse – Minister of Pensions
- Paul Thellier – Minister of Agriculture
- Jacques Stern – Minister of Colonies
- Camille Chautemps – Minister of Public Works
- Louis Nicolle – Minister of Public Health and Physical Education
- Georges Mandel – Minister of Posts, Telegraphs, and Telephones
- Georges Bonnet – Minister of Commerce and Industry
- Joseph Paul-Boncour – Minister of State and Permanent Delegate to the League of Nations

== Sources ==
- Bon, Nicolas, "Midi 1907, l'histoire d'une révolte vigneronne", vin-terre-net.com (in French), archived from the original on 30 November 2010
- Castillon, René (19 June 2007), "Le 19 juin 1907, la crise de la viticulture languedocienne débouche...", La Vie (in French)
- Ferré, Georges (March 2007), "Le Midi viticole, rouge de colère", historia.fr (in French)

Political offices
Preceded by Édouard Daladier	Prime Ministers of France; 1933	Succeeded by Camille Chautemps
Preceded by Pierre Laval	Prime Ministers of France; 1936	Succeeded by Léon Blum
