= Albert Peyronnet =

French politician

Albert Pierre Camille Peyronnet
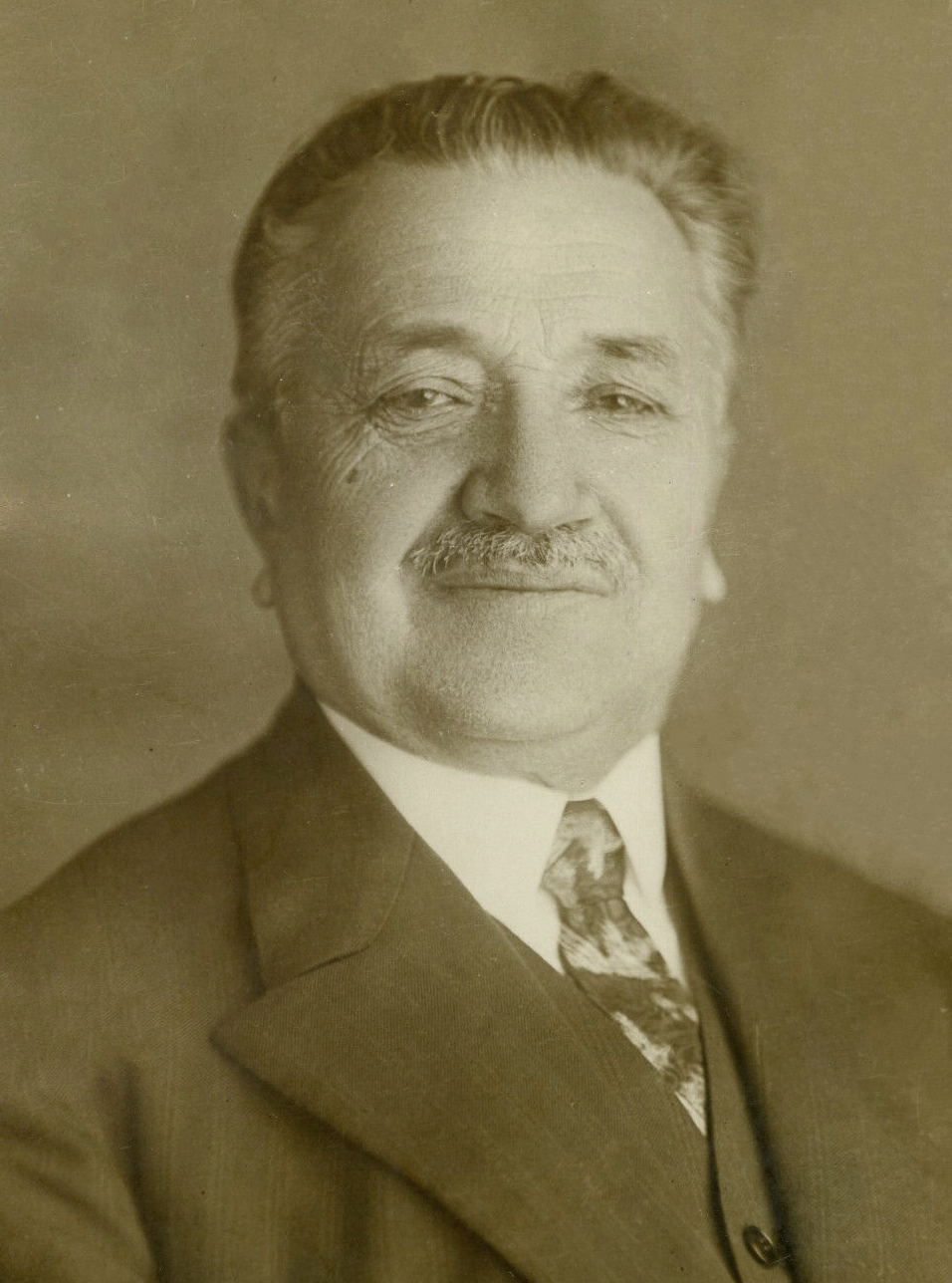
- Peyronnet in 1932

Minister of Labor
- In office 15 January 1922 – 29 March 1924
- Preceded by: Charles Daniel-Vincent
- Succeeded by: Charles Daniel-Vincent

Personal details
- Born: 5 January 1862 Brest, Finistère, France
- Died: 18 December 1958 (aged 96) Nice, France

Albert Pierre Camille Peyronnet (5 January 1862 – 18 December 1958) was a French politician who was a senator from 1912 to 1945 and Minister of Labor in 1922–24.

== Life ==
Albert Pierre Camille Peyronnet was born on 5 January 1862 in Brest, Finistère. His father was a secondary school principal, who soon moved to the lycée of Montluçon. From there Peyronnet went on to study at the faculty of law in Paris, the School of Political Science and the School of Business and Economics. He became an advocate in Cosne-sur-Loire, a magistrate in Paris, and then an advocate in Paris. He was deputy chief of staff of René Viviani, Minister of Labor from 1906 to 1908, then Viviani's chief of staff until 1909. He was chief of staff of Louis Puech, Minister of Public Works, Posts and Telegraphs from 1910 to 1911, then chief of staff of Ernest Monis, Minister of Worship in March–June 1911.

Peyronnet was elected senator for the Allier on 7 January 1912, and was reelected in 1921, 1929 and 1938. He joined the Democratic Left group. He was vice-president of the Senate from January 1925 to January 1929. He was appointed Minister of Labor in the 2nd cabinet of Raymond Poincaré from 15 January 1922 to 29 March 1924. He supported shorter working days in return for the gains in efficiency that were assumed to result. He claimed that the eight-hour day led "to suburbanization, the increase of workers' gardens, greater attendance at professional courses and libraries, and the decline of alcoholism."

On 10 July 1940, he voted in favour of granting the cabinet presided by Marchal Philippe Pétain authority to draw up a new constitution, thereby effectively ending the French Third Republic and establishing Vichy France. He then retired from public life. He died on 18 December 1958 in Nice at the age of 96.

== Publications ==
- Peyronnet's book Ministère du Travail 1906–1923 was crowned by the Academy of Moral and Political Sciences.
- Albert Peyronnet (1924), Le Ministère du travail, 1906-1923 (in French), Nancy; Paris; Strasbourg: Impr.-libr. Berger-Levrault
