= Pierre Colliard =

French politician

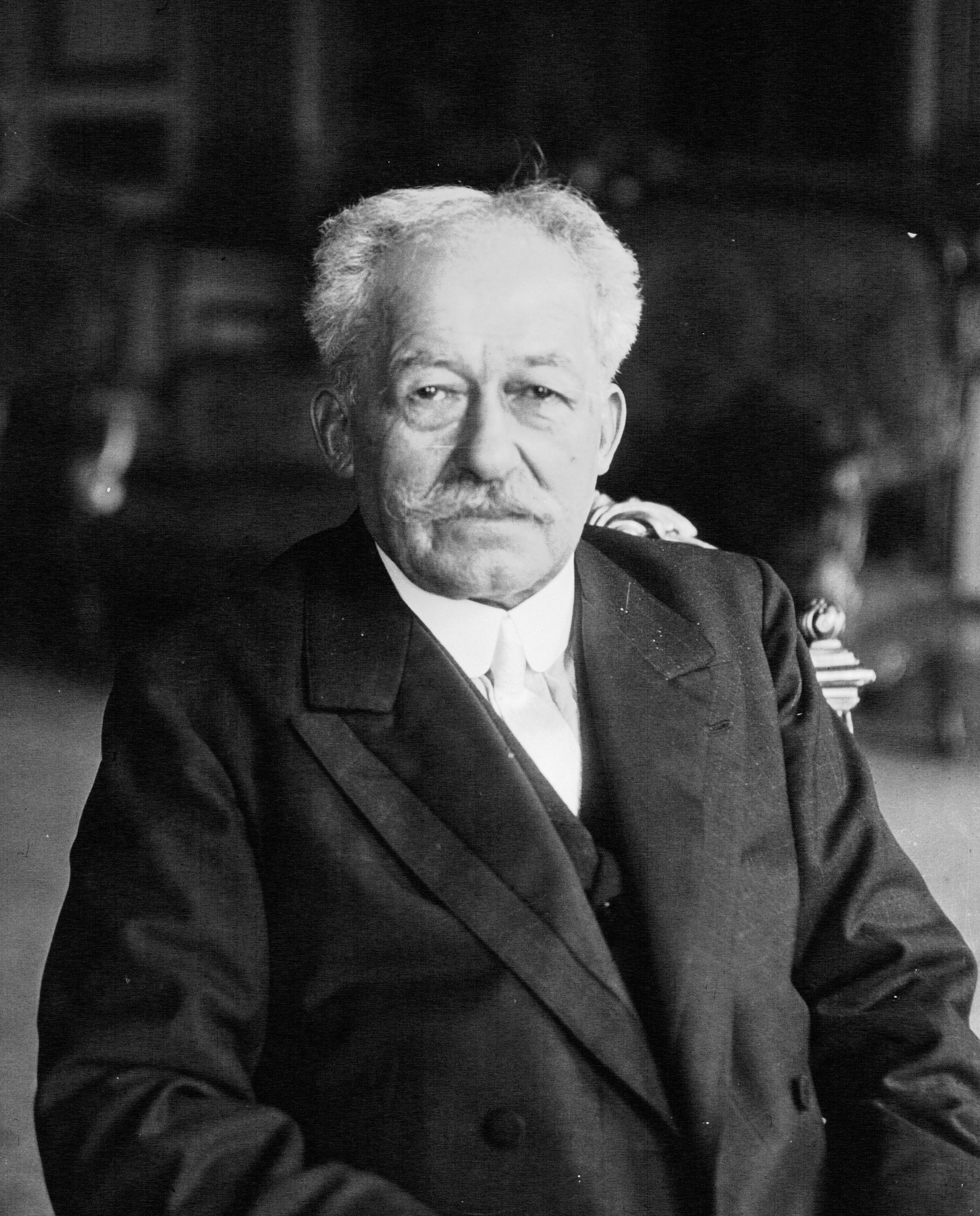
Pierre Colliard in 1917

Pierre Colliard (30 April 1852, Jons – 19 May 1925) was a French politician belonging to the Republican-Socialist Party. He was a member of the Chamber of Deputies from 1898 to 1919. He was Minister of Labour and Social Security provisions from 1917 to 1919.
