= Louis Lafferre =

French politician

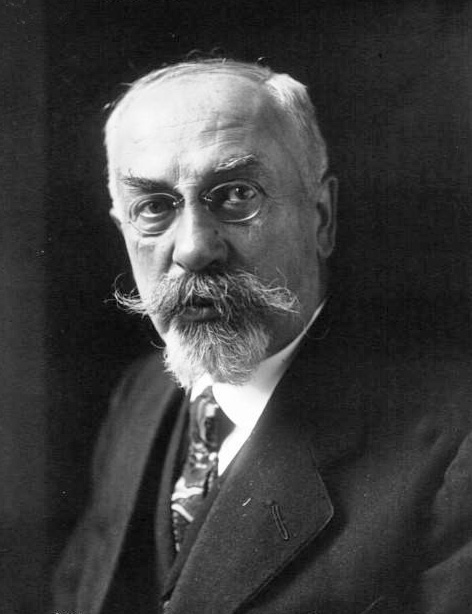
Lafferre in 1920

Louis Lafferre (10 May 1861 – 28 February 1929) was a French politician. He belonged to the Radical Party.

Lafferre was born in Pau, Pyrénées-Atlantiques, and began his political career as a local councillor in Narbonne. He was a member of the Chamber of Deputies from 1898 to 1919 and a Senator from 1920 to 1924. He was Minister of Labour and Social Security Provisions from 1910 to 1911 and Minister of Public Instruction from 1917 to 1919. On 3 July 1905 he voted in favour of the Law on the Separation of the Churches and the State.
