= Jacques Stern (politician) =

French banker and politician

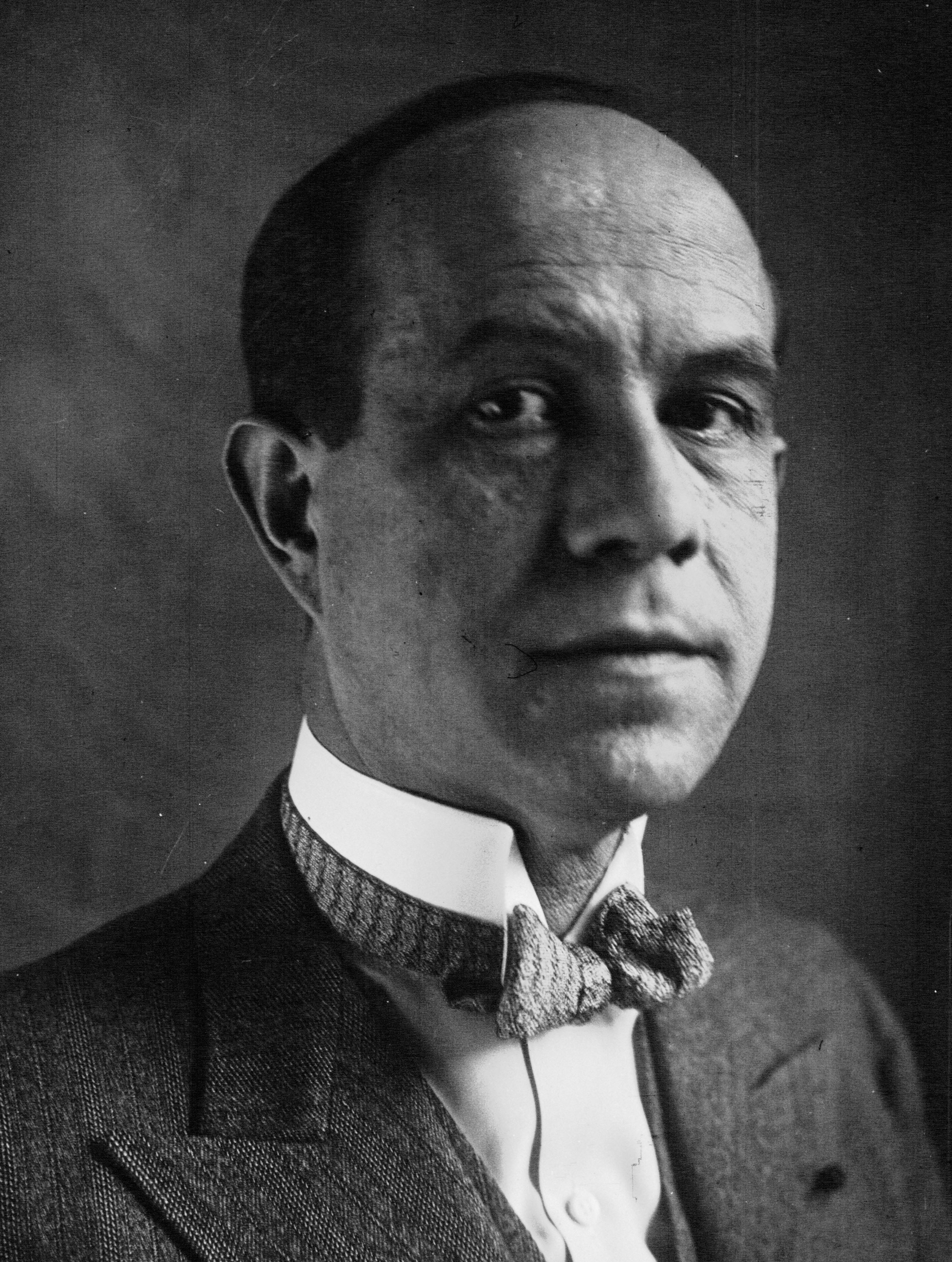
- Stern in 1932

Minister of the Merchant Marine
- In office 26 October 1933 – 26 November 1933
- Prime Minister: Albert Sarraut
- Preceded by: Eugène Frot
- Succeeded by: Eugène Frot

Minister of the Colonies
- In office 24 January 1936 – 4 June 1936
- Prime Minister: Albert Sarraut
- Preceded by: Louis Rollin
- Succeeded by: Marius Moutet

Personal details
- Born: 14 April 1882 Paris, France
- Died: 21 December 1949 (aged 67) New York City, United States

Jacques Stern (14 April 1882 – 21 December 1949) was a wealthy French banker, politician and a member of the Stern banking family. He was Minister of Merchant Marine in 1933 and Minister of the Colonies in 1936. While in exile in the United States during World War II (1939–45) he wrote a passionate defense of France's colonial mission.

== Early years (1882–1914) ==
Jacques Stern was born on 14 April 1882 in Paris. He was a banker, owner of a racing stable, and one of the wealthiest members of Paris society in the period before World War I (1914–18). He was president of the Southern Railway Company (Compagnie des chemins de fer du Sud de la France). His wife was Simone de Leusse.

== Political career (1914–40) ==
Stern was interested in a political career, and assisted the cabinet of Léon Bourgeois. He was elected to the general council of the Basses-Alpes department. Stern ran for election to the legislature in April–May 1914 for the Castellane district, and was elected in the second round. He replaced François Deloncle. He was a deputy for this district of Basses-Alpes from 10 May 1914 to 7 December 1919, sitting with the Radical Left. He sat on various committees, and was mainly interested in issues of finance and communications. He ran for reelection in 1919 and 1924 but was defeated both times.

In 1928 Stern ran on the Left Republican list for the Digne district and was elected in the first round. He was deputy for this district of Basses-Alpes from 22 April 1928 to 31 May 1932, sitting with the Left Republicans. He was in turn a member of the committees of the Army (1928), of Foreign Affairs (1929) and of the Navy (1931). He was under-secretary of state for the Navy from 23 December 1930 to 27 June 1931. Stern was reelected deputy for Basses-Alpes from 8 April 1932 to 31 May 1936. He was Minister of the Merchant Marine from 26 October 1933 to 26 November 1933. He was Minister of the Colonies from 24 January 1936 to 4 June 1936. He was defeated in the 1936 elections.

== Exile (1940–49) ==
After the outbreak of World War II (1939–45), Stern escaped from France with his family. After getting their visas from Aristides de Sousa Mendes, the Portuguese consul in Bordeaux, the family fled to Portugal. They settled in Estoril, at both the Hotel do Parque and the Hotel Atlântico, between 8 August and 1 September 1940. A few days later, on 4 September, they left Portugal aboard the S.S. Excambion headed for New York City, arriving on 13 September. Stern took refuge in the United States. He found a position at Princeton University. While there he wrote a book that defended France's colonial history (Les colonies françaises, passé et avenir (1943), in which he asserted that France's role had always been to free the peoples from despotic rule and raise them to a higher level of civilization. According to Stern,

Down the centuries, the peoples of Syria, Lebanon, and Egypt, have repeatedly called upon the French and the British to help them, to free them from the Turkish yoke, from an inferno in which the only civilizing influence, from the time of the Crusades, was the French religious orders and their educational institutions. What the French and British administration brought was order, freedom, honest finance, railroads, public works and hygiene, not through brutal assimilationist methods, but with full consideration for native beliefs and traditions...

Stern wanted to bind together the 40 million Frenchmen in Europe and the 60 million White and "Colored" Frenchmen overseas by transforming the colonial people into Frenchmen. Stern said that there was no racial discrimination in the colonies, and the unknown soldier under the Arc de Triomphe might even be a colored Frenchman. He wrote that "The gratitude and loyalty of the children of France's empire would never fail her, not even after her defeat."

Jacques Stern died in New York City on 21 December 1949.

== Publications ==
- Stern, Jacques (1943). Les colonies françaises, passé et avenir. New York: Brentano's.
- Stern, Jacques (1944). The French colonies, past and future. New York: Didier.

== Sources ==
- Crowder, Michael (2013-01-11). Colonial West Africa: Collected Essays. Routledge. ISBN 978-1-135-78139-2.
- "Jacques STERN (mandats)". Sycomore (in French). Assemblée nationale.
- Jolly, Jean (1960–1977). "Stern (Jacques)". Dictionnaire des parlementaires français; notices biographiques sur les ministres, députés et sénateurs français de 1889 à 1940 (in French). Paris: Presses universitaires de France. ISBN 2-1100-1998-0.
- Jolly, Jean, ed. (1960b), "Deloncle (Antoine-Benoît-François)", Dictionnaire des parlementaires français de 1889 à 1940, Presses universitaires de France
- Njoh, Ambe (2007-01-24). Planning Power: Town Planning and Social Control in Colonial Africa. CRC Press. ISBN 978-1-135-39160-7.
- Schumann, Christoph (2008). Liberal Thought in the Eastern Mediterranean: Late 19th Century Until the 1960s. BRILL. ISBN 978-90-04-16548-9.
