= Justin Godart =

French politician (1871–1956)

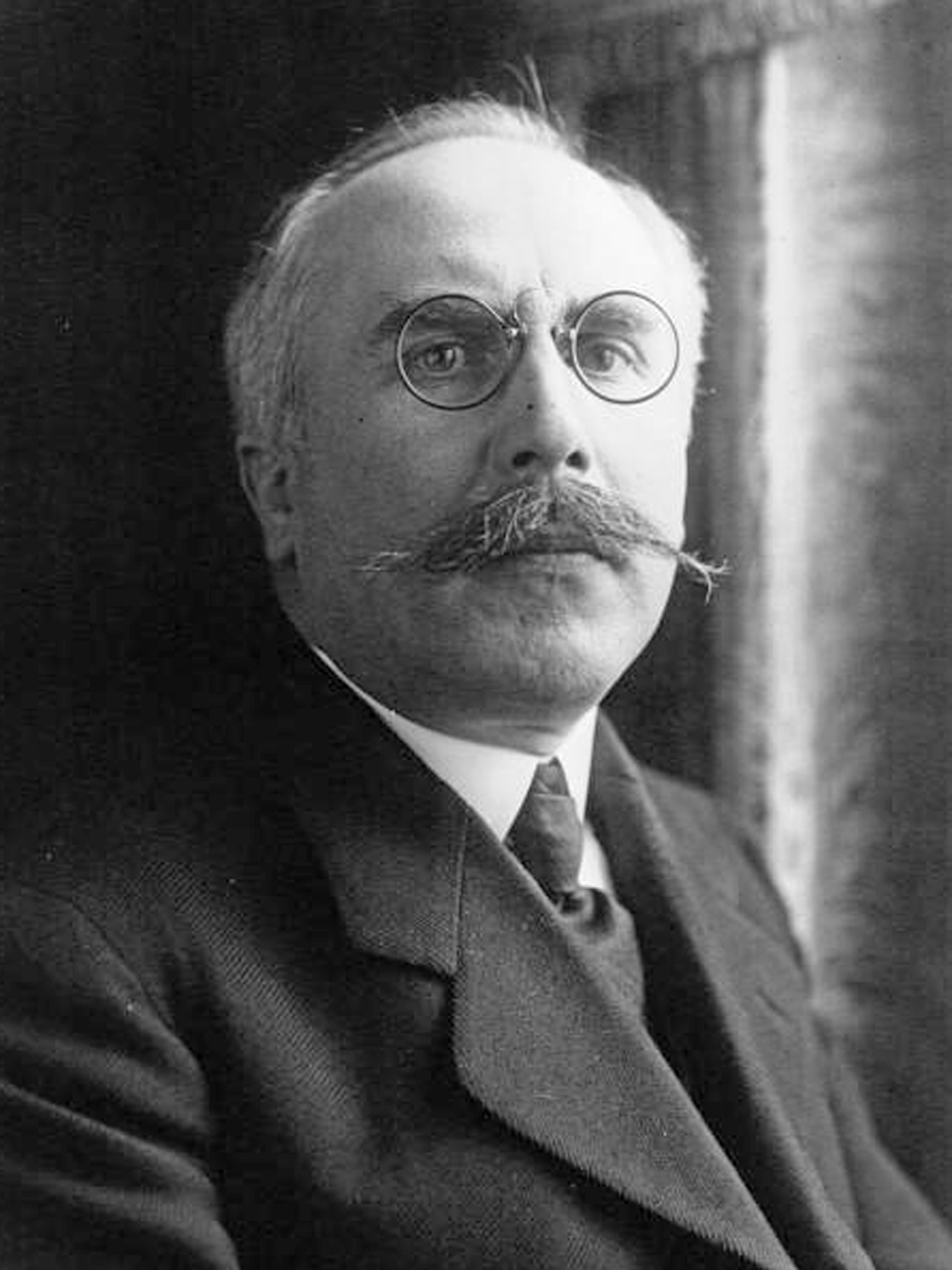
Justin Godart in 1917

François Pierre Marie Justin Godart (26 November 1871 – 13 December 1956) was a French lawyer and politician who served as the Minister for Health from 3 June 1932 to 18 December 1932.

== Biography ==
Justin Godart was born into a working-class family in Lyon on 26 November 1871. Godart was educated at the Collège-lycée Ampère and gained a Doctor of Law there. In 1904, Godart was elected the sixth deputy mayor of Lyon as a member of the Radical Party. In 1906, Godart became a Deputy of the French National Assembly, representing Lyon.

From 1915 to 1918, Godart served as the Undersecretary of State for War in charge of the armed forces medical service. When Édouard Herriot became Prime Minister of France in 1924, Godart was appointed as the Minister for Labour, Hygiene, Welfare Work, and Social Security Provisions. Godart's time in this position came to an end with Herriot's ouster the next year. In 1926, Godart became a Senator, representing the department of Rhone. In 1932, Godart became the Minister of Public Health, again under Herriot. However, Godart did not remain in this position for long, as Herriot again lost power that December.

On 10 July 1940 Godart joined the Vichy 80, a collection of French parliamentarians who unsuccessfully voted against a constitutional amendment dissolving the Third Republic and giving Philippe Pétain the power to establish a new authoritarian state, now known as Vichy France. During World War II, Godart was involved in Resistance activities, editing an anti-Vichy newspaper. Upon Lyon's liberation by Allied forces in September 1944, he became the interim Mayor of Lyon. In 1945, Godart resigned from the Radical Party.

After his political career, Godart continued to play an active role in campaigning for improved labour conditions, such as the eight-hour day. Until 1950, Godart represented France in the International Labour Organization. He died in Paris on 12 December 1956. In 2004, Israel conferred the Righteous among the Nations honorific upon Godart for his services to Jews during the Holocaust.

== Bibliography ==
- La plaisante sagesse lyonnaise / Adages and moral reflections by Catherin Bugnard
- Travailleurs et métiers lyonnais, 1909
- Laurent Mourguet et Guignol, 1912
- La révolution de 1830 à Lyon, 1930
- Le jansénisme à Lyon, 1934, library Félix Alcan
- Les Voraces à Lyon en 1848, 1948
