= Joseph Garat =

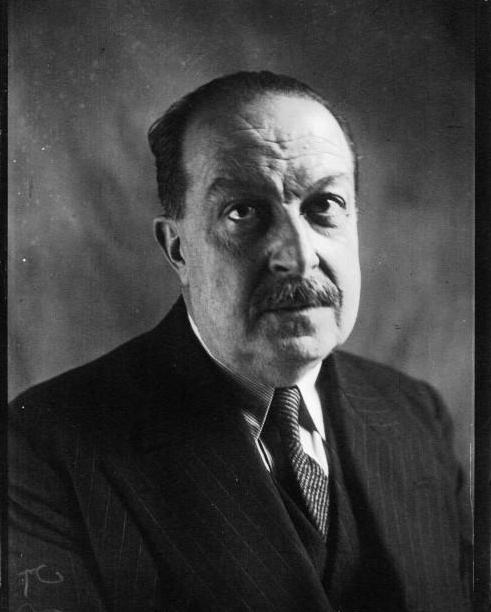
Joseph Garat.

Joseph Garat (31 December 1872, Bayonne - December 1944, Bayonne) was a former mayor of Bayonne. He is known for being implicated in the Stavisky Affair.

== Life ==
A doctor in law, with a diploma from the École libre des sciences politiques in Paris, Joseph Garat practised as a lawyer until 1910, when he was elected a deputy and gave up practising law. A conseiller municipal of Bayonne from 1900, he was elected the town's mayor in 1908. Thus began the city's "first Garatist era", then he was re-elected mayor in 1912 and deputy in 1914. He was also elected a conseiller général in 1909, 1910 and 1928.

Garat retired from politics and between 1919 and 1924 worked in a, dans un "cabinet d'affaires" in Paris. He re-took his seat as a deputy in May 1924, then became mayor of Bayonne again in 1925, thus beginning the "second Garatist era". He won all the elections - he was re-elected as deputy in 1928 and 1932, and as mayor in 1929. I

In 1933 he was implicated in the Stavisky Affair. Imprisoned in Bayonne in January 1934, he was dismissed as mayor and conseiller municipal. The Radical Party decided on his exclusion in March 1934. At his trial in 1936, he was charged with lying in public writings and complicity in embezzlement and fraud. In effect, he was president of the Conseil d'administration of the Crédit municipal de Bayonne, an organisation founded by the notorious fraudster Stavisky, who was the originator of the scandal, which had allowed the misappropriation of tens of millions of francs. Garat was condemned to two years in prison. The Stavisky affair having marked his political death, he died in Bayonne in 1944, forgotten despite his important political career.

== Bibliography ==
- Claude Duhau, Maires et édiles de Bayonne (1831-2001), Éditions Claude Duhau, Bayonne, 1999
- Jean-Claude Larronde, Un siècle d'élections municipales à Bayonne, 1983
- Louis Noguères, Plaidoirie pour M. Joseph Garat: l'affaire Stavisky, Pau, Marrimpouey jeune, 1936
