= Eugène Penancier =

French politician

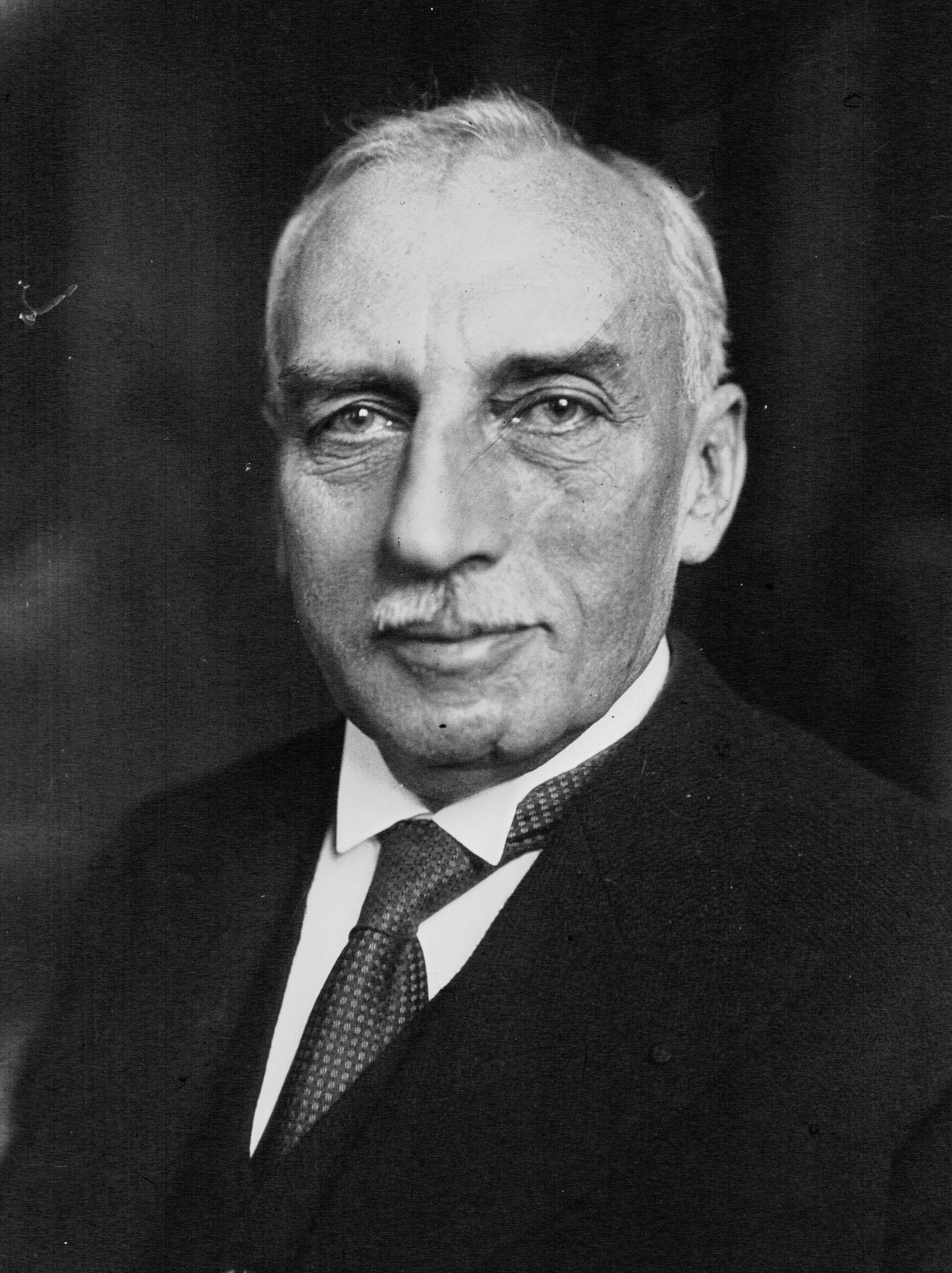
Eugène Penancier

Eugène Penancier (French pronunciation: [øʒɛn pənɑ̃sje]; 24 February 1873 – 4 July 1955) was a French politician. The first Deputy Prime Minister of France, he also served as Minister of Justice in the 1930s. He was born in Bray-sur-Seine and graduated from the University of Paris in 1897; his thesis was entitled Des Défauts et des périls de la législation actuelle sur les pensions de retraites civiles et des projets de réforme présentés jusqu'à ce jour. During his career he served as mayor of his birthplace, and was a Senator from Seine-et-Marne from 1920 until 1936. He was Justice Minister from January 31 to October 26, 1933, and again from January 30 to February 9, 1934, both under Édouard Daladier. A street in Bray-sur-Seine bears his name.
