= Minister of Health (France) =

Cabinet position in France

Minister of Health, Families, Autonomy, and Disabled people
- Ministre de la Santé, des Familles, de l’Autonomie et des Personnes handicapées
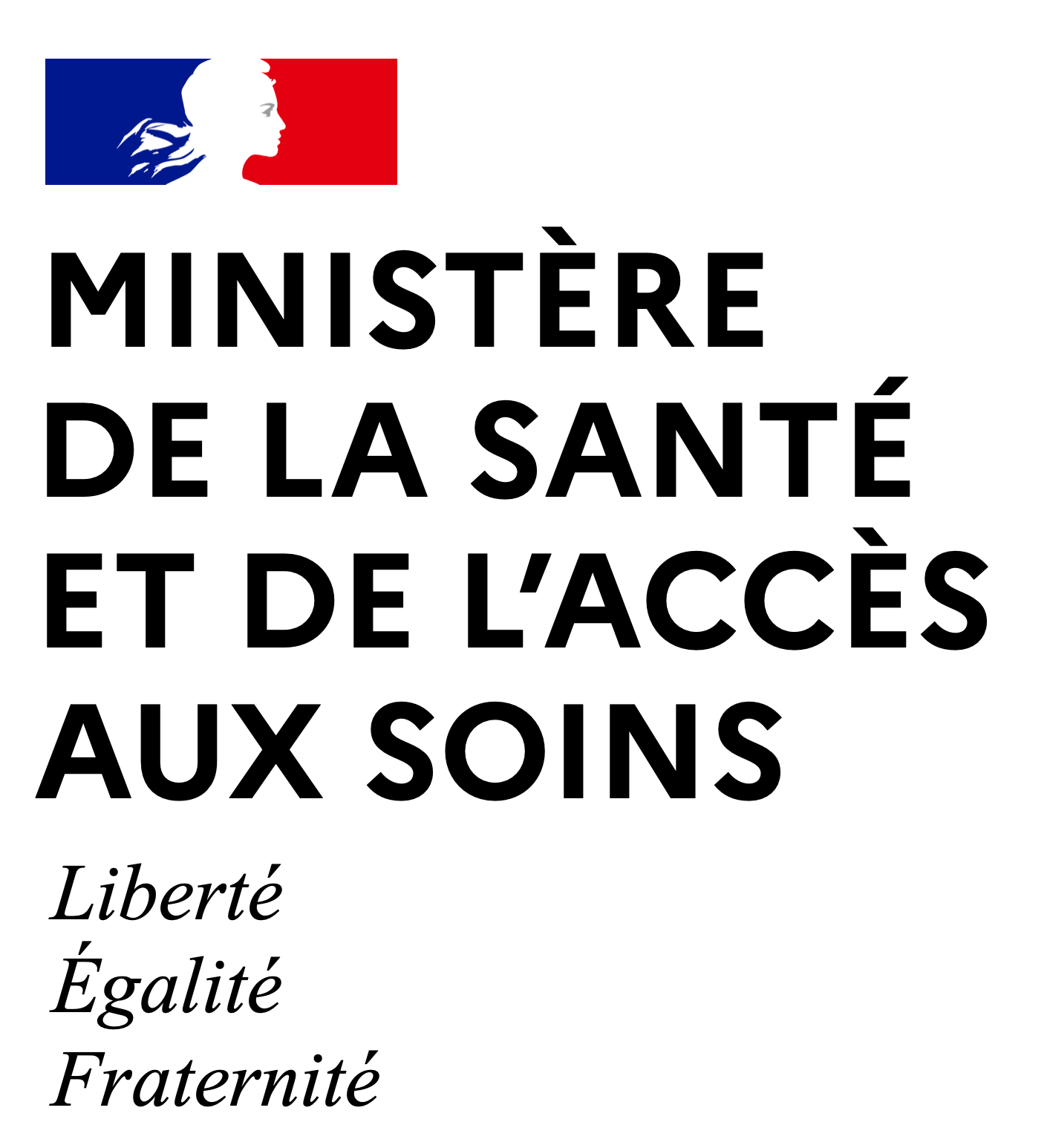
- Incumbent; Stéphanie Rist since 12 October 2025
- Ministry of Solidarity and Health
- Member of: Cabinet
- Reports to: President of the Republic; Prime Minister
- Seat: 14 Avenue Duquesne, Paris, France
- Nominator: Prime Minister
- Appointer: President of the Republic
- Term length: No fixed term
- Formation: 1921

Minister of Health, Families, Autonomy, and Disabled people is a cabinet position in the Government of France. The health portfolio oversees the health care public services and the health insurance part of the French Social Security. As French ministerial departments are not fixed and depend on the Prime Minister's choice, the Minister sometimes also has one or some of other portfolios among Work, Pensions, Family, the Elderly, Handicapped people and Women's Rights. In that case, they are helped by one or some junior Minister focusing on one part of the portfolio. The current Minister is Stéphanie Rist.

== Ministers of Health ==
Portrait	Name	Title	Prime Minister	Start	End	Notes	Refs
	Georges Leredu	Minister of Hygiene, Social Assistance and Welfare	Briand	16 January 1921	15 January 1922		
	Paul Strauss	Minister of Hygiene, Social Assistance and Welfare	Poincaré	15 January 1922	29 March 1924		
	Daniel Vincent	Minister of Labour and Hygiene	Poincaré	29 March 1924	9 June 1924		
	Paul Jourdain	Minister of Labour and Hygiene	François-Marsal	9 June 1924	14 June 1924		
	Justin Godart	Minister of Labour, Hygiene, and Social Welfare	Herriot	14 June 1924	17 April 1925		
	Antoine Durafour	Minister of Labour, Hygiene, and Social Welfare	Painlevé (until November 1925); Briand (from November 1925)	17 April 1925	17 July 1926		
	Louis Pasquet	Minister of Labour, Hygiene, and Social Welfare	Herriot	19 July 1926	23 July 1926		
	André Fallières	Minister of Labour, Hygiene, and Social Welfare	Poincaré	23 July 1926	1 June 1928		
	Louis Loucheur	Minister of Labour, Hygiene, and Social Welfare	Poincaré (until July 1929); Briand (July to October 1929); Tardieu (November 1929 to February 1930); Chautemps (from February 1930)	11 November 1928	2 March 1930		
	Désiré Ferry	Minister of Public Health	Tardieu	2 March 1930	13 December 1930		
	Henri Queuille	Minister of Public Health	Steeg	13 December 1930	27 January 1931		
	Camille Blaisot	Minister of Public Health	Laval (until February 1932); Tardieu (from February 1932)	27 January 1931	3 June 1932		
	Justin Godart	Minister of Public Health	Herriot	3 June 1932	18 December 1932		
	Charles Daniélou	Minister of Public Health	Paul-Boncour (until January 1933); Daladier (from January 1933)	18 December 1932	26 October 1933		
	Émile Lisbonne	Minister of Public Health	Sarraut	26 October 1933	26 November 1933		
	Alexandre Israël	Minister of Public Health	Chautemps	26 November 1933	30 January 1934		
	Émile Lisbonne	Minister of Public Health	Daladier	30 January 1934	9 February 1934		
	Louis Marin	Minister of Public Health and Physical Education	Doumergue	9 February 1934	8 November 1934		
	Henri Queuille	Minister of Public Health and Physical Education	Flandin	8 November 1934	1 June 1935		
	Louis Lafont	Minister of Public Health and Physical Education	Bouisson (to 7 June 1935); Laval (from 7 June 1935)	1 June 1935	24 January 1936		
	Louis Nicolle	Minister of Public Health and Physical Education	Sarraut	24 January 1936	4 June 1936		
	Henri Sellier	Minister of Public Health	Blum	4 June 1936	22 June 1937		
	Marc Rucart	Minister of Public Health	Chautemps	22 June 1937	13 March 1938		
	Fernand Gentin	Minister of Public Health	Blum	13 March 1938	10 April 1938		
	Marc Rucart	Minister of Public Health	Daladier	10 April 1938	21 March 1940		
	Marcel Héraud	Minister of Public Health	Reynaud	21 March 1940	5 June 1940		
	Georges Pernot	French Minister for Family Affairs and Public Health	Reynaud	5 June 1940	16 June 1940		
	Jean Ybarnégaray	French Minister for Veterans and Family Affairs	Pétain	16 June 1940	12 July 1940		
	Serge Huard	Secretary General for Health	Laval	16 July 1940	13 December 1940	With Jean Ybarnégaray as Secretary of State for Family and Youth	
	Serge Huard	Secretary General for Family and Health	Flandin	14 December 1940	9 February 1941		
	Jacques Chevalier	Secretary of State for Family and Health	Darlan	25 February 1941	12 August 1941		
	Louis Aublant	Secretary General for Family and Health	Darlan	12 August 1941	18 April 1942	With Serge Huard as Secretary of State for Family and Health	
	Louis Aublant	Secretary-General for Health	Laval	18 April 1942	17 December 1943	With Raymond Grasset as Minister of Family and Health	
	Raymond Grasset	Minister of Family and Health	Laval	17 December 1943	20 August 1944		
	Jules Abadie	Commissioner for Justice, National Education and Public Health	Laval	7 June 1943	4 September 1943		
	Jules Abadie	Commissioner for National Education and Public Health	Laval	4 September 1943	9 November 1943		
	Adrien Tixier	Commissioner for Social Affairs	Laval (until June 1944) de Gaulle (after June 1944)	9 November 1943	26 August 1944		
	Adrien Tixier	Commissioner for Social Affairs	de Gaulle	26 August 1944	10 September 1944	With Louis Pasteur Vallery-Radot as Secretary General for Health	
	François Billoux	Minister of Public Health	de Gaulle	10 September 1944	21 November 1945		
	Robert Prigent	Minister of Population	de Gaulle	21 November 1945	26 January 1946		
	Robert Prigent	Minister of Public Health and Population	Gouin	26 January 1946	24 June 1946		
	Robert Prigent	Minister of Population	Bidault (to November 1946); Auriol (from November 1946)	24 June 1946	16 December 1946		
	René Arthaud	Minister of Public Health	Bidault (to November 1946); Auriol (from November 1946)	24 June 1946	16 December 1946		
	Pierre Ségelle	Minister of Public Health and Population	Blum	16 December 1946	22 January 1947		
	Georges Marrane	Minister of Public Health and Population	Ramadier	22 January 1947	4 May 1947		
	Marcel Roclore	Minister of Public Health and Population	Ramadier	4 May 1947	9 May 1947		
	Robert Prigent	Minister of Public Health and Population	Ramadier	9 May 1947	22 October 1947		
None							
	Germaine Poinso-Chapuis	Minister of Public Health and Population	Schuman	24 November 1947	26 July 1948		
	Pierre Schneiter	Minister of Public Health and Population	Marie (to 2 September 1948); Schuman (September 1948); Queuille (September 1948 to October 1949); Bidault (October 1949 to July 1950); Queuille (July 1950); Pleven (July 1950 to March 1951); Queuille (from March 1951)	26 July 1948	11 August 1951		
	Paul Ribeyre	Minister of Public Health and Population	Pleven (to January 1952); Faure (January to March 1952); Pinay (from March 1952)	11 August 1951	8 January 1953		
	André Boutemy	Minister of Public Health and Population	Mayer	8 January 1953	9 February 1953		
	Paul Ribeyre	Minister of Public Health and Population	Mayer	11 February 1953	28 June 1953		
	Paul Coste-Floret	Minister of Public Health and Population	Laniel	28 June 1953	19 June 1954		
	Louis-Paul Aujoulat	Minister of Public Health and Population	Mendès France	19 June 1954	3 September 1954		
	André Monteil	Minister of Public Health and Population	Mendès France	3 September 1954	23 February 1955		
	Bernard Lafay	Minister of Public Health and Population	Faure	23 February 1955	1 February 1956		
None (under the supervision of the Ministry of Social Affairs)							
	Félix Houphouët-Boigny	Minister of Public Health and Population	Galliard	6 November 1957	14 May 1958		
	André Maroselli	Minister of Public Health and Population	Pfimlin	14 May 1958	1 June 1958		
	Bernard Chenot	Minister of Public Health and Population	de Gaulle (to January 1959); Debré (from January 1959)	7 July 1958	24 August 1961		
	Joseph Fontanet	Minister of Public Health and Population	Debré	24 August 1961	15 May 1962		
	Raymond Marcellin	Minister of Public Health and Population	Pompidou	15 May 1962	20 June 1966		
None (under the supervision of the Ministry of Social Affairs)							
	Robert Boulin	Minister of Public Health and Social Security	Chaban-Delmas	22 June 1969	6 July 1972		
	Jean Foyer	Minister of Public Health	Messmer	6 July 1972	5 April 1973		
	Michel Poniatowski	Minister of Public Health and Social Security	Messmer	5 April 1973	27 May 1974		
	Simone Veil	Minister of Health	Chirac (until August 1976); Barre (from August 1976)	27 May 1974	30 March 1977		
	Simone Veil	Minister of Health and Social Security	Barre	30 March 1977	5 April 1978		
	Simone Veil	Minister of Health and Family	Barre	5 April 1978	4 July 1979		
	Jacques Barrot	Minister of Health and Social Security	Barre	4 July 1979	21 May 1981		
	Edmond Hervé	Minister of Health	Mauroy	21 May 1981	22 June 1981		
	Jack Ralite	Minister of Health	Mauroy	22 June 1981	22 March 1983		
	Pierre Bérégovoy	Minister of Social Affairs and National Solidarity	Mauroy	24 March 1983	23 July 1984	Edmond Hervé as Secretary of State for Health	
	Georgina Dufoix	Minister of Social Affairs and National Solidarity	Fabius	23 July 1984	20 March 1986	Edmond Hervé as Secretary of State for Health	
	Philippe Séguin	Minister of Social Affairs and Employment	Chirac	25 March 1986	12 May 1988	Michèle Barzach as Minister Delegate for Health and Family	
	Michel Delebarre	Minister of Social Affairs and Employment	Rocard	12 May 1988	28 June 1988	Claude Évin as Minister Delegate for Health and Social Protection	
	Claude Évin	Minister of Solidarity, Health and Social Protection	Rocard	28 June 1988	8 July 1988	Léon Schwartzenberg as Minister Delegate in charge of Health	
	Claude Évin	Minister of Solidarity, Health and Social Protection	Rocard	8 July 1988	2 October 1990		
	Claude Évin	Minister of Social Affairs and Solidarity	Rocard	2 October 1990	16 May 1991	Bruno Durieux as Minister Delegate in charge of Health	
	Jean-Louis Bianco	Minister of Social Affairs and Integration	Cresson	16 May 1991	4 April 1992	Bruno Durieux as Minister Delegate in charge of Health	
	Bernard Kouchner	Minister of Health and Humanitarian Action	Bérégovoy	2 April 1992	29 March 1993		
	Simone Veil	Minister of State, Minister of Social Affairs, Health and Urban Development	Balladur	29 March 1993	18 May 1995	Philippe Douste-Blazy as Minister Delegate for Health	
	Élisabeth Hubert	Minister of Public Health and Health Insurance	Juppé	18 May 1995	7 November 1995		
	Jacques Barrot	Minister of Labour and Social Affairs	Juppé	7 November 1995	4 June 1997	Hervé Gaymard as Secretary of State for Health and Social Security	
	Martine Aubry	Minister of Employment and Solidarity	Jospin	4 June 1997	18 October 2000	With Bernard Koucher as Secretary of State for Health	
	Martine Aubry	Minister of Employment and Solidarity	Jospin	28 July 1999	27 March 2000	With Dominique Gillot as Secretary of State for Health and Social Action	
	Martine Aubry	Minister of Employment and Solidarity	Jospin	27 March 2000	18 October 2000	With Dominique Gillot as Secretary of State for Health and Disability	
	Élisabeth Guigou	Minister of Employment and Solidarity	Jospin	18 October 2000	7 May 2002	With Dominique Gillot as Secretary of State for Health and Disability	
	Élisabeth Guigou	Minister of Employment and Solidarity	Jospin	6 February 2001	7 May 2002	With Bernard Kouchner as Minister Delegate in charge of Health	
	Jean-François Mattéi	Minister of Health, Family and Persons with Disabilities	Raffarin	7 May 2002	31 March 2004		
	Philippe Douste-Blazy	Minister of Health and Social Protection	Raffarin	31 March 2004	28 November 2004		
	Philippe Douste-Blazy	Minister of Solidarity, Health and Family	Raffarin	29 November 2004	2 June 2005		
	Xavier Bertrand	Minister of Health and Solidarity	Villepin	2 June 2005	26 March 2007		
	Philippe Bas	Minister of Health and Solidarity	Villepin	26 March 2007	18 May 2007		
	Roselyne Bachelot-Narquin	Minister of Health, Youth and Sports	Fillon	18 May 2007	18 June 2007		
	Roselyne Bachelot-Narquin	Minister of Health, Youth, Sports and Community Life	Fillon	18 March 2008	12 January 2009		
	Roselyne Bachelot-Narquin	Minister of Health and Sports	Fillon	12 January 2009	13 November 2010		
	Xavier Bertrand	Minister of Labour, Employment and Health	Fillon	14 November 2010	10 May 2012	With Nora Berra as Secretary of State for Health	
	Marisol Touraine	Minister of Social Affairs and Health	Ayrault	16 May 2012	31 March 2014		
	Marisol Touraine	Minister of Social Affairs, Health and Women's Rights	Valls	2 April 2014	25 August 2014		
	Marisol Touraine	Minister of Social Affairs and Health	Valls (to December 2016); Cazeneuve (from December 2016)	26 August 2014	10 May 2017		
	Agnès Buzyn	Minister of Solidarity and Health	Philippe	17 May 2017	16 February 2020		
	Olivier Véran	Minister of Solidarity and Health	Philippe (to July 2020); Castex (from July 2020)	16 February 2020	20 May 2022		
	Brigitte Bourguignon	Minister of Health and Prevention	Borne	20 May 2022	4 July 2022		
	François Braun	Minister of Health and Prevention	Borne	4 July 2022	20 July 2023		
	Aurelien Rousseau	Minister of Health and Prevention	Borne	20 July 2023	20 December 2023		
	Agnès Firmin-Le Bodo	Minister of Health and Prevention	Borne	20 December 2023	11 January 2024		
	Catherine Vautrin	Minister of Labour, Health and Solidarity	Attal	11 January 2024	21 September 2024		
	Geneviève Darrieussecq	Minister of Health and Access to Care	Barnier	21 September 2024	23 December 2024		
	Catherine Vautrin	Minister of Labour, Health, Solidarity and Families	Bayrou	23 December 2024	5 October 2025		
	Catherine Vautrin	Minister of Labour, Health, Solidarity, Families, Autonomy and Persons with Disabilities	Lecornu	5 October 2025	12 October 2025		
	Stéphanie Rist	Minister of Health, Families, Autonomy and Persons with Disabilities	Lecornu	12 October 2025	Incumbent		
