= François Billoux =

French politician (1903–1978)

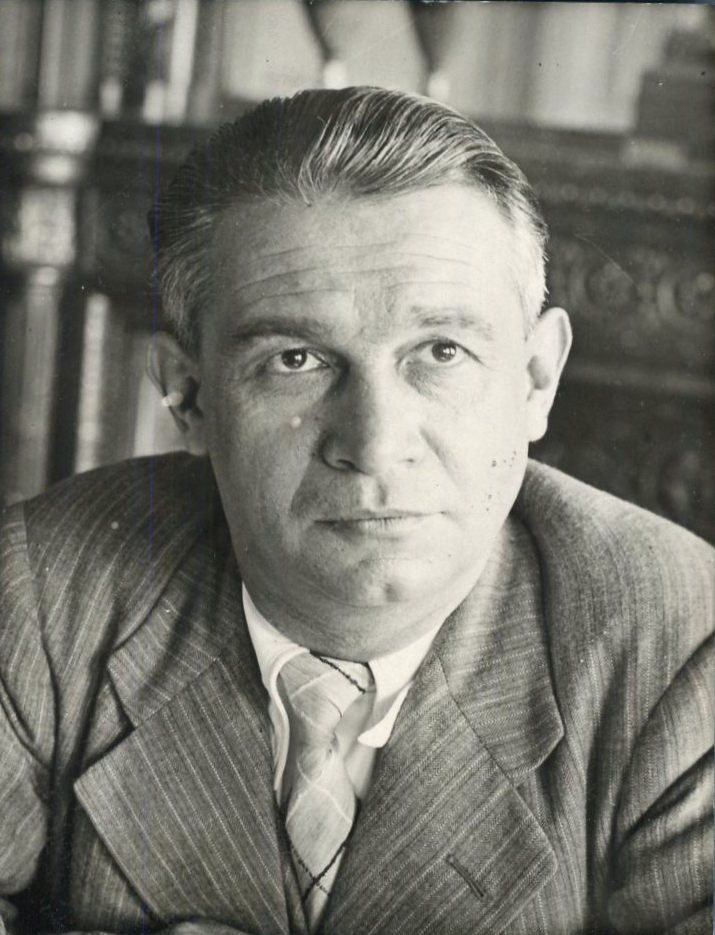
- François Billoux in 1946.

Minister of National Defence
- In office 22 January 1947 – 4 May 1947
- Prime Minister: Paul Ramadier
- Preceded by: André Le Troquer
- Succeeded by: Yvon Delbos

Minister of Reconstruction and Urban Development
- In office 26 January 1946 – 28 November 1946
- Prime Minister: Félix Gouin; Georges Bidault
- Preceded by: Raoul Dautry
- Succeeded by: René Schmitt

Minister of National Economy
- In office 21 November 1945 – 26 January 1946
- Prime Minister: Charles de Gaulle
- Preceded by: René Pleven
- Succeeded by: André Philip

Minister of Public Health
- In office 10 September 1944 – 21 November 1945
- Prime Minister: Charles de Gaulle
- Preceded by: Louis-Pasteur Vallery-Radot
- Succeeded by: Robert Prigent

Personal details
- Born: 21 May 1903 Saint-Romain-la-Motte, Loire, French Third Republic
- Died: 14 January 1978 (aged 74) Menton, Alpes-Maritimes, France
- Resting place: Père Lachaise Cemetery
- Party: French Communist Party

François Billoux (21 May 1903 – 14 January 1978) was a French communist politician.

== Biography ==
Billoux was born in Saint-Romain-la-Motte. He was a member of the Central Committee of the French Communist Party (PCF) from 1926, and a member of the Politburo from 1936. From 1928 until 1931, he was also General Secretary of the Young Communist Movement of France (MJCF), the youth wing of the PCF.

Billoux served as a member of the Chamber of Deputies from 1936 to 1940, and the National Assembly from 1945 to 1978, representing Bouches-du-Rhône. During World War II, Billoux was interned in France and Algeria from 1940 until he was freed after Operation Torch in 1943. In the post-war years, he served as Minister of Public Health (1944–1945), Minister of National Economy (1945–1946), Minister of Reconstruction and Urban Development (1946) and Minister of National Defence (1947). He died in Menton, and is buried in Père Lachaise Cemetery in Paris.
