= Arthaud =

Arthaud is a surname. Notable people with the surname include:

- Florence Arthaud (1957–2015), French sailor
- Joseph Arthaud (1813–1883), French physician
- Nathalie Arthaud (born 1970), French politician
- René Arthaud (1915–2007), French politician

== See also ==
- Artaldus, also known as Arthaud, was a 13th-century Carthusian Bishop of Belley
- Artaud
