= Alexander Israel =

Alexander Israel may refer to:

- Alex Israel (born 1982), American artist
- Alex Israel (businessman), founder of Metropolis Technologies

== See also ==
- Alexandre Israël (1868–1937), French politician
- Alexander Israel Helphand (1867–1924), Lithuanian politician
