= Félix Gouin =

French politician (1884–1977)

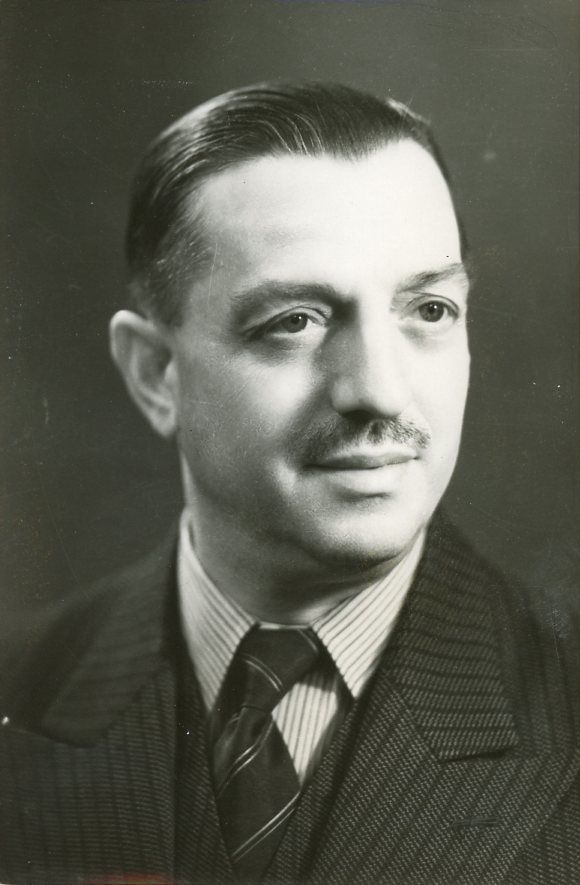
- Gouin in 1936

Chair of the Provisional Government of the French Republic
- In office 26 January 1946 – 24 June 1946
- Prime Minister: Himself
- Deputy: Maurice Thorez; Francisque Gay
- Preceded by: Charles de Gaulle
- Succeeded by: Georges Bidault

Prime Minister of France
- In office 26 January 1946 – 24 June 1946
- President: Himself
- Preceded by: Charles de Gaulle
- Succeeded by: Georges Bidault

President of the Constituent National Assembly
- In office 8 November 1945 – 22 January 1946
- President: Charles de Gaulle
- Preceded by: Himself (as President of the Consultative Assembly)
- Succeeded by: Vincent Auriol

President of the Consultative Assembly
- In office 9 November 1943 – 8 November 1945
- Preceded by: Édouard Herriot (as President of the National Assembly) (in 1940)
- Succeeded by: Himself (as president of the national assembly)

Personal details
- Born: 4 October 1884 Peypin, France
- Died: 25 October 1977 (aged 93) Nice, France
- Party: Socialist
- Other political affiliations: SFIO
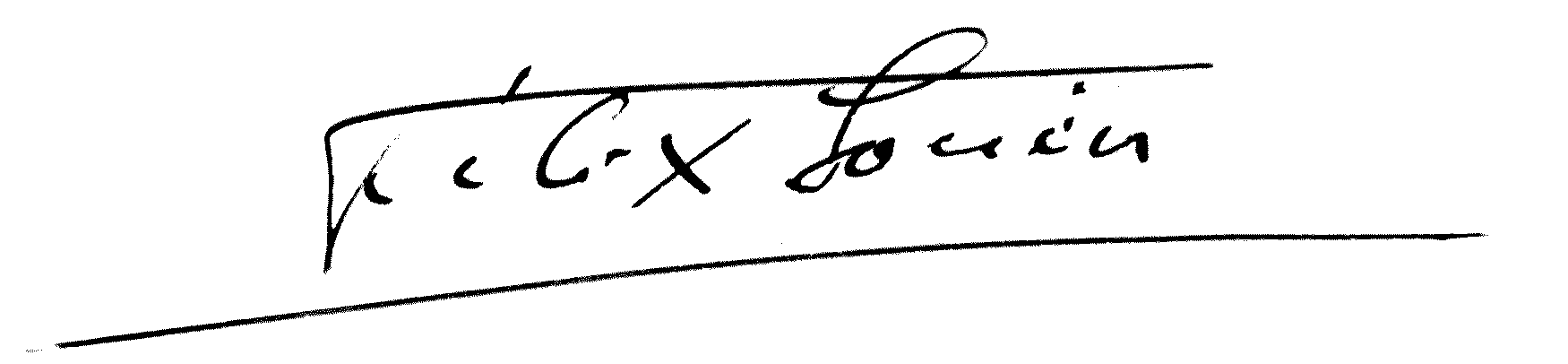
- Signature

Félix Gouin (French: [feliks ɡwɛ̃]; 5 October 1884 – 25 October 1977) was a French Socialist politician who was a member of the French Section of the Workers' International (SFIO).

== Personal life ==
Félix Gouin was born in Peypin, Bouches-du-Rhône, the son of school teachers. He studied law in Aix-en-Provence.

In 1940 he was among the minority of parliamentarians refusing to grant full powers to Marshal Philippe Pétain.

During the war, he was part of the central committee which reconstituted the Human Rights League and also co-founded the Brutus Network, a Socialist Resistance group.

In 1946, he then succeeded Charles de Gaulle as head of the French Provisional Government. Gouin's tenure was arguably most notable for seeing the enactment of France's first ever compulsory, amply funded retirement and worker's compensation laws. In addition, both the 40-hour law and overtime pay were re-established, while the comités d'entreprise ("works councils") were extended to firms with 50 workers. In April 1946, a statute was adopted by the French Parliament that abolished the colonial legal status of France's four oldest colonies: Réunion, Guyane, Martinique, and Guadeloupe. Gouin's time in office also witnessed a significant extension of the role of the state in the workings of the French economy, with electricity, gas, coal, and the nine main insurance groups nationalized.

== Honours and awards ==
- Grand Croix of the Légion d'honneur
- Grand Decoration of Honour in Silver with Sash for Services to the Republic of Austria

== Government (26 January – 24 June 1946) ==
- Félix Gouin – Chairman of the Provisional Government
- Francisque Gay – Vice President of the Council
- Maurice Thorez – Vice President of the Council
- Georges Bidault – Minister of Foreign Affairs
- Edmond Michelet – Minister of Armies
- André Le Troquer – Minister of the Interior
- André Philip – Minister of Finance and National Economy
- Marcel Paul – Minister of Industrial Production
- Ambroise Croizat – Minister of Labour and Social Security
- Pierre-Henri Teitgen – Minister of Justice
- Marcel Edmond Naegelen – Minister of National Education
- Laurent Casanova – Minister of Veterans and War Victims
- François Tanguy-Prigent – Minister of Agriculture
- Henri Longchambon – Minister of Supply
- Marius Moutet – Minister of Overseas France
- Jules Moch – Minister of Public Works and Transport
- Robert Prigent – Minister of Public Health and Population
- François Billoux – Minister of Reconstruction and Town Planning
- Jean Letourneau – Minister of Posts

Political offices
Preceded by Charles de Gaulle	Chair of the Provisional Government of France; 1946	Succeeded by Georges Bidault
