= Château de l'Arthaudière =

Castle in Isère department, France

Coordinates: 45°7′9″N 5°13′59″E

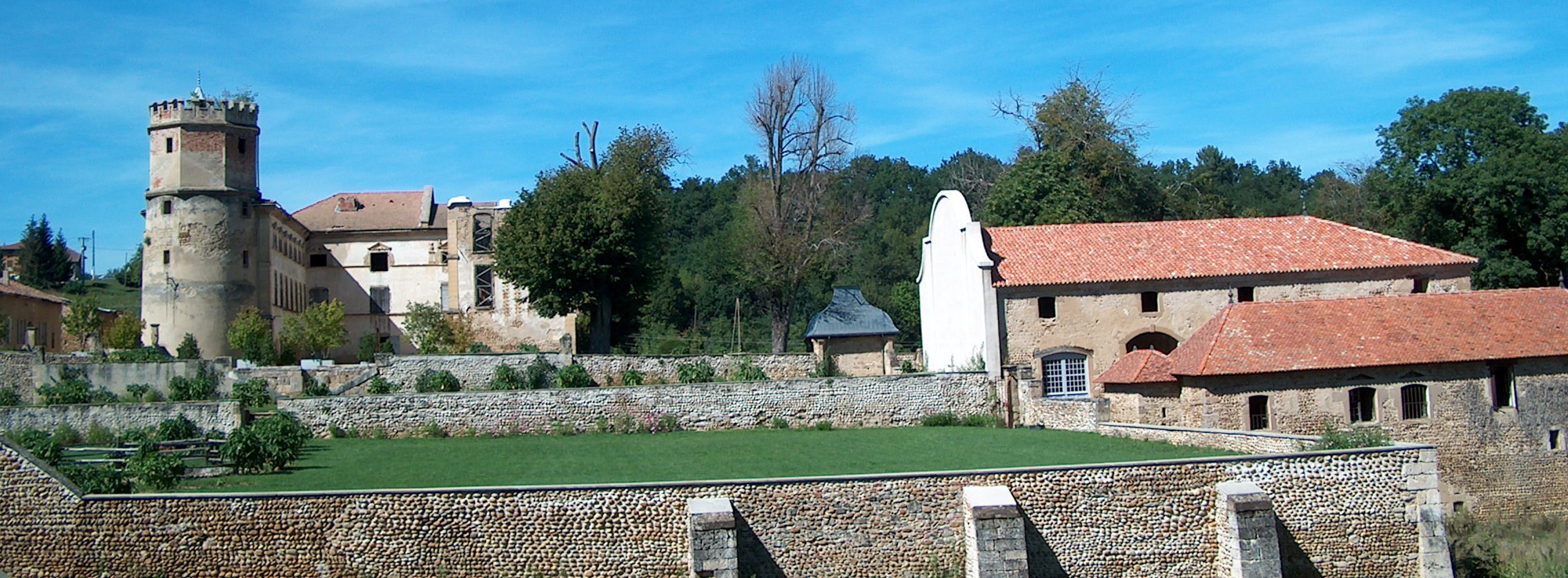
View of the Château de l'Arthaudière from the stables

The Château de l'Arthaudière is a castle, later converted into a château , in the commune of Saint-Bonnet-de-Chavagne in the Isère département of France. It was the former seigniory of the Arthauds and of the La Porte. The castle has been listed since 1991 as a monument historique by the French Ministry of Culture.

== History ==
The oldest part of the castle, the round tower (French: la Tour ronde), dates from the 13th century. The keep with an oblong plan dates from the 15th century, probably constructed by the Arthaud family.

At the start of the Renaissance, between the Italian Wars and the Wars of Religion, the castle underwent many drastic alterations. A gallery with an upper floor was built against the western enclosing wall and the tower. At the bottom of the tower a chapel was founded at the beginning of the 16th century. André I de la Porte speaks about it in his will in 1517. At the junction of the Renaissance portico with the northern buildings, a spiral staircase was installed in the 17th century.

Above the chapel, on the first floor, there is a study with an armoured door. This door consists firstly of strongly studded fir, together with a cast iron base, the whole to be opened with a single key. This part of the chapel stored the most valuable goods of the Arthauds.

The tower opens to a courtyard through a series of arcades with Italian influences. Italian Renaissance is perhaps the best represented period in the influence of the architecture. The terrace gardens were probably landscaped in the 17th century; today, they serve as a venue for theatre and musical productions.

=== The grand stables ===
After the tower, the most prominent external feature of the château is perhaps the grand stables. Like the castle, the current stables underwent several periods of construction. Their design in the shape of an "L" delimits the first accessible court from the large alley. A passage surmounted by a lantern, intended to transfer fodder to the haylofts upstairs, gives access to another court bordered to the south by the coachman's quarters and a gate leading out. The coach house, the oldest part of the building, today contains a small museum of the history of the castle and the families that lived there.

To the right of the entrance to the stable yards, one can see an Empire roof of metal glazed tiles set on four octagonal pillars that shelters a stone basin.

== See also ==
- List of castles in France
