= Étienne Wolff =

French biologist (1904–1996)

- Born: 12 February 1904; Auxerre, France
- Died: 18 November 1996 (aged 92); Paris, France
- Education: Lycée Corneille
- Occupation: Biologist
- Known for: Member of the Académie Française

Étienne Wolff (Auxerre, 12 February 1904 – Paris, 18 November 1996) was a French biologist, specialising in experimental and teratological embryology. He led the Société zoologique de France from 1958 and was elected to the French Academy of Sciences in 1963.

== Personal life ==
He was educated at the Lycée Pierre-Corneille in Rouen.

Wolff was an advocate of animal rights. He was President of the French League for Animal Rights (1984-1986).

== Works ==
- Thèses présentées à la Faculté des sciences de l'Université de Strasbourg pour obtenir le grade de docteur ès-sciences biologiques. 1re thèse : Les Bases de la tératogénèse expérimentale des vertébrés amniotes d'après les résultats de méthodes directes. 2e thèse : L'Évolution après l'éclosion des poulets mâles transformés en intersexués par l'hormone femelle injectée aux jeunes embryons (1936)
- Les Changements de sexe (1946)
- La Science des monstres (1948)
- Les Chemins de la vie (1963)
- The Living Organism (1965)
- La poésie funéraire épigraphique à Rome (1971)
- Les Pancrates, nos nouveaux maîtres (1975)
- Dialogues avec mes animaux familiers (1979)
- Trois pattes pour un canard (1990)

Preceded by Louis Pasteur Vallery-Radot	Seat 24 of the Académie française 1971-1996	Succeeded by Jean-François Revel
