= Pierre Schneiter =

French politician (1905–1979)

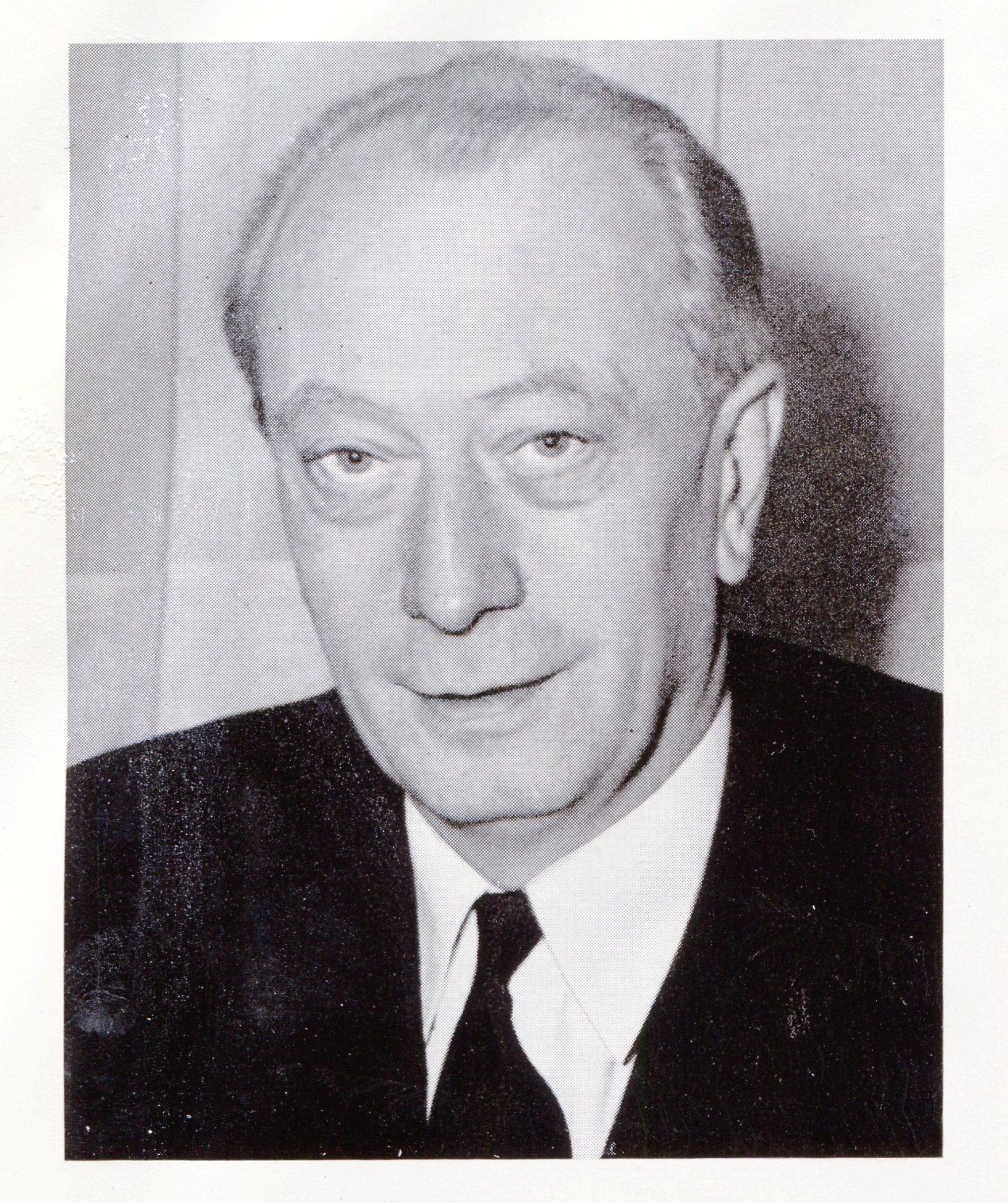
- Schneiter in 1958

Minister of Health
- In office 1948–1951
- Preceded by: Germaine Poinso-Chapuis
- Succeeded by: Paul Ribeyre

President of the National Assembly
- In office 1955

Member of the National Assembly from Marne
- In office 1946–1958

Mayor of Reims
- In office 1957–1959

Personal details
- Born: 13 May 1905 Reims, France
- Died: 19 March 1979 (aged 73)
- Political party: Popular Republican Movement
- Spouse: Marguerite Fandre
- Children: 5, including Jean-Louis Schneiter

François Charles Pierre Schneiter (13 May 1905 – 19 March 1979) was a French politician.

== Biography ==
Pierre Schneiter was born in Reims as the elder son of Charles Albert Schneiter, a wine broker, and Jeanne Marie Alice Sart. Charles Schneiter's father was a watchmaker from Bern, whose ancestors had come from Bavaria. Pierre's only sibling, Marie François André Schneiter, was born in 1914. The brothers followed their father into the wine trade. Pierre married Marguerite Marie Thérèse Fandre in 1931. Their son Jean-Louis (born 1933) was mayor of Reims until 2008.

Both Schneiter brothers were active in the French Resistance during the Second World War. André was arrested by the Gestapo in 1944 and executed at Tournes on 29 August 1944. He is cited in the private papers of U.S. Army ETO Deputy Commander Lt. Gen. John C. H. Lee as "Sousprefect at Reims" in December 1944.

In 1946 Pierre Schneiter was elected as a candidate for the Popular Republican Movement to represent Marne in the National Assembly. He served as Assistant-Secretary for Foreign Affairs and as Secretary for German Affairs before being appointed Minister of Health in 1948, serving until 11 August 1951. He replaced André Le Troquer as President of the National Assembly for a short period in early 1955. He left the National Assembly in 1958.

Schneiter was mayor of Reims from 1957 to 1959. He was made an Officer of the Legion of Honour.

== Bibliography ==
- Dictionnaire de biographie rémoise
