= Paul Ribeyre =

French politician (1906–1988)

Paul François Ribeyre

Minister of Health and Population
- In office 11 August 1951 – 7 January 1953
- Prime Minister: René Pleven; Edgar Faure; Antoine Pinay
- Preceded by: Pierre Schneiter
- Succeeded by: André Boutemy

Minister of Commerce
- In office 8 January 1953 – 9 February 1953
- Prime Minister: René Mayer
- Preceded by: Jean-Marie Louvel
- Succeeded by: Guy Petit

Minister of Health
- In office 11 February 1953 – 27 May 1953
- Prime Minister: René Mayer
- Preceded by: André Boutemy
- Succeeded by: Paul Coste-Floret

Minister of Justice and Population
- In office 28 June 1953 – 19 June 1954
- Prime Minister: Joseph Laniel
- Preceded by: Léon Martinaud-Déplat
- Succeeded by: Émile Hugues

Minister of Industry and Commerce
- In office 6 November 1957 – 1 June 1958
- Prime Minister: Félix Gaillard; Pierre Pflimlin
- Preceded by: André Morice
- Succeeded by: Édouard Ramonet

Personal details
- Born: 11 December 1906 Aubagne, Bouches-du-Rhône, France
- Died: 14 January 1988 (aged 81) Valence, Drôme, France

Paul François Ribeyre (11 December 1906 – 14 January 1988) was a French mineral water bottler and liberal conservative politician who was a deputy in the Constituent Assembly and then the National Assembly from 1945 to 1958, then a senator from 1959 to 1980. He was Minister of Health in several cabinets in 1951–53, Minister of Commerce for a few weeks in 1953, Minister of Justice in 1953–54, and Minister of Industry and Commerce in 1957–58.

== Early years ==
Paul François Ribeyre was born on 11 December 1906 in Aubagne, Bouches-du-Rhône. After his primary education in Vals-les-Bains he attended the Collège du Sacré-Cœur in Marseille for his secondary education. He succeeded his father as general manager of Vals-Reine, a small company that bottled mineral water from a source in Vals-les-Bains, and held this position until Vals-Reine merged with three other local bottling companies in 1968. During World War II (1939-45) he was appointed mayor of Vals-les-Bains on 18 July 1943 during the German occupation. On 16 June 1944 a German armored column occupied the town, and demanded a list of hostages from Ribeyre. He refused and was arrested, for which he later received the Legion of Honour. With the Liberation of France he was replaced as mayor on 14 August 1944.

== Regional politics ==
Ribeyre ran in the municipal elections of 29 April 1945 and was elected as councilor. He was appointed mayor of Vals-les-Bains on 18 May 1945, holding this office until 1983. Ribeyre founded the center-right Union républicaine ardéchoise (URA, Ardèche Republican Union) and the conservative journal La Gazette des Cévennes. On 9 November 1947 he was elected to the general council of Ardèche for the canton of Saint-Pierreville. He was a general councilor until 1979, and president of the general council of Ardèche from 1951 to 1955 and from 1959 to 1979.

== National politics ==
Ribeyre was elected to represent Ardèche in the National Constituent Assembly on 21 October 1945 on the Républicaine Liberté et Concorde list. He joined the Entente Républicaine group in the chamber. After this he joined the Parti Paysan, which became the Centre national des indépendants et paysans (CNIP), and remained with this party for the rest of his political career. He did not support the draft constitution, which was rejected in the subsequent referendum. Ribeyre was reelected to the second National Constituent Assembly on 2 June 1946, and was elected as deputy to the National Assembly on 10 November 1946. He was reelected deputy for Ardèche on 17 June 1951 and on 2 January 1956, remaining a deputy until 8 December 1958 at the end of the French Fourth Republic. He became president of the Parliamentary Association for Freedom of Education.

On 28 October 1949 Ribeyre was appointed under-secretary of state for Public Health and Population in the cabinet of Georges Bidault. He resigned on 4 December 1949 in protest against a decree on agricultural prices. Ribeyre was appointed Minister of Public Health and Population on 11 August 1951 in the cabinet of René Pleven and remained in office until 7 January 1953 in the subsequent cabinets of Edgar Faure and Antoine Pinay. On 23 April 1952 Ribeyre sent instructions to the staff of the Ministry of Population on applications for naturalization. He said "Requests by citizens of far-away countries and especially those made by foreigners from exotic countries must be greeted with the greatest reserve."

One must avoid naturalizing elements that, by virtue of their origin, would be hard to assimilate and could alter the ethnic and spiritual characteristics of the French nation ... In order to avoid a break in the equilibrium between the Mediterranean and the Nordic contributions whose blend characterizes the French ethnic 'composite,' there is reason to favor to the fullest extent possible the naturalization of foreigners originating in countries of Western Europe (England, Scandinavia, Holland, Belgium, Luxembourg, Switzerland).

In September 1952 Ribeyre proposed a European Health Community modeled on the European Coal and Steel Community. It would facilitate trade, standards, research and development in the field of medicine between the member states. The response from the other cabinet members was lukewarm, and the bureaucrats and industry lobby groups resisted the proposal. In the end, nothing was done. Ribeyre was Minister of Commerce in the cabinet of René Mayer from 9 January 1953 to 11 February 1953. After André Boutémy resigned, he was Minister of Health in Mayer's cabinet from 11 February 1953 to 27 May 1953. He was Minister of Justice and Population from 28 June 1953 to 19 June 1954 in the cabinet of Joseph Laniel. He played a central role in having Xavier Vallat, former Vichy commissioner for Jewish Affairs, released from prison. Ribeyre was Minister of Industry and Commerce from 6 November 1957 to 1 June 1958 in the cabinet of Félix Gaillard.

Paul Ribeyre was a senator from 1 January 1959 to 1 January 1980. He was chairman of the European Health Club, which was granted consultative status to the Council of Europe in 1982. He died at the age of 81 on 14 January 1988 in Valence, Drôme.

== Publications ==
- Paul Ribeyre (1952). La Communauté européenne de la santé. X. Blanc-Bernard, interviewer. Paris: impr. de Lang, Blanchong et Cie.
- Paul Ribeyre (1952). preface. Mémento pratique des étrangers, recueil des principales dispositions applicables aux étrangers en France. By François Villey. la Documentation française. p. 125.
- L'Amélioration du sort des gens âgés, journées régionales d'études organisées par la délégation régionale du Nord de l'Alliance nationale contre la dépopulation avec la collaboration de l'Institut régional d'études et d'action démographiques du Nord de la France. Paul Ribeyre, preface. Union nationale des caisses d'allocations familiales. 1953. p. 131.
- Paul Ribeyre (1955). Les syndicats des copropriétaires. Les Cahiers de la copropriété. p. 80.

== Sources ==
- Council of Europe (1982). COUNCIL OF EUROPE - PARLIAMENTARY ASSEMBLY - THIIRTY-FOURTH ORDINARY SESSION - (Secon Part) 29 September- 7 October 1982. DOCUMENTS WORKING PAPAERS. Strasbourg. GGKEY:21A66QWT370.
- Parsons, Craig (2006). A Certain Idea of Europe. Cornell University Press. ISBN 0-8014-7296-2.
- "RIBEYRE (Paul, François)". Biographie de la IVe République (in French). Assemblée nationale.
- Weil, Patrick (1 July 2010). How to Be French: Nationality in the Making since 1789. Duke University Press. ISBN 978-0-8223-8947-7.
