= Georges Villiers =

French mining engineer

- Born: 15 June 1899; Charbonnières-les-Bains, Lyon, France
- Died: 13 April 1982 (aged 82); Paris, France
- Occupations: Engineer, politician

Georges Villiers (15 June 1899 – 13 April 1982) was a French mining engineer who was mayor of Lyon during World War II (1939–45), then was deported to Dachau. After the war for many years he was head of the national employers association.

== Early years ==
Georges Villiers was born in Charbonnières-les-Bains, Lyon, on 15 June 1899. He attended the Lycée Ampère and the Lycée Parc for his secondary education, and then student at the École des mines of Saint-Étienne. He joined the Société de Constructions métalliques Derobert et Cie as a research engineer. He was made director of its successor, the Société Constructions métalliques et Entreprises. This was a family firm with 700 workers, large in comparison to most French companies at the time. In 1936 he was appointed president of the Chambre syndicale de la métallurgie du Rhône.

== World War II ==
During World War II, Édouard Herriot was dismissed from his office as mayor of Lyon. In May 1941 Villiers went to Vichy to defend the independence of the Lyon city council. François Darlan assured him it would be maintained, and offered him the position of mayor. Villiers consulted with Herriot and then accepted. As mayor he protected Resistance fighters and Jews. Later, after the French zone libre was occupied by the Germans, on 10 November 1942 Vichy removed the many elements hostile to the Germans from the city council, including Villiers. Pierre Bertrand, a Lyon surgeon, was appointed to replace Villiers on 10 February 1943.

André Boutemy worked with Villiers while he was mayor. After being dismissed Villiers joined a Resistance network, and was later arrested by the Gestapo. Boutemy saved Villiers from being executed by a German firing squad. Instead he was deported to the Dachau concentration camp. His fellow prisoners spoke with admiration of his deportment in Dachau. He was liberated in April 1945.

== Later career ==
After the war Henri Lafond worked with Pierre Ricard, leader of the foundry association, and Henri Davezac to form the Conseil national du patronat français (CNPF). The CNPF represented French employers, with Villiers as the first president. Villiers was president of the CNPF from 1946 to 1966. Despite his comparatively modest background compared with other industrial leaders, Villiers was greatly respected and had considerable power. Some thought that he was under the thumbs of Ricard, but the CNPF archives show that the reverse was true. Villiers stayed in office for many years after Ricard had died. In 1955 there was a major strike in the Saint-Nazaire shipyards including occupation of the works. Concessions made by some employers were seen by the patronat as a betrayal of the business community. Villiers said, "if we do not manage to stop the slogan that the 22 per cent [pay rise] accepted in one place can be accepted esewhere, the economy of the country is finished."

The Centre d'Études Economiques (CEE) was established in 1945 as a vehicle for distributing funds from industry to political parties. Boutemey and Maurice Brulfer headed the CEE, which gave funding to the right-wing Republican Party of Liberty (PRL). Boutemy worked with Georges Villiers as president of the CNPF. The CNPF was closely associated with the CEE, although Villiers would not attend meetings at the CEE offices since he did not want to appear involved in politics. Villiers was president of the Confederation of European Business from 1961 to 1962.

Villiers died in Paris on 13 April 1982.

== Publications ==
Publications by Georges Villiers included:

- Georges Villiers (1942), Le Maire dans la cité (Conférence donnée par M. Georges Villiers,... le... 26 mars 1942 devant le groupe lyonnais des Jeunes patrons.), Lyon: Bosc frères et L. Riou, p. 31
- Bernard Cornut-Gentille; Georges Villiers (1947), Visite de M. Georges Villiers,... à Strasbourg, le 23 janvier 1947, Introduction de L. Macheret. Allocutions de MM. Bernard de Turckheim, Mathiez, Bernard Cornut-Gentille et Georges Villiers., Strasbourg : Chambre patronale des industries du Bas-Rhin et des régions limitrophes, p. 28
- Georges Villiers (1948), La Libre entreprise (Message de Georges Villiers), Extrait de "France-Documents", n° 22, août 1948, Paris: Association de la Libre entreprise, p. 20
- Raymond Boisdé; Henri Truchy; Georges Villiers (1948), Rapprochements américains, Paris: les Éditions nouvelles, p. 28
- Georges Villiers (1949), Les Industries du Bas-Rhin et des régions limitrophes, 1949., Introduction par Bernard de Turckheim, Strasbourg
- Georges Villiers (1951), Possibilités actuelles de la construction métallique pour les ossatures de bâtiments (Allocution), Annales de l'Institut technique du bâtiment et des travaux publics. Construction métallique. N° 9. Centre d'études supérieures, Paris: Institut technique du bâtiment et des travaux publics; Tours, impr. de Arrault, p. 48
- Georges Villiers; Louis Genot (1952), Journée interprofessionnelle de la productivité à Marseille, Marseille: Association francaise pour l'accroissement de la productivité, Société pour la défense du commerce et de l'industrie, p. 34
- Georges Villiers (1956), Marcel Crozet-Fourneyron. Pensées d'un homme d'action, Paris: Librairie de Médicis, p. 16
- Georges Villiers (1957), Les Leçons du passé (Extraits des procès-verbaux des réunions du Conseil national du patronat français), Édité par J. Petit, à la demande du Conseil national du patronat français, p. 10
- Georges Villiers (1978), Témoignages, Paris: Éditions France-Empire, p. 244

== Sources ==
- Coignard, Sophie; Guichard, Marie-Thérèse (2000-01-01). French Connections: Networks of Influence. Algora Publishing. ISBN 978-1-892941-16-9.
- Collectif (1992). Dictionnaire des parlementaires français 1940–1958 (in French). Vol. 2. La Documentation française.
- Georges Villiers (1899-1982) (in French), BnF: Bibliotheque nationale de France
- History of the organisation, BusinessEurope, archived from the original on 2023-06-01
- Author, No (1998), "Le renouvellement des élites municipales à Lyon : 1935-1953", Rives méditerranéennes (in French) (1): 39–52, doi:10.4000/rives.143, ISSN 2103-4001
- Mahl, R., "Henri LAFOND (1894–1963)", Annales des Mines (in French)
- "Villiers, Georges", Patrons de France (in French)
- Vinen, Richard (2002-07-11). Bourgeois Politics in France, 1945-1951. Cambridge University Press. ISBN 978-0-521-52276-2.
