= Jean-Louis Schneiter =

French politician

Mayor of Reims
- In office 17 May 1999 – 20 March 2008
- Preceded by: Jean Falala
- Succeeded by: Adeline Hazan

Member of the National Assembly for Marne's 1st constituency
- In office 19 March 1978 – 22 May 1981

Personal details
- Born: 17 January 1933 Reims, Marne, France
- Died: 7 September 2016 (aged 83) Nantes, France
- Party: UDF
- Spouse: Josette Cercleron
- Parent(s): Pierre Schneiter; Marguerite Fandre

Jean-Louis Schneiter (17 January 1933 – 7 September 2016) was a French politician. He served as a member of the National Assembly from 1978 to 1981, representing Marne. He served as the mayor of Reims from 1999 to 2008.
