= André Boutemy =

French lawyer and politician

Minister of Health and Population
- In office 8 January 1953 – 9 February 1953
- Prime Minister: René Mayer
- Preceded by: Paul Ribeyre
- Succeeded by: Paul Ribeyre

Personal details
- Born: 21 December 1905 Bécherel, Ille-et-Vilaine, France
- Died: 14 July 1959 (aged 53) Combs-la-Ville, Seine-et-Marne, France

André Boutemy (21 December 1905 – 14 July 1959) was a French lawyer, senior administrator and then politician. He served under the Vichy government during the occupation of France in World War II (1939–45), and as a result was barred from politics until 1950. In the immediate post-war period he distributed funds from industry to support right-wing politicians running for election. He was elected to the senate in 1952 and was briefly Minister of Health in 1953 before being forced to resign by the communist deputies.

== Life ==
=== Early years (1905–39) ===
André Boutemy was born on 21 December 1905 in Bécherel, Ille-et-Vilaine. He was the son of a primary school inspector. He earned a law degree, and was admitted as a rédacteur (Note: A rédacteur, literally an editor, is an officer in charge of writing or drafting administrative documents.) to the Ministry of Finance in 1929, where he was seconded to the Finance Committee of the chamber of deputies. In 1925 he entered the office of Jammy-Schmidt, undersecretary of state of Finance in charge of the liberated regions. At the start of World War II (1939–45) he was a subaltern civil servant in the Ministry of Finance.

=== World War II (1939–45) ===
During the war the Vichy authorities named Boutemy deputy prefect of Thonon-les-Bains in October 1940. On 29 November 1941 he was appointed director of General Information. In this office, where he served under Pucheu and Pierre Laval, he was responsible for tracking all real or potential opposition movements. On 14 May 1943 he was appointed prefect of the Loire. On 11 June 1944 regional prefect of the Rhône. The German authorities explicitly approved his appointment as super-prefect for the Lyon region. Later he was accused of being directly responsible for the killings of French Resistance fighters.

Boutemy worked with Georges Villiers, who had been appointed mayor of Lyon after Édouard Herriot was dismissed. He saved Villiers from being executed by a German firing squad. He was removed from office during the Liberation of France and detained in Saint-Étienne, then in Fresnes Prison. Boutemy had assisted members of the Resistance, and therefore did not receive serious punishment after the Liberation. However, as late as 1948 the Council of State stated that whatever good deeds Boutemy had done during the war, "he had associated himself in the exercise of his functions intimately and actively with the policies of the government."

=== Post-war politics (1945–59) ===
General Charles de Gaulle would not allow Boutemy run for election to the senate in 1948 on the Gaullist ticket, and this may have led to Boutemy's later hostility to the Gaullist Rally of the French People (RPF). Boutemy's civil rights were finally restored in November 1950.

The Centre d'Études Economiques (CEE) was established in 1945 as a vehicle for distributing funds from industry to political parties. Boutemey and Maurice Brulfer headed the CEE, which gave funding to the right-wing Republican Party of Liberty (PRL). Boutemy worked with Georges Villiers, now president of the newly created Conseil national du patronat français (CNPF, National Council of French Employers). The CEE was closely associated with the CNPF, although Villiers would not attend meetings at the CEE offices since he did not want to appear involved in politics. According to Georgette Elgey, Boutemy was responsible for the "stupefying" role of business in the 1951 elections. A PRL leader wrote, "This support called or nothing in return ... He [Boutemy] dispensed his envelopes with the pride of a nabob in splendid surroundings, but he was poorly rewarded for his generosity." An incomplete list of 160 deputies assisted in this way was circulated in parliament after the 1951 elections.

On 18 May 1952 Boutemy was elected to the Council of the Republic for Seine-et-Marne on the Union of Republicans list. He continued to support the interests of the employers movement while a deputy. Boutemy's position as their former paymaster would later give him considerable influence among deputies who had been helped. He was named Minister of Health and Population on 8 January 1953 in the cabinet of René Mayer. (Note: Mayer was one of those who had accepted funds from Boutemy.) His appointment was highly controversial due to his wartime record. It was asserted but not proved that his appointment was due to pressure from the chemical industry, which was concerned about the efforts Boutemy's predecessor had made towards allowing free competition in a European market for pharmaceutical products. He was forced out of office by the communist deputies. After a hostile reaction to the budget he submitted for his ministry he resigned on 9 February 1953.

Boutemy represented France at the European Parliamentary Assembly in 1957. On 2–3 June 1958 he voted for the constitutional revision that would create the French Fifth Republic. He was reelected to the senate in June 1958 at the head of the list of the Republican Union. Boutemy was reelected on 26 April 1959, and was active in the senate until shortly before his death. André Boutemy died on 14 July 1959 in Combs-la-Ville, Seine-et-Marne.

== Sources ==
- "BOUTEMY (André)". Archives Nationales (in French). Ministère de la culture et de la communication.
- "BOUTEMY (André)". Dictionnaire des parlementaires français Ve République (in French).
- Coignard, Sophie; Guichard, Marie-Thérèse (2000-01-01). French Connections: Networks of Influence. Algora Publishing. ISBN 978-1-892941-16-9.
- Collectif (1992). Dictionnaire des parlementaires français 1940–1958 (in French). Vol. 2. La Documentation française.
- Ehrmann, Henry Walter (2015-12-08). Organized Business in France. Princeton University Press. ISBN 978-1-4008-7832-1.
- Vinen, Richard (2002-07-11). Bourgeois Politics in France, 1945-1951. Cambridge University Press. ISBN 978-0-521-52276-2.
