= L'Aube (newspaper) =

- Front page on 29 April 1945
- Type: National newspaper
- Founded: 20 January 1932
- Ceased publication: 20 October 1951
- Political alignment: Christian democrat
- Language: French
- City: Paris
- Country: France
- ISSN: 1255-9768

L'Aube was a daily newspaper founded by Francisque Gay that was published in France between 1932 and 1951.

It presented a Christian Democratic viewpoint.

The newspaper struggled in the period before World War II (1939–45), and was closed from 1940 to 1944.

After the liberation of France it was relaunched, and at first had considerable success as the organ of the Popular Republican Movement. With changes in the political mood in the post-war period it went into decline and was forced to close in 1951.

== Origins ==
Francisque Gay, future publisher and editor of L'Aube, launched the weekly La Vie Catholique in October 1924.

The journal aimed to inform and unite Catholics of different viewpoints. La Vie Catholique was independent, and after 1926 was hostile to the right-wing Action Française movement, although in 1928 Gay asserted that it was not involved in party politics.

In January 1932 Gay launched the new Catholic daily L'Aube. He intended the paper to be read by all "democrats with a Christian inspiration."

== History ==
The first issue of L'Aube appeared on 20 January 1932.

The paper was founded without capital, and never had enough subscribers.

It was also impaired by a legacy of mistrust and resentment from the controversies of La Vie Catholique.

The newspaper had between 7,000 and 11,000 subscribers at first. Gay launched the "Amis de l'Aube" in 1937 in an effort the gain support. The association met in Paris for three days in November 1937, and had 1,342 members.

By 1938 and 1939 the paper printed at least 20,000 copies, but still sold only 12,000 to 15,000 copies.

The future premier Georges Bidault began contributing to the paper in March 1932. Bidault began writing editorials in 1934, and in effect became editor-in-chief.

From 1934 the journal was the joint work of Gay and Bidault. L'Aube became noted for Bidault's editorials.

The paper continued the fight against the Action Française.

It had a complex relationship with the Popular Democratic Party (PDP), which it increasingly saw as belonging to the right.

On colonial issues the paper rejected the "mystique of Empire" and opposed repressive measures.

In 1939 the paper opposed the policy of appeasement of Hitler.

Maurice Schumann was the political editor of L'Aube at the start of World War II (1939–45), writing under the pseudonym of André Sidobre. During the war the paper ceased publication on 10 June 1940, and resumed on 23 August 1944.

When it was relaunched after the Liberation of France it printed 240,000 copies.

In the first two years the paper prospered, due in part to the popularity of the Popular Republican Movement, in part to the fact that its rival Catholic daily, La Croix, did not appear for six months after the liberation of Paris.

After that, L'Aube went into steady decline. Schumann was political director of the newspaper from 1945 to 1951.

Post-war daily print volumes were:

- 1944 180,000
- 1945 180,000
- 1946 240,000
- 1947 108,000
- 1948 60,000
- 1949 40,000
- 1950 36,000
- 1951 35,000

The paper did not appear between 13 February 1947 and 17 March 1947. The last issue appeared on 20 October 1951.

== Sources ==
- Comte, Bernard (1967). "Françoise Mayeur. L'aube. Étude d'un journal d'opinion (1932-1940)". Revue d'histoire de l'Église de France (in French). 53 (150).
- Delbreil, Jean-Claude (1990). Centrisme et démocratie-chrétienne en France: le Parti démocrate populaire des origines au M.R.P., 1919-1944 (in French). Publications de la Sorbonne. ISBN 978-2-85944-182-1.
- "L'Aube (Paris. 1932)". BnF (in French).
- Letamendia, Pierre (1995). Le mouvement républicain populaire: le MRP, histoire d'un grand parti français (in French). Editions Beauchesne. ISBN 978-2-7010-1327-5.
- "Maurice SCHUMANN" (in French). Académie française.
- "Maurice SCHUMANN (1911-1998)" (in French). Sénat.
- Pierrard, Pierre (1988). Les laïcs dans l'Eglise de France: XIXe-XXe siècle. Editions de l'Atelier. ISBN 978-2-7082-2563-3.
- Pietri, Luce; Vauchez, André; Mayeur, Jean-Marie; Venard, Marc (1990-11-01). Guerres mondiales et totalitarismes (1914-1958): Histoire du christianisme (in French). Mame-Desclée. ISBN 978-2-7189-0740-6.
