= Georges Leredu =

French politician and lawyer

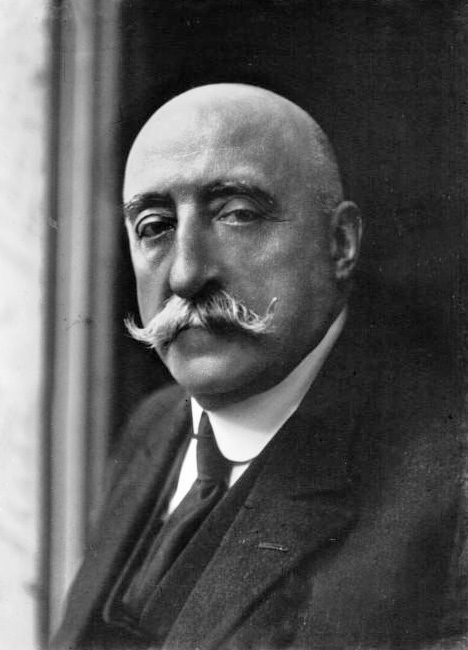
Georges Leredu.

George Leredu (2 June 1860, Metz – 23 June 1943), lawyer, was mayor of Franconville-la-Garenne from 1908 to 1919, deputy (representative of parliament) from 1914 to 1927 then senator until 1936. He was Minister for Health after having been a Secretary of State of the Liberated Regions during a few months from February 19, 1920.
