= Germaine Poinso-Chapuis =

French politician (1901–1981)

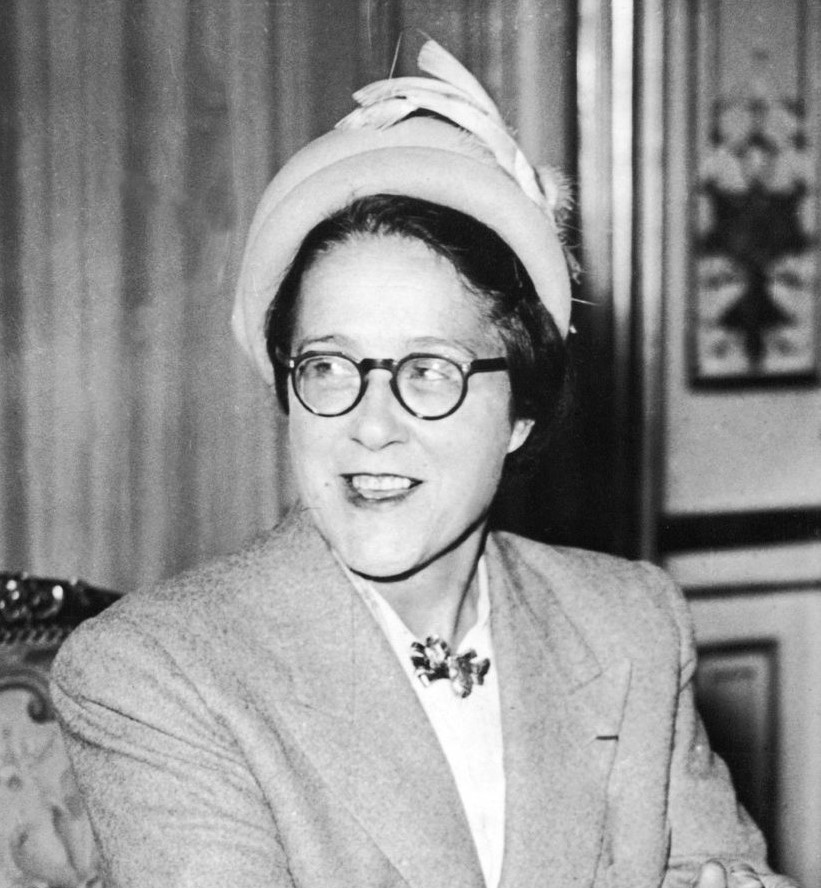
- Germaine Poinso-Chapuis in 1947

Minister for Public Health and Population
- In office November 1947 – July 1948
- Preceded by: Robert Prigent
- Succeeded by: Pierre Schneiter

Personal details
- Born: 6 March 1901 Marseille
- Died: 20 February 1981 (aged 79) Marseille
- Party: Popular Republican Movement
- Domestic partner: Henri Poinso
- Occupation: Lawyer

Germaine Poinso-Chapuis (6 March 1901, Marseille, Bouches-du-Rhône – 20 February 1981) was a French politician. She was the first woman to hold a Cabinet-level post in the French government. Her political convictions have been characterized as bearing the influence of both Catholic and feminist traditions.

== Political career ==
Born Germaine Chapuis in the Bouches-du-Rhône district of Marseille, Poinso-Chapuis was one of the first women in the city to qualify and practice as a lawyer, passing the bar in 1921. She became active in the movement for women's suffrage in the 1930s. A Christian Democrat by conviction, she became an early member of the Parti démocrate populaire (PDP), the precursor to the Popular Republican Movement (MRP). Within the PDP she campaigned to increase political representation of women. During the Second World War, she was involved in the French Resistance. It was with the MRP that she entered the constituent parliament in 1945, winning election to the seat for her native Bouches-du-Rhône. Then, she was re-elected for the second constituent parliament of 1946, and in November 1946, during the legislative elections, she was elected member of the National Assembly (France), still as a deputy of Bouches-du-Rhône. She remained an advocate for women's rights throughout her career, arguing in 1946 for a change in regulations to allow women to serve as judges.

Poinso-Chapuis was in November 1947 appointed to the ministry of Public Health and Population in the government of Robert Schuman. In the month before the government fell, Poinso-Chapuis brought in a decree which gave an allowance to every parent of a French school child. She remained the only woman to have served as a minister of France until 1974, when Simone Veil took over the same portfolio.

=== The "Poinso-Chapuis decree" ===
In post Poinso-Chapuis introduced a number of measures, including to extend the provision of vaccination and to enhance the status of nurses. However, her name was most associated with a measure nicknamed the "décret Poinso-Chapuis". The May 1948 decree by Prime Minister Schuman, proposed to grant non-state family associations permission to receive public funds to be spent on child welfare provisions irrespective of whether the children were enrolled in secular state schools or in church-financed institutions.

The measure proved intensely controversial, with Education Minister Édouard Depreux claiming that it was invalid without his signature. Though the Council of State ruled that the measure was legal, its implementation was temporarily suspended. The affair proved poisonous both to Poinso-Chapuis's ministerial career and to the government of Schuman, who was shortly afterward replaced as Prime Minister (albeit only for a month) by the Radical André Marie. Poinso-Chapuis too, although she had never formally signed the decree, lost her post over the affair, being replaced by Pierre Schneiter.

Poinso-Chapuis nonetheless remained a member of the National Assembly, winning reelection in the 1951 elections. For the remainder of her career she voted largely with the MRP party line.

== Personal life ==
Poinso-Chapuis was married in 1937 to Henri Poinso, a fellow lawyer, with whom she had two children.

== Legacy ==
Several places are named after her, including a street in Poitiers and a technical high-school in Marseille.

== Honours ==
- Legion of Honour
- Resistance Medal
- Ordre de la Santé publique
