= Saint-Bonnet-de-Chavagne =

- Commune
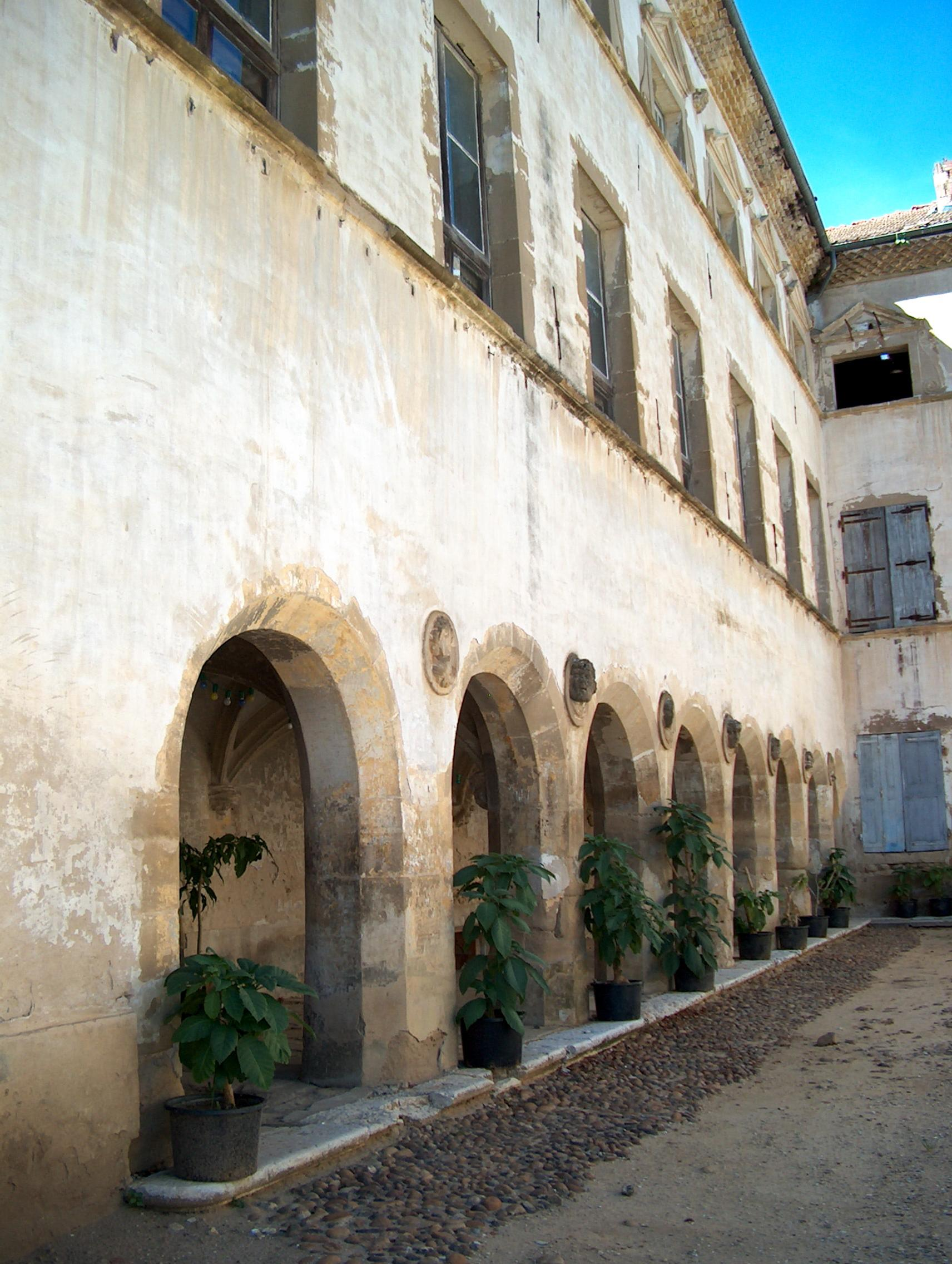
- Renaissance gallery of the Château de l'Arthaudière
- Location of Saint-Bonnet-de-Chavagne
- Location within France Location within Auvergne-Rhône-Alpes
- Coordinates: 45°07′36″N 5°13′57″E
- Country: France
- Region: Auvergne-Rhône-Alpes
- Department: Isère
- Arrondissement: Grenoble
- Canton: Le Sud Grésivaudan
- Intercommunality: Saint-Marcellin Vercors Isère

Government
  - Mayor (2020–2026): Jean-Claude Darlet
- Area^{1}: 15.18 km^{2} (5.86 sq mi)
- Elevation: 320 m (1,050 ft)
- Highest elevation: 388 m (1,273 ft)
- Lowest elevation: 160 m (520 ft)
- Population (2023): 655
  - Density: 43.1/km^{2} (112/sq mi)
- Time zone: UTC+01:00 (CET)
  - Summer (DST): UTC+02:00 (CEST)
- INSEE/Postal code: 38370 /38840
- ^{1} French Land Register data, which excludes lakes, ponds, glaciers > 1 km^{2} (0.386 sq mi or 247 acres) and river estuaries.

Saint-Bonnet-de-Chavagne (French pronunciation: [sɛ̃ bɔnɛ də ʃavaɲ]) is a commune in the Isère department in southeastern France. The 13th-18th century Château de l'Arthaudière is situated in the commune.

== Population ==
Historical population
Year	Pop.	±% p.a.
1968	398	—
1975	380	−0.66%
1982	372	−0.30%
1990	378	+0.20%
1999	449	+1.93%
2007	600	+3.69%
2012	646	+1.49%
2017	634	−0.37%
2023	655	+0.54%
Source: INSEE

== See also ==
- Communes of the Isère department
