= Émile Lisbonne =

French politician (1876–1947)

Minister of Health
- In office 26 October 1933 – 26 November 1933
- Prime Minister: Albert Sarraut
- Preceded by: Charles Daniélou
- Succeeded by: Alexandre Israël

Minister of Health
- In office 30 January 1934 – 9 February 1934
- Prime Minister: Édouard Daladier
- Preceded by: Alexandre Israël
- Succeeded by: Louis Marin

Personal details
- Born: 20 June 1876 Nyons, Drôme, France
- Died: 21 December 1947 (aged 71) Paris, France
- Occupation: Lawyer

Émile Lisbonne (20 June 1876 – 21 December 1947) was a French lawyer and Radical politician. He was briefly Minister of Health in 1933, and again for a few days in 1934.

== Early years ==
Émile Lisbonne was born on 20 June 1876 in Nyons, Drôme. He was a relative of Eugène Lisbonne, an attorney and senator for Hérault who was Senate rapporteur for the 1881 law on freedom of the press. His father was Jules Lisbonne, an attorney in Nyons, municipal councilor and deputy mayor. Émile Lisbonne attended the lycée in Avignon, then studied at the Faculty of Law in Aix-en-Provence and the Faculty of Law in Paris.

Lisbonne's father died in 1900 and he had to support his mother and two sisters. He became a prosecutor, and served in various different courts in France. He enlisted in the army at the start of World War I (1914–18) and served with bravery. As a magistrate he was sometimes called to sit on military tribunals, and was shocked by some of the expedient judgments. As a senator he would be rapporteur of a bill to establish a special court of military justice.

== National politics ==
Lisbonne ran in the by-election on 6 January 1924 that followed the death of the senator for the Drôme, and was elected in the second round of voting. He sat with the Democratic and Radical Left and Radical Socialist group. After his election he was named honorary vice-president of the tribunal of the Seine. He was reelected in the first round on 20 October 1929. He was chosen Minister of Health in the first ministry of Albert Sarraut on 27 October 1933. The ministry fell on 24 November 1933. Lisbonne was Minister of Health in the cabinet of Édouard Daladier that took office on 30 January 1934. It was replaced after a few days by the Doumerge cabinet of 9 February 1934.

Lisbonne was one of the few left-wing Radicals in the senate. Later he left the Radical party and joined the socialists. He was one of the few senators who gave their support to the Popular Front in 1936. He was defeated in the elections of 23 October 1938.

== Later career ==
Lisbonne continued to serve in the general council of the Drôme as representative for Buis-les-Baronnies. During World War II (1939–45) the Vichy regime dissolved the general councils. Lisbonne, who was closely associated with the left, was placed under house arrest in Aveyron. He returned to the Drôme after the Liberation of France. In 1947 he was named a member of the Superior Council of the Magistracy. Lisbonne died in Paris on 21 December 1947 at the age of 71.

== Publications ==
- Émile Lisbonne (1937). preface. Plaie hideuse. By Jules Blanc (in French). Paris: Éditions du Semeur. p. 176.
- Émile Lisbonne (1938). preface. La Société des nations et les émigrés politiques, gardes blancs, espions et territoristes autour de l'Office Nansen. By Léo Lambert (in French). Paris: Imprimerie coopérative Étoile; Éditions universelles. p. 36.
- Émile Lisbonne. preface. Der Völkerbund und die politischen Fluchtlinge, Weissgardisten, Spione und Terroristen im schatten des Nansen-amtes. By Léo Lambert. (in German). Paris: Editions universelles. p. 40.

== Sources ==
- Jolly, Jean (1960–1977). "LISBONNE (Émile)". Dictionnaire des parlementaires français (1889–1940) (in French). Paris: Presses universitaires de France. ISBN 2-1100-1998-0.
- Laget, Jean (2015). "Ministres drômois: Émile Lisbonne". Études Drômoises (in French).
- Larmour, Peter J. (1964). The French Radical Party in the 1930s. Stanford University Press. ISBN 978-0-8047-0206-5.
- "LISBONNE Emile" (in French). Senate of France.
- Réau, Elisabeth du (1993-05-27). Edouard Daladier: (1884-1970). Fayard. ISBN 978-2-213-66411-8.
