= Alexandre Israël =

French politician (1868–1937)

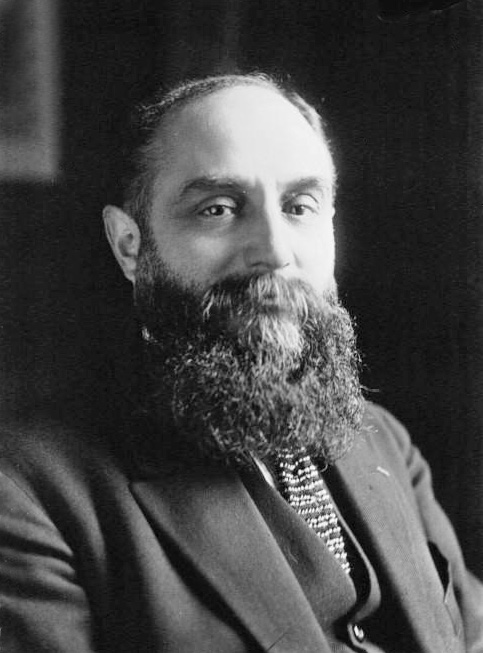
- Alexandre Israël in 1919

Minister of Health
- In office 26 November 1933 – 31 January 1934
- Prime Minister: Camille Chautemps
- Preceded by: Émile Lisbonne
- Succeeded by: Émile Lisbonne

Personal details
- Born: 25 November 1868 Algiers, Algeria
- Died: 23 August 1937 (aged 68) Paris, France

Alexandre Israël (25 November 1868 – 23 August 1937) was a French politician who was a deputy from 1919 to 1924, then a senator from 1927 to 1937. He was Minister of Health in 1932–33.

== Life ==
Alexandre Israël was born in Algiers on 25 November 1868. He was raised in Reims. He became a journalist at the age of seventeen, and soon became chief editor of the Eclaireur de l'Est. He worked as political director for a large news agency and for a newspaper in Paris. He then worked with Gaston Arbouin, deputy for the Aube, on the Petit Troyen. He became director of this newspaper in 1907 on the death of Arbouin, and remained with it for the rest of his life.

Israël was elected deputy for the Aube on the Republican Union list on 16 November 1919. He was defeated in the elections of 11 May 1924. However, Édouard Herriot appointed him secretary-general of the presidency of the council from 14 June 1924 to 17 April 1925, director of the office of the president of the Chamber of Deputies from 22 April 1925 to 19 July 1926, and again secretary-general of the presidency of the council from 19–23 July 1926. He was chief of staff of the office of the Minister of Education in the second cabinet of Raymond Poincaré from 23 July 1926.

Israël was defeated in the second round of a 1927 by-election for senator for the Aube. In another Senate by-election on 25 September 1927 he was elected in the second round. He was reelected on 20 October 1929 and held office until his death. Herriot appointed him under-secretary of state for the Interior from 3 June 1932 to 18 December 1932, and he retained this position in the cabinet of Joseph Paul-Boncour until 31 January 1933. In these two cabinets he served under Camille Chautemps, the Minister of the Interior. Israël was appointed Minister of Health in the Chautemps cabinet from 26 November 1933 to 30 January 1934. He died of heart disease in Paris on 23 August 1937.

== Publications ==
- Israël, Alexandre, ed. (1912), L'Événement, Paris
- Ferry, Jules; Israël, Alexandre (1931), L'école de la République, Édouard Herriot, preface, Paris: libr. Hachette, p. 274
- Israël, Alexandre (1934), La Reforme de l'État devant les partis, Paris: J. Ferenczi et fils, p. 85
- Israël, Alexandre (1934), La dissolution, pourquoi, comment, Paris: libr. Hachette, p. 228.
- Israël, Alexandre (1936), La Dissolution ? Voici..., Paris, p. 128
- Israël, Alexandre (1936), La liberté de la presse: hier et demain, Paris: Hachette, p. 174

== Sources ==
- Jolly, Jean (1960–1977). "Israël (Alexandre)". Dictionnaire des parlementaires français; notices biographiques sur les ministres, députés et sénateurs français de 1889 à 1940 (in French). Paris: Presses universitaires de France. ISBN 2-1100-1998-0.
