= Raymond Grasset =

French politician (1892–1968)

- Born: 10 January 1892; Riom, Puy-de-Dôme, France
- Died: 8 February 1968 (aged 76); Clermont-Ferrand, Puy-de-Dôme, France

Raymond Grasset (10 January 1892 - 8 February 1968) was a French politician. He began his career as a physician. He was the Secretary (or Minister) of Family and Health from 18 April 1942 to 20 August 1944.
