= Francisque Gay =

French editor, politician and diplomat

- Born: 2 May 1885; Roanne, Loire, France
- Died: 22 October 1963 (aged 78); Paris, France
- Occupation: Editor
- Known for: Ambassador to Canada

Francisque Gay (2 May 1885 – 22 October 1963) was a French editor, politician and diplomat. He was committed to the Catholic Church and to Christian democracy. He ran the Bloud et Gay publishing house for many years, and edited the influential journals La Vie Catholique (Catholic Life) and l'Aube (The Dawn). He helped publish clandestine journals during the German occupation of France in World War II (1939–45). After the war he was a deputy from 1945 to 1951, and participated in three cabinets in 1945–46.

== Early years ==
Francisque Gay was born on 2 May 1885 in Roanne, Loire, son of a plumbing contractor. He was educated by the Marists of Charlieu, then by the Lazarists of Lyon. In 1903, when he was aged 18, Gay helped at the national congress of the Cercles d'études (Study Circles) in Lyon. There he was impressed by the views of Marc Sangnier, founder of Le Sillon (The Furrow). He went to Paris to visit Sangnier at his home on the boulevard Raspail and to offer his help with Le Sillon. He was deeply influenced by Sangnier's views on Social Catholicism, and founded a branch of Le Sillon in Roanne. He contributed to Le Sillon's journal, Démocratie.

Gay became more deeply involved in Catholicism, and in 1905 entered the Major Seminary of Francheville. He left when the seminary closed in December 1906 and moved to Paris, where he studied at the Sorbonne faculty of letters. He then moved to Montpellier where he was accepted as an English teacher by a religious college.

== Publisher ==
In 1909 Gay abandoned teaching and obtained a job with Bloud & Cie, a publisher. He had met one of the owners, Edmond Bloud, through Le Sillon. Henri Bloud, Edmond's brother and co-owner of the publishing house, retired on 29 April 1911. He sold part of his share to Edmond Bloud, who now owned 60% of the enterprise, and part to Francisque Gay, who now owned 40%. The company name was changed to "Bloud et Gay". On 20 May 1911 Gay married Blanche Marie Fromillon. They would have six children. On 30 December 1922 Bloud & Gay became a société anonyme, a publicly held company. Edmond Bloud was active in politics, and from 1924 reduced his involvement in the company to one day per week.

In the 1920s and 1930s Gay was one of the leading polemicists for the Christian democratic movement. In 1924 he joined the Popular Democratic Party (Parti démocrate populaire, PDP). That year he launched the weekly La Vie Catholique (Catholic Life). In 1926 La Vie Catholique defended Pope Pius XI's condemnation of the far-right Action Française. On 1 January 1927 the Pope sent a telegram to Gay thanking him for the courage of La Vie catholique. In 1927 Gay founded the Volontaires du Pape (Volunteers of the Pope) to disseminate Social Catholicism throughout Europe, and arranged a large pilgrimage to Rome with this organization in 1929.

Gay also founded L'Almanach catholique, then in 1932 L'Aube (The Dawn). L'Aube presented Christian democratic views, and was notable for the editorials of Georges Bidault. In 1938 Gay and Bidault, who also belonged to the PDP, founded the New French Team (Nouvelles Equipes Françaises, NEF). The purpose was to pull together Christian Democrats against the rising dangers of Fascism. Gay's journalistic activity was reduced with the approach of World War II (1939–45). La Vie catholique was closed in 1938 and L'Aube closed in June 1940.

== World War II ==
Francisque Gay became active in the French Resistance, using the Lyon and Paris premises of his publishing house as a base. He helped publish the clandestine reviews La France continue and Les cahiers politiques. In March 1944 he escaped arrest by the Gestapo and went into hiding until the Liberation of Paris in August 1944. L'Aube reappeared on 23 August 1944 during the height of the Paris uprising. In November 1944 Gay, Georges Bidault and others founded the Popular Republican Movement (Mouvement Républicain Populaire, MRP). Also in November 1944 Gay was appointed to the Provisional Consultative Assembly and was made a member of the committees on National Education and on Information and Propaganda. Gay was appointed head of the Press department of the Ministry of Information.

== Later career ==
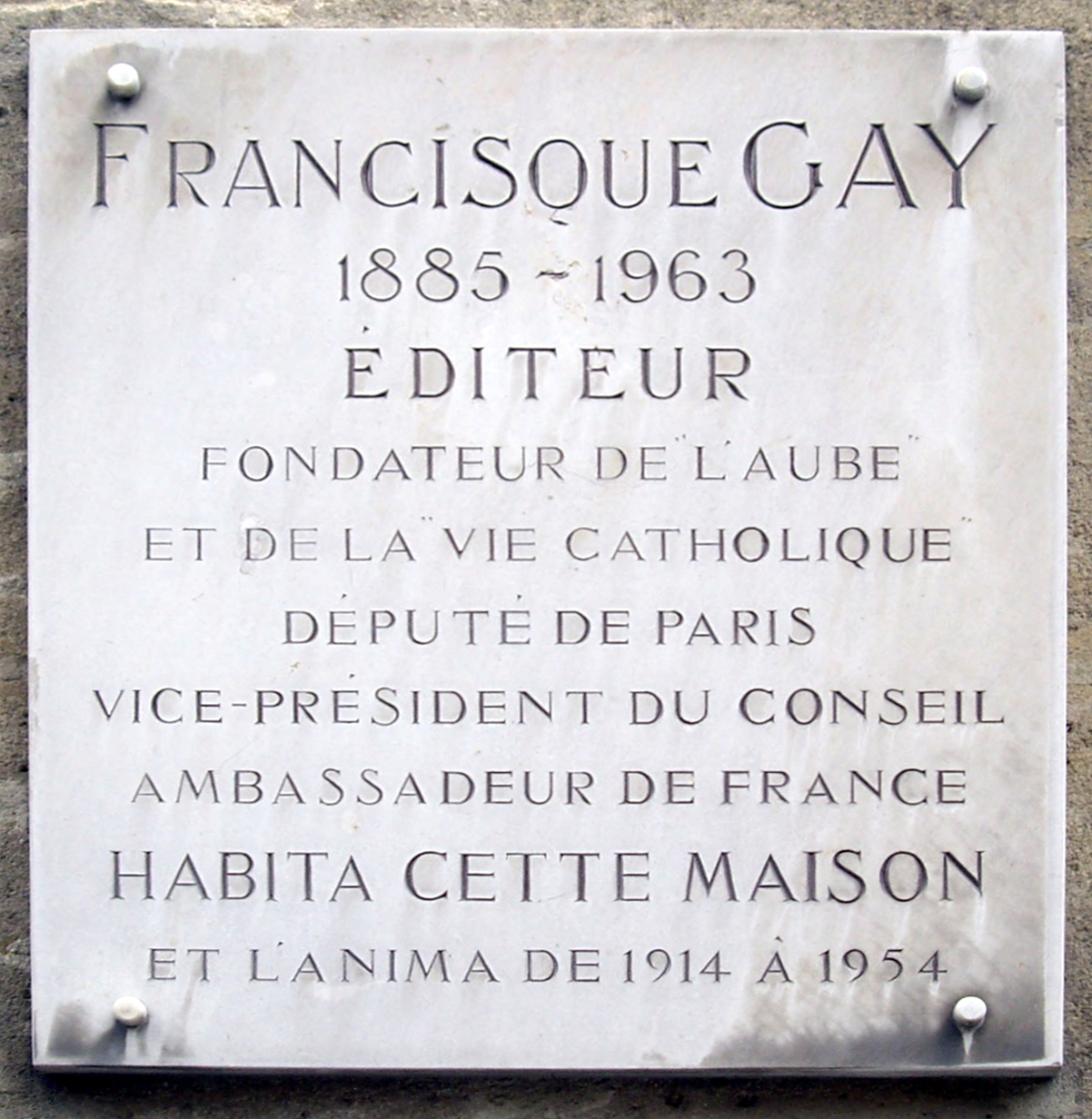
Plaque at 3 Rue Garancière, Paris 6e, Seat of Bloud & Cie, which became Bloud & Gay in 1911

Gay was elected to the first National Constituent Assembly on the MRP platform for the first district of the Seine. He voted against the draft constitution of 19 April 1946. He was reelected to the second National Constituent Assembly and voted for the draft constitution of 28 September 1946, which was ratified by a popular referendum. Gay was deputy for the Seine from 1946 to 1951. He was Minister of State from 21 November 1945 to 26 January 1946 in the cabinet of Charles de Gaulle. He was Vice-President of the Council (Deputy Prime Minister) from 26 January 1946 to 24 June 1946. He was again Minister of State from 24 June 1946 to 16 December 1946 in the cabinet of Georges Bidault. Gay was ambassador to Canada from April 1948 to October 1949.

Gay became disillusioned with politics. He felt that the MRP was too conservative, particularly on colonial issues. He did not stand for reelection in July 1951, but returned to his publishing business, He sold this business in 1954 to Desclée et Cie. He died in Paris on 23 October 1963 after suffering a heart attack.

== Publications ==
- Francisque Gay (1927). Comment j'ai défendu le pape (in French). Paris: Bloud et Gay, Editions de la Vie catholique.
- Francisque Gay (1919). Bolchevisme et découverte (in French). librairie de "La Démocratie. p. 34.
- Francisque Gay (1921). L'Irlande et la Société des Nations (in French). impr. Euvrard-Pichat.
- Francisque Gay (1927). Non, l'Action française n'a bien servi ni l'Église ni la France (in French). Bloud et Gay.
- Francisque Gay (1935). Pour un rassemblement des forces démocratiques d'inspiration chrétienne (in French). Paris: Bloud et Gay. p. 128.
- Francisque Gay (1936). Dans les flammes et dans le sang (in French). Paris: Bloud et Gay. p. 160.
- Francisque Gay (1937). Pour en finir avec la légende : Rouges-chrétiens (in French). Paris: Éditions de l'Aube. p. 288.
- Francisque Gay (1938). La Tchécoslovaquie devant notre conscience et devant l'Histoire (in French). éditions de l'Aube.
- Francisque Gay (1944). Éléments d'une politique de presse (in French). p. 36.
- Francisque Gay (1949). Canada, XX^{e} siècle (in French). Paris: Bloud et Gay. p. 205.
- Francisque Gay (1951). Les Démocrates d'inspiration chrétienne à l'épreuve du pouvoir (in French). Paris: Bloud et Gay. p. 128.

== Sources ==
- Ducerf, Laurent (2010). "Les jeunes des Nouvelles Équipes Internationales, entre jeune Europe et nouvelle chrétienté". Histoire@Politique (in French). 1 (10): 6. doi:10.3917/hp.010.00103.
- La documentation française (2005). "Francisque GAY". Dictionnaire des parlementaires français de 1940 à 1958 (in French).
- "Liste chronologique des ambassadeurs" (in French). Ambassade de France à Ottawa.
- Péréon, Anne-Lise (1992). "La Librairie Bloud et Gay entre 1911 et 1939" (in French). Archived from the original on 2016-03-03.
- Pietri, Luce; Vauchez, André; Mayeur, Jean-Marie; Venard, Marc (1990-11-01). Guerres mondiales et totalitarismes (1914-1958): Histoire du christianisme (in French). Mame-Desclée. ISBN 978-2-7189-0740-6.
- Rauch, R. William (2012-12-06). Politics and Belief in Contemporary France: Emmanuel Mounier and Christian Democracy, 1932–1950. Springer Science & Business Media. ISBN 978-94-011-9380-1.
