= Joseph Arthaud =

French psychiatrist, physician and professor (1813–1883)

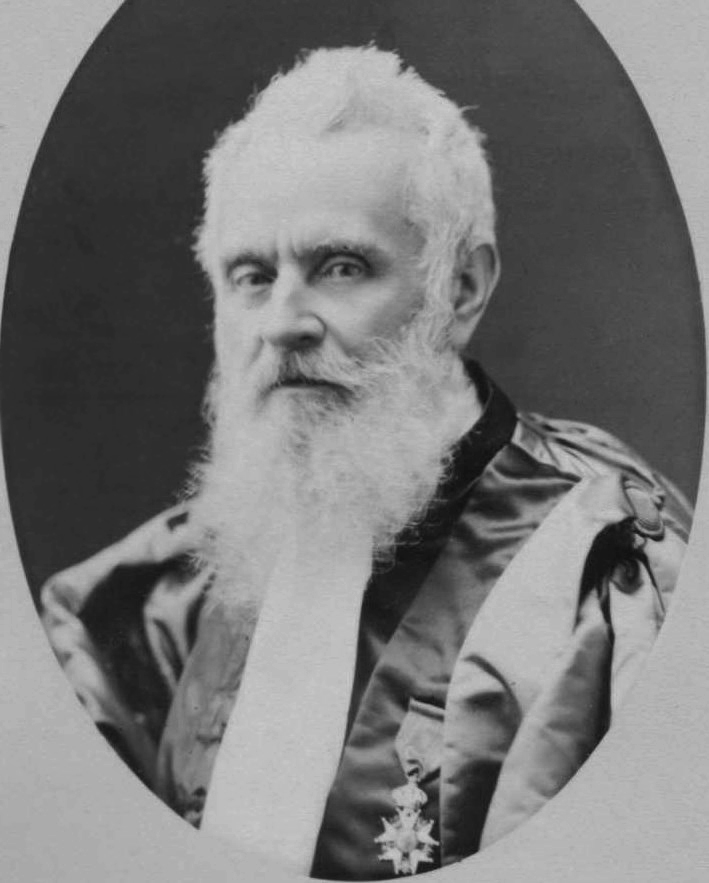
- Joseph Arthaud
- Born: 13 June 1813; Lyon, France
- Died: 17 March 1883 (aged 69); Lyon, France
- Scientific career
- Fields: psychiatry

Joseph Arthaud (13 June 1813 – 17 March 1883), was a French psychiatrist, medical doctor and professor.

== Life ==
Joseph Arthaud was of an unknown father in 1813. His mother, who was a manager of an embroidery workshop in Lyon, brought him up and encouraged his studies. Being too young to be accepted in philosophy class at Collège-lycée Ampère, he attended the medical school, then obtained his philosophy doctorate. He worked at a hospital in Lyons to improve the care of patients. He write numerous articles about psychiatric disorders and care.

He married Marie Girard (1814-1891) in 1838, they had four children, Françoise, Pothin, Claude and Emmanuel.

== Published works ==
- Du siège et de la nature des maladies mentales. (Thèse). Édition, Paris, 22 août 1835
- Examen médico-légal des faits relatifs au procès criminel de Jobard, Paris, V. Masson, 1852
- Observations de crétinisme, Lyon, impr. A. Vingtrinier, 1854
- Réflexions sur l'état mental de C. Feuillet, condamné par la cour d'assises pour crimes d'empoisonnement, Lyon, impr. A. Vingtrinier, 1854
- Relation d'une hystéro-démonopathie épidémique observée à Morzine (Haute-Savoie), Lyon, impr. A. Vingtrinier, seconde édition, 1862
- De la possibilité et de la convenance de faire sortir certaines catégories d'aliénés des asiles spéciaux et de les placer soit dans des exploitations agricoles, soit dans leurs propres familles, lu au Congrès médical de Lyon, le 1er octobre 1864, Lyon, impr. Vingtrinier, 1865
- De l'état mental des épileptiques au point de vue médico-légal, Lyon, impr. A. Vingtrinier, 1867
- De l'Assistance publique des malades à domicile et dans les hôpitaux, Lyon, impr. A. Vingtrinier, 1868
- Du Bromure de potassium dans le traitement de l'épilepsie, Lyon, impr. A. Vingtrinier, 1870
- L'Asile départemental de Bron, Lyon, impr. A. Vingtrinier, 1874
