= Saint-Romain-la-Motte =

- Commune
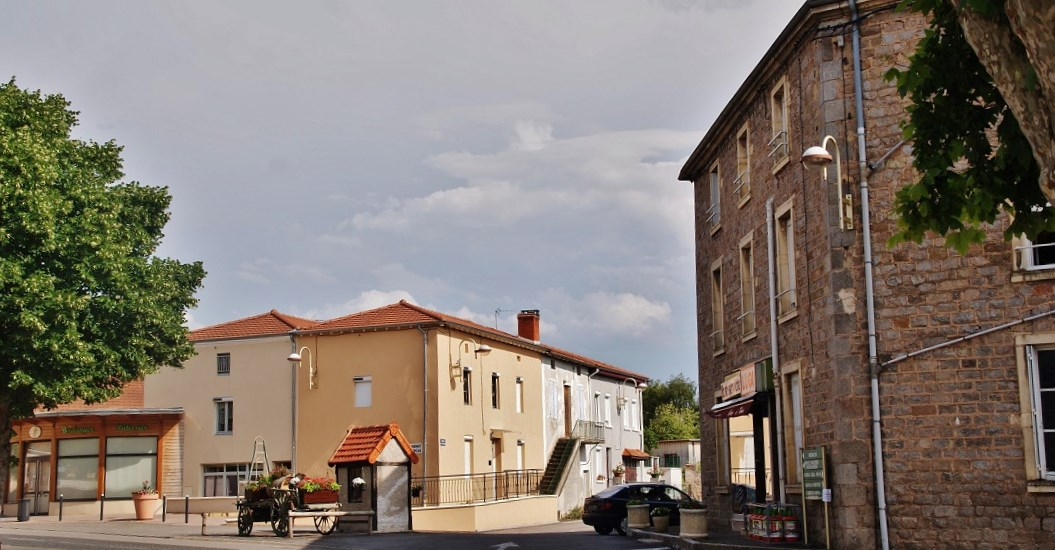

- Coat of arms
- Location of Saint-Romain-la-Motte
- Location within France Location within Auvergne-Rhône-Alpes
- Coordinates: 46°05′07″N 3°58′56″E
- Country: France
- Region: Auvergne-Rhône-Alpes
- Department: Loire
- Arrondissement: Roanne
- Canton: Renaison
- Intercommunality: Roannais Agglomération

Government
  - Mayor (2020–2026): Gilbert Varrenne
- Area^{1}: 27.56 km^{2} (10.64 sq mi)
- Highest elevation: 361 m (1,184 ft)
- Lowest elevation: 290 m (950 ft)
- Population (2023): 1,436
  - Density: 52.10/km^{2} (135.0/sq mi)
- Time zone: UTC+01:00 (CET)
  - Summer (DST): UTC+02:00 (CEST)
- INSEE/Postal code: 42284 /42640
- ^{1} French Land Register data, which excludes lakes, ponds, glaciers > 1 km^{2} (0.386 sq mi or 247 acres) and river estuaries.

Saint-Romain-la-Motte (French pronunciation: [sɛ̃ ʁɔmɛ̃ la mɔt]) is a commune in the Loire department in central France.

== Population ==
Historical population
Year	Pop.	±% p.a.
1968	842	—
1975	887	+0.75%
1982	1,081	+2.87%
1990	1,352	+2.84%
1999	1,395	+0.35%
2007	1,514	+1.03%
2012	1,505	−0.12%
2017	1,434	−0.96%
2023	1,436	+0.02%
Source: INSEE

== See also ==
- Communes of the Loire department
