= René Arthaud =

French politician (1915–2007)

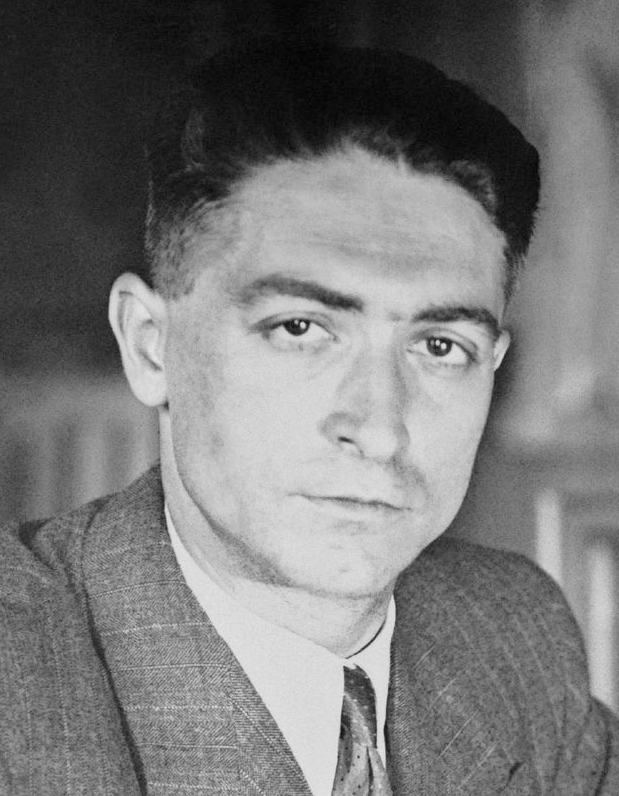
- Arthaud in 1946
- Born: 20 September 1915; Marseille, France
- Died: 21 July 2007 (aged 91)
- Political party: French Communist Party
- Parent: Rodolphe Arthaud

René Arthaud (20 September 1915 - 21 July 2007) was a French politician. He served as a member of the National Assembly from 1946 to 1951, representing Vaucluse. He was also the Minister of Public Health from 24 June 1946 to 16 December 1946.

== Biography ==
René Arthaud was the son of Jeanne Ravel and Eli Rodolphe Arthaud, originally from Orpierre (Hautes-Alpes), who was a radical general councilor for this canton, deputy mayor of Gap, and president of the Hautes-Alpes general council. After completing his secondary education in Gap, Marseille, and Paris, René Arthaud chose to study pharmacy and graduated from the University of Marseille in 1941. However, at the age of 19, in 1934, he had joined the Federal Union of Students and the Communist Youth Movement and served as a delegate to the World Student Congress in Brussels. In 1936, he became a member of the Communist Party and editor of the newspaper Rouge-Midi.

Mobilized in 1939 at the hospital in Bar-le-Duc, he was in Laon on May 10, 1940. After defeat and demobilization, he completed his studies and resumed the underground struggle in Avignon, where he established himself as a pharmacist. René Arthaud organized the National Front (French Resistance) in Vaucluse and represented the Communist Party on the departmental liberation committee.
