= Louis Pasteur Vallery-Radot =

French physician and writer

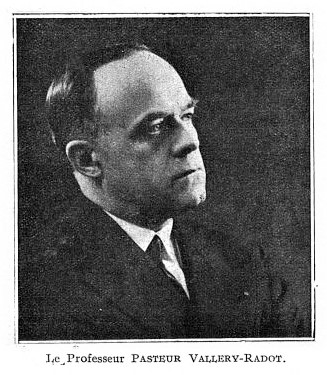
Vallery-Radot in 1940

Louis Pasteur Vallery-Radot (3 May 1886 – 9 October 1970) was a French physician, biographer of his grandfather Louis Pasteur and editor of Pasteur's complete works. In 1936 he was elected as a member of the Académie Nationale de Médecine.

Preceded by Édouard Estaunié	Seat 24 of the Académie française 1944–1970	Succeeded by Étienne Wolff
