= Robert Prigent =

French politician (1910–1995)

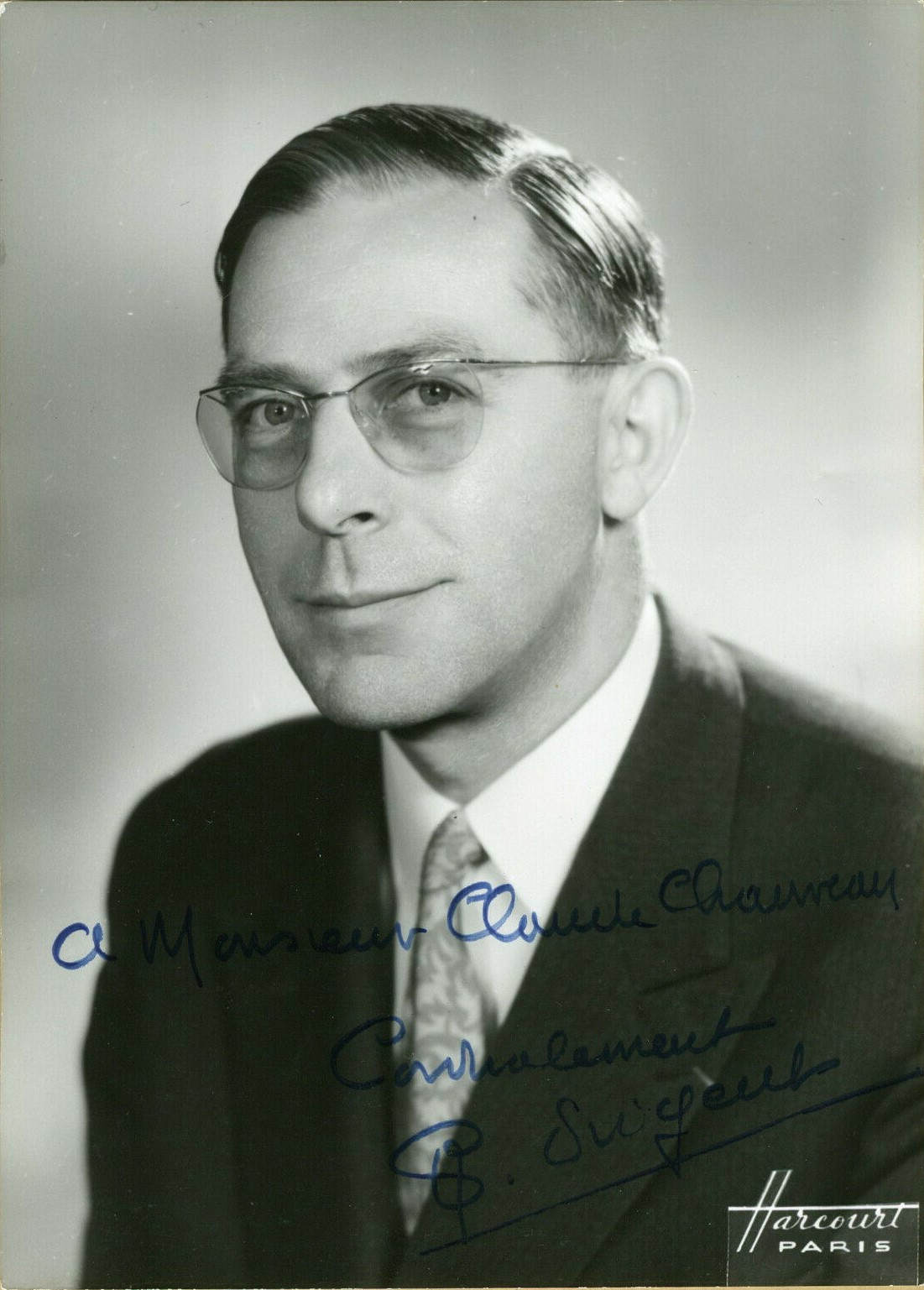
- Born: 24 November 1910; Saint-Pol-sur-Mer, Nord, France
- Died: 13 July 1995 (aged 84); Paris, France
- Political party: Mouvement républicain populaire

Robert Prigent (French pronunciation: [ʁɔbɛʁ pʁiʒɑ̃]; 24 November 1910 - 13 July 1995) was a French politician. He served as a member of the National Assembly from 1945 to 1951 for the Mouvement républicain populaire, representing Nord. He was also the Minister of Population and Public Health from 1945 to 1947.
