= French Social Party =

French Social Party French: Parti Social Français
- President: François de La Rocque
- Founded: 10 January 1936
- Dissolved: 10 July 1940; 85 years ago
- Preceded by: Croix-de-Feu
- Succeeded by: Republican Social Party of French Reconciliation
- Headquarters: Rue de Milan, Paris
- Newspaper: Le Petit Journal; Le Flambeau
- Membership (1940): 350,000
- Ideology: French nationalism Social Catholicism; National conservatism Corporatism; Right-wing populism Anti-communism
- Political position: Right-wing to far-right
- Colours: Black

The French Social Party (French: Parti social français, PSF) was a French nationalist political party led by François de La Rocque from 1936 to 1940. La Rocque established the PSF after the dissolution of his Croix-de-Feu, a far-right league banned by the Popular Front government, with a more moderate and democratic ideology. The PSF was France's first right-wing mass party and experienced considerable initial success until it disappeared in the wake of the Fall of France in 1940. The PSF was not refounded after the Second World War, but the Republican Social Party of French Reconciliation was established in 1945 as a spiritual successor by former PSF members and it prefigured the rise of Gaullism after the war.

== Background and origins (1927–36) ==
La Rocque envisioned the PSF as the more explicitly-political successor of the Croix-de-Feu, the World War I veterans' organization that had been founded in 1927 and, by the early 1930s, had emerged as the largest and one of the most influential of interwar France's numerous far-right leagues. Though the Croix-de-Feu had adopted as its slogan "Social d'abord" ("Social First") as a counter to the "Politique d'abord" ("Politics First") of Action Française, it espoused the political goals elaborated by La Rocque in his tract Service Public, including social Catholic corporatism, the institution of a minimum wage and paid vacations (congés payés), women's suffrage and the reform of parliamentary procedure. The party's programme would further develop the same themes by advocating "the association of capital and labour", a traditional platitude of French conservatism, and the reform of France's political institutions along presidential lines to bolster the stability and authority of the state.

Though the Croix-de-Feu participated in the demonstrations of 6 February 1934, La Rocque forbade its members from involving themselves in the subsequent riot, thus demonstrating a respect for republican legality that the PSF would also uphold as one of its essential political principles. La Rocque, who had previously maintained a certain mystique with regard to his attitude towards the Republic, explicitly rallied to it and denounced in a speech on 23 May 1936 totalitarianism (both Nazi and Soviet) along with racism (with regard to which he explicitly rejected anti-Semitism) and class struggle, as the principal obstacles to "national reconciliation".

Nevertheless, critics of the left and centre denounced the Croix-de-Feu, together with the other leagues, as fascist organizations. A desire to defend the republic was not their sole motivation. Politicians of the centre-right and left alike opposed La Rocque because of the perceived threat of his success in mobilising a mass base within their traditional particularly working-class constituencies.

The disruptive nature of the leagues' activities made Pierre Laval's government outlaw paramilitary groups on 6 December 1935. Although that decision was succeeded by the law of 10 January 1936 regulating militias and combat organizations, the law was only partially implemented. Of all the leagues, only Action Française was dissolved, and the Croix-de-Feu was allowed to continue its activities essentially unimpeded. After the victory of the Popular Front, which had included in its electoral programme a promise to dissolve the right-wing leagues in the parliamentary elections of May 1936, the government issued a decree banning the Croix-de-Feu, along with the Mouvement social français, on 18 June. Within weeks, on 7 July, La Rocque founded the French Social Party to succeed the defunct league.

== Political success and co-operation (1936–40) ==
=== Organisation and mass mobilisation ===
The PSF inherited the large popular base of the Croix-de-Feu (450,000 members in June, 1936, most of them having joined since 1934) and, mirroring the contemporary Popular Front, achieved considerable success in mobilizing it through a variety of associated organizations: sporting societies, labour organizations and leisure and vacation camps. PSF members also orchestrated the development of "professional unions" (syndicats professionels), envisioned as a means of organising management against labour militancy, which espoused class collaboration and claimed 1,000,000 members by 1938.

Unlike established right-wing parties such as the Republican Federation and Democratic Alliance, which had traditionally lacked a formal membership structure and relied instead on the support of notables, the PSF aggressively courted an extensive membership among the middle and lower classes. By 1940, the PSF had become not only France's first right-wing mass party but also the nation's largest party in terms of membership: over 700,000 members (and more than a million according to some historians), it eclipsed even the traditionally mass-based Socialist (SFIO) and Communist Parties (202,000 and 288,000 members, respectively, in December 1936).

The party's central committee included its president, La Rocque, vice-presidents Jean Mermoz and Noël Ottavi, Edmond Barrachin, Charles Vallin, Jean Ybarnégaray, Jean Borotra, and Georges Riché. The party had two newspapers: Le Flambeau and Le Petit Journal.

The Popular Front Chamber of Deputies (1936–40). PSF deputies sat originally with the Independent Republicans group (included on this diagram as part of the right) but left it to compose their own group in 1938.

=== Electoral success ===
Six members of the nascent PSF were elected to the Chamber of Deputies in 1936, and three more were elected in by-elections between 1936 and 1939. Two deputies of other right-wing parliamentary groups defected to the party. The true measure of the party's electoral potential, however, came with the municipal elections of 1938–1939 in which it won 15% of votes nationally. As a result of the proportional representation law passed by the Chamber in June 1939, that promised to translate into approximately 100 deputies in the legislative elections planned for 1940. By 1939, the party's elected officials, its 11 deputies aside, included nearly 3000 mayors, 541 general councilors and thousands of municipal councilors.

=== Competition with established right-wing parties ===
Of all the PSF's successes, it was the party's popularity among the middle classes, the peasants, shopkeepers, and clerical workers, who had been hardest hit by the Great Depression. They generated the most fear from the left. That demographic had historically been one of the primary bastions of the Radical-Socialist Party, and its falling under the influence of the "fascist" right was viewed by Popular Front leaders as a serious threat to the stability of the republic. The PSF, for its part, actively courted the middle classes and argued that their traditional Radical defenders had abandoned them by supporting the Popular Front.

Despite that demographic threat, however, the PSF generated the most fervent hostility within the parties of the established parliamentary right, most notably the conservative Republican Federation. The tensions between the Federation and the PSF were demonstrated as early as 1937 by a Normandy by-election in which the Federation candidate, after being behind the PSF candidate in the first round, initially refused to stand down and support the latter in the runoff round. The rancor of the feuding parties, despite the Federation candidate's eventual endorsement of the PSF, resulted in the seat falling to the centre, which demonstrated to Federation and PSF leaders alike the undesirability of co-existence. Thus, although the two parties were in fact in agreement on many questions of ideology, notably their defense of the far-right leagues, the PSF was viewed by the long-established Federation as a rival "to its own electoral fortunes".

A second victim of the PSF's popularity was Jacques Doriot's far-right Parti Populaire Français (PPF), which incorporated nationalist, virulently-anticommunist and openly-fascist tendencies. Founded, like the PSF, in June 1936, the PPF enjoyed initial success and attracted a membership of 295,000, according to the party's own statistics by early 1938. With the continued growth of the PSF, however, the PPF fell into decline, which parallelled the demise of the Popular Front to which it had largely been a reaction.

In March 1937, Doriot proposed the formation of a Front de la Liberté ("Front of Liberty") with the objective of unifying the right in opposition to the Popular Front. Although the Republican Federation, followed by several small right-wing parties that stood to lose little from allying themselves to the more extremist PPF, quickly accepted Doriot's proposal, it was rejected both by the moderate Democratic Alliance and by La Rocque, who identified the Front as an attempt to "annex" the popularity of his party. His insistence on the PSF's independence got La Rocque attacked violently by other figures on the right, including former Croix-de-Feu members who had abandoned the more moderate Social Party.

=== Rapprochement with Radical Party ===
The major parties of the right fell in disarray after their electoral defeat and the strike movement of June 1936. Although the Republican Federation, at least, was consistent in its opposition to Popular Front policies, the Democratic Alliance and the small, Christian democratic Popular Democratic Party (PDP) were reluctant to criticise the government to prevent the sabotage of their efforts to lure the Radical Party into a centre-right coalition.

Thus, the Independent Radicals, gathering right-wing Radical parliamentarians, constituted the most effective opposition to the Popular Front, particularly in the Senate. With the prospect of a PSF breakthrough in the 1940 elections in mind, the Independent Radicals sought to cooperate with the new force; for their part, the PSF deputies voted confidence in Édouard Daladier's Radical government in April 1938. With the collapse of the Popular Front the PSF-Radical alliance seemed inevitable to many on the left, with the Socialist newspaper Le Populaire writing in 1938 that "the PSF-Radical bloc has become a reality of political life". However, that observation appeared premature to most contemporary observers.

== Wartime activities (1940–45) ==
The Danzig Crisis of 1939 deprived the PSF of the chance to make serious inroads in parliament. On 30 July, French Prime Minister Édouard Daladier, fearing that the imminent electoral campaign would distract the Chamber of Deputies from the business of national defence, used the decree powers granted him by the Chamber to extend its term until May 1942.

After the Fall of France and the establishment of the Vichy regime, La Rocque denounced it as defeatist and anti-Semitic, but he still proclaimed his personal loyalty to Marshal Philippe Pétain, and the PSF was renamed Progrès Social Français (French Social Progress) and took on the form of a social aid organisation because of the occupation authorities' prohibition of organised political activities.

La Rocque's attitude towards the Vichy government was initially ambiguous. As stated, he continued to affirm his loyalty to Pétain and was amenable to certain of the more moderate aspects of Vichy's reactionary program, the Révolution Nationale, notably its corporatism and social policies. The PSF further refused to recognize General Charles de Gaulle's Free French, along with the National Council of the Resistance, as the legitimate French authorities in opposition to Vichy, which also claimed constitutional legitimacy although some members of the PSF, such as Charles Vallin, joined the Free French. However, La Rocque was hostile to Vichy's enthusiastic collaboration with the Nazi occupiers and forbade PSF members from participating in Vichy-sponsored organisations such as the Service d'Ordre Légionnaire, the Milice and the Legion of French Volunteers.

In August 1940, La Rocque began actively to participate in the French Resistance by transmitting information to the British Secret Intelligence Service via Georges Charaudeau's Alibi Network (Réseau Alibi) and forming the Klan Network (Réseau Klan) in 1942 as a means of coordinating intelligence-gathering activities among PSF members. Nevertheless, he continued to believe that he could convince Pétain to abandon his collaborationist line and so he requested and was granted three meetings with the Marshal in early 1943. Two days after their last meeting, on 9 March, La Rocque was arrested by the Gestapo during a nationwide roundup of over 100 PSF leaders. Deported first to Czechoslovakia and later to Austria, he returned to France only in May 1945.

As with nearly all other political parties that had existed under the Third Republic, the PSF produced both collaborators with and resisters of the Vichy regime. In most cases, individual circumstances dictated more ambiguous loyalties and actions. Although former PSF deputy Jean Ybarnegaray, for instance, served in the first Vichy government under Pétain as Minister for Veterans and the Family, he resigned his post in 1940 and was in 1943 arrested and deported because of his efforts in helping Resistance members to cross the Pyrenees into Spain.

== Postwar legacy (1945–58) ==
=== Official continuation ===
In August 1945, after the Liberation of France, La Rocque and his remaining followers, principally Pierre de Léotard, André Portier, and Jean de Mierry, established the Parti Républicain Social de la Réconciliation Française (Social Republican Party of French Reconciliation), known generally as Réconciliation Française and intended as the official successor of the PSF. On the initiative of Léotard, the PRSRF participated in the right-wing Rally of the Republican Lefts (RGR, see sinistrisme) coalition in the elections of June 1946, November 1946, 1951 and 1956. The death of La Rocque in 1946 deprived the party of unifying leadership, however, and the prewar popularity that it had hoped to exploit never materialised. Though the PRSRF had effectively disappeared by 1956, with the schism that year of the RGR into centre-left and centre-right groups, some of its members would later continue their political careers within the conservative National Centre of Independents and Peasants (CNIP).

=== Ideological successors ===
Despite the postwar insignificance of the party itself, elements of the PSF's and La Rocque's ideology strongly influenced the political formations of right and the centre during the Fourth Republic. La Rocque had advised his followers to create "a third party, sincerely republican and very bold from a social perspective" — by which he meant Réconciliation Française within the Rally of the Republican Lefts, but for some former PSF loyalists and sympathizers, the statement applied more accurately to the newly-formed Christian democratic Popular Republican Movement (Mouvement Républicain Populaire, MRP) and, for others (notably François Mitterrand), the left-liberal Democratic and Socialist Union of the Resistance (UDSR).

PSF ideology, particularly its corporatist emphasis on the association of capital and labour and its advocacy of a strong stable presidential regime to replace the parliamentary republic, would also contribute to the development of Gaullism, culminating in the establishment of the presidential Fifth Republic in 1958. The postwar Gaullist party, the Rally of the French People (RPF), like the MRP, enthusiastically adopted the mass-based model of organization and mobilization that had been pioneered by the PSF, a sharp and permanent break from the cadre-based parties of the prewar classical right.

== Historiography ==
Historical debate over the PSF, like its predecessor, the Croix-de-Feu, has been driven by the question of whether they can be considered in at least some respects as the manifestations of a "French fascism". Most contemporary French historians, notably René Rémond, Michel Winock, Jean Lacouture and Pierre Milza, have rejected that assertion. Rémond, in his La Droite en France, identifies the PSF instead as an offshoot of the Bonapartist tradition in French right-wing politics, populist and anti-parliamentarian but hardly fascist. Milza in La France des années 30 writes that "the PSF was more anti-parliamentarian than anti-republican". More recently, Lacouture wrote, "La Rocque's movement was neither fascist nor extremist". Furthermore, Rémond identified the PSF, at least in part, as a populist and social-Catholic "antidote" to French fascism. He wrote, "Far from representing a French form of fascism in the face of the Popular Front, La Rocque helped to safeguard France from fascism" by diverting the support of the middle classes away from more extremist alternatives. Jacques Nobécourt made similar assertions: "La Rocque spared France from a pre-war experiment with totalitarianism".

The lasting confusion over the "fascist" tendencies of the PSF can be ascribed in part to two factors. Firstly, the PSF's predecessor, the Croix-de-Feu, had aspired to a paramilitary aesthetic (described by Julian Jackson as a "fascist frisson" and dismissed by Rémond as "political boy scouting for adults") outwardly similar to that employed by the more overtly fascist of the right-wing leagues. Furthermore, La Rocque continued to defend the leagues' activities even in the face of their condemnation by the parties of the established moderate right (though not the Republican Federation). Secondly, the PSF's condemnation of parliamentarism, which was considered synonymous with French republicanism by most leftist and centrist politicians, marked it as inherently anti-republican and thus "fascist" in the period's political discourse in their opinions.

A number of foreign historians, however, have questioned those defences of La Rocque and the PSF. Zeev Sternhell, criticising Rémond's classification of the PSF as Bonapartist in Neither Right Nor Left: Fascist Ideology in France, associates the party and its leader with a "revolutionary right" tradition that owes its political heritage to Boulangism and the revolutionary syndicalism of Georges Sorel. That minority view is partially shared by Robert Soucy, William D. Irvine, and Michel Dobry, who argue that the Croix-de-Feu and the PSF were partially-realized manifestations of a distinctively-French fascism, their political potential but not their tactics of organization and mobilisation, which was destroyed by the German invasion and thus permanently discredited. Sternhell, pointing to the democratic path to power followed by the Nazi Party, also made the argument that La Rocque's apparent respect for republican legality is not enough to disqualify his movement as fascist.

== See also ==
- Far right leagues
- History of far right movements in France
- Interwar France
- François de La Rocque
- Travail, Famille, Patrie, PSF motto appropriated by Vichy
