= Croix-de-Feu =

Cross of Fire French: Croix-de-Feu
- Leader: François de La Rocque
- Founded: 11 November 1927
- Dissolved: 10 January 1936
- Succeeded by: French Social Party
- Headquarters: Rue de Milan, Paris
- Newspaper: Le Flambeau
- Student wing: Groupes Universitaires
- Youth wing: Fils et Filles de Croix-de-Feu
- Women's wing: Sections Féminines
- Paramilitary wing: Volontaires Nationaux
- Membership: 15,000 (1936 est.)
- Ideology: French nationalism Corporatism
- Political position: Right-wing to far-right
- Religion: Roman Catholicism
- Colours: Black

The Croix-de-Feu (French: [kʁwa də fø], Cross of Fire) was a nationalist French league of the interwar period, led by Colonel François de la Rocque (1885–1946). After it was dissolved, as were all other leagues during the Popular Front period (1936–38), La Rocque established the Parti social français (PSF) to replace it.

== Beginnings (1927–1930) ==
The Croix-de-Feu (CF) were primarily a group of veterans of the First World War, those who had been awarded the Croix de guerre 1914–1918. The group was founded on 26 November 1927 by Maurice d'Hartoy, who led it until 1929. The honorary presidency was awarded to writer Jacques Péricard. Also in 1929, the movement acquired its newspaper, Le Flambeau. At its creation, the movement was subsidized by the wealthy perfumer François Coty and was hosted in the building of Le Figaro.

It benefited from the Catholic Church's 1926 proscription of the Action Française, which prohibited Catholics from supporting the latter. Many conservative Catholics became members of the Croix-de-feu instead, including Jean Mermoz and the young François Mitterrand.

Unlike the Unions latines, which had promoted algérianité (Algerianness) and gained the support of French settlers, the CF adopted a new approach. European settlers in Algeria tended to support authoritarian and imperialist governments over French republicanism. They were antisemitic and xenophobic. Believing that Algerian Europeans were a new race, they saw themselves as "youthful, virile and brutal" and Metropolitan France as "degenerate, effeminate and weak". They often resorted to the use of force against Muslim and Jewish Algerians.

The Croix-de-feu had a massive propaganda campaign that won thousands of members in Constantine and Algiers. It proposed an alliance with local Muslims and attacked the left. Scholars see that as a tactic to funnel extreme and separatist frustrations caused by an economic disparity between European settlers and the local Algerian people. It used different propaganda in Oran, more similar to Jules Molle and the Union's latines, because Oran had fewer Muslims and was more anti-Semitic.

== Under La Rocque (1930–1936) ==
Under Lieutenant-Colonel François de La Rocque, who took over in 1930, the Croix-de-Feu took its independence from François Coty and left the building of Le Figaro for rue de Milan. It organised popular demonstrations in reaction to the Stavisky Affair in the hope of overthrowing the Second Cartel des gauches, a left-wing coalition government. La Rocque quickly became a hero of the far right, which opposed the influences of socialism and "hidden Communism" but was sceptical about becoming counterrevolutionary.

Under la Rocque, the movement advocated a military effort against the "German danger" and supported corporatism and an alliance between capital and labour. It enlarged its base by creating several secondary associations, thus including non-veterans in its ranks. To counter the monarchist Action française and its slogan Politique d'abord! "Politics First!"), de la Rocque invented the motto Social d'abord! ("Social First!"). In his book, Le Service Public ("Public Service)", which was published in November 1934, he argued in favour of a reform of parliamentary procedures, cooperation between industries according to their branches of activities; a minimum wage and paid holidays; women's suffrage (also upheld by the monarchist Action française, which considered that women, often devout, would be more favourable to their conservative thesis) etc.

The Croix de Feu was one of the right-wing groups that pushed antisemitic politics in 1935. Along with Volontaires Nationaux and others, the Croix de Feu used the political developments in Metropolitan France like the election of Léon Blum, a Jewish prime minister, and the Popular Front to inflame anti-Semitic sentiment in the colony. The 1936 elections saw the victory of anti-Semitic municipal governments, boycotts against Jewish business (heavily promoted by the Radical Party newspaper Le Republicain de Constantine) and physical violence and attacks against Jews. The Croix de Feu acted in concert with other anti-Semitic parties, including the Rassemblement National d'Action Sociale led by Abbé Lambert, Action française and Parti Populaire français. Membership in Croix de Feu grew from 2,500 in 1933 to 8,440 in 1935 and 15,000 in 1936.

The Croix-de-Feu did not participate in the 1932 demonstrations organised by the Action française and the far-right leagues Jeunesses Patriotes against the debt payment to the United States. The Croix-de-feu, however, took part in the massive rally of 6 February 1934, which led to the toppling of the Second Cartel des gauches (Left-Wing Coalition). Still, La Rocque refused to riot, although parts of the Croix-de-Feu disagreed with him. It had circled the Palais Bourbon and remained grouped several hundred metres away from the others rioting leagues. As one of the most essential paramilitary associations and because of its anti-Semitic position, the Croix-de-Feu and La Rocque were considered by the political left to be among the most dangerous imitators of Mussolini and Hitler. However, as a result of La Rocque's actions during the riots, it subsequently lost prestige among the far-right before it was dissolved by the Popular Front government on 18 June 1936.

== Parti Social Français (1936–1940) ==
La Rocque then formed the French Social Party (PSF) as a successor to the dissolved league. Moderate estimates place the membership for the PSF at 500,000 in the buildup to the Second World War, which would make it the first French conservative mass party. Although its slogan Travail, Famille, Patrie ("Work, Family, Fatherland") was later used by Vichy France to replace the Republican slogan Liberté, Egalité, Fraternité, the party remained eclectic. The party disappeared with the Fall of France without having had the opportunity to profit from its immense popularity.

== Second World War ==
During the occupation of France, La Rocque joined the French Resistance but was the subject of considerable controversy immediately after the war.

== Political heritage ==
The Parti Social Français was France's first major conservative party (1936–1940). He advocated a presidential regime to end the instability of the parliamentary regime, an economic system founded upon "organised professions" (corporatism) and social legislation inspired by Social Christianity.

Historians now consider that he paved the way for the French Christian democratic parties: the postwar Popular Republican Movement (MRP) and the Gaullist Rally for France. The historian William D. Irvine stated:

One of the very few things historians of fascism in France can agree upon is that the Croix de Feu and its successor the Parti Social Francais (PSF) are irrelevant to their subject.

== Continuing debate ==
Historians have argued that the Croix-de-Feu were a distinctly-French variant of the European fascist movement. If the uniformed rightist "Leagues" of the 1930s did not develop into classical Fascism, it was because they represented a shading from conservative right-wing nationalism to extremist fascism, in membership and ideology, distinctive to French inter-war society.

Most contemporary French historians (René Rémond, Pierre Milza and François Sirinelli in particular) do not classify the 1930s "leagues" as a native "French Fascism", particularly the Croix-de-Feu. The organisation is described by Rémond as completely secretive about its aims with an ideology kept "as vague as possible." Rémond, the most famous and influential of these postwar historians, distinguishes "Reaction" and the far right from "revolutionary" fascism as an import into France which had few takers. In the 1968 third edition of La droite en France, his major work, he defines fascism in Europe as a

revolt of the declassés, a movement of those on half-pay, civilian and military. Everywhere it came to power through social upheavals. ... Although with a handful of fascists [in 1930s France], there was a minority of reactionaries and a great majority of conservatives.

Amongst these he places much smaller groups like the Faisceau, a tiny minority compared with the Croix-de-Feu, whose membership peaked at over a million. The Israeli historian Zeev Sternhell, on the other hand, has argued for the existence of a native French fascism and for groups like the Cercle Proudhon of the mid-to-late 1910s being among the more important ideological breeding grounds of the movement. He, however, does not include the Croix de Feu in that category:

The 'centrist' right always had its own shock troops that served its own purposes, and took good care that they did not become confused with the fascists.

Sternhell, interested in fascism as an "anti-material revision of Marxism" or an anti-capitalist, cultish, corporatist extreme nationalism, points out that groups like the Jeunesses Patriotes, the revived Ligue des Patriotes and the Croix de Feu were derided by French fascists at the time. Fascist leaders in France saw themselves as destroyers of the old order, above politics, and rejecting the corruption of capitalism. To them the Leagues were a bulwark of this corrupt regime. Robert Brasillach called them "old cuckolds of the right, these eternal deceived husbands of politics" and claimed that "the enemies of national restoration are not only on the left but first and foremost on the right."

The American journalist John Gunther in 1940 described La Rocque as a "French Fascist No. 1, the chief potential French March-on-Romer" but added that he was "a rather pallid Fascist", did not attempt to seize power during the 6 February riots and peacefully complied with the government's ban of the Croix de Feu. Other scholars, such as Robert Soucy and William D. Irvine, argue that the La Rocque and the Croix de Feu were in fact fascist and a particularly "French" fascism. La Rocque, however, if tempted by a paramilitary aesthetic and initially advocating collaboration with the Germans during the Second World War, finally came out against the more radical supporters of Nazi Germany.

== See also ==
- Far right leagues: these groups, in which the Croix-de-Feu are normally included, range from the 1890s–1930s, and range ideologically from Republican Nationalists, to Monarchist to Fascist.
  - Camelots du Roi ("Paperboys of the King"), the youth militia arm of Action Française.
  - Ligue antisémitique de France ("Antisemitic League of France")
  - Mouvement Franciste "French Nationalist Movement"
- Parti Populaire Français (PPF, "French Popular Party")
- Rassemblement National Populaire (RNP, "National Popular Rally")
- Rassemblement des gauches républicaines (RGR, "Rally of the Left Wing Republicans") A post-1945 organisation which traces its ideology to the Croix-de-Feu.
- Nationalist Foreign Volunteers
