= Stanislas Devaud =

French politician (1896–1963)

Stanislas Devaud (15 May 1896, Le Péage-de-Roussillon – 28 June 1963) was a French politician.

== Biography ==
Stanislas Séraphin Augustin Devaud is the son of Joseph Georges Devaud, a silk worker, and Marie Joséphine Goubin.

When the World War I broke out, he volunteered in November 1914 with the 22nd Colonial Infantry Regiment (22nd RIC). On September 30, 1915, he was seriously wounded at Massiges by shrapnel to the right knee. He was cited in the army order, decorated with the military medal and the croix de guerre with palm.

After the war, having received a pension for invalidity on July 1, 1917, he resumed his studies in Paris. While working as a supervisor at the Lycée Janson-de-Sailly, he met Augustin Ibazizen, a supervisor like himself, with whom he became friends and whom he would later see again in the Croix-de-Feu and then in the French Social Party (PSF).

He received his Agrégation in philosophy in 1922 and was appointed the following year to the high school in Constantine (Algeria).

A member of the Croix-de-Feu and the French Social Party of Colonel de la Rocque, he narrowly failed in the 1932 legislative elections. In 1936 he was elected deputy of Constantine.

Devaud was born in Le Péage-de-Roussillon. He represented the French Social Party in the Chamber of Deputies from 1936 to 1940. He was married to Marcelle Devaud, also a politician.

On 10 July 1940, Devaud voted in favour of granting the cabinet presided by Marchal Philippe Pétain authority to draw up a new constitution, thereby effectively ending the French Third Republic and establishing Vichy France. In 1941, he was made a member of the National Council of Vichy France.

After World War II, he gave up all involvement in political life. On the other hand, it was his wife, Marcelle Devaud, who began a parliamentary career, as senator of the Seine from 1946 to 1958, then as deputy of the Seine from 1958 to 1962.

He died on 28 June 1963 in Neuilly-sur-Seine.
