= Michel Dobry =

French political scientist

Michel Dobry (French pronunciation: [miʃɛl dɔbʁi]) is a French political scientist. He has taught at the University of Paris 1 Pantheon-Sorbonne since September 2001.

== Biography ==
Michel Dobry was born in 1946.

In addition to his duties at the Sorbonne, he is also a member of the editorial board of the Revue française de science politique. Since the 1980s, he has been developing a sociology of political crises. He is particularly interested in the phenomena fascists and the National Front. In 2003, he published an important collective work on these questions entitled The Myth of French Allergy to Fascism, in which several specialists also contributed, such as Bruno Goyet, Didier Leschi, Gisèle Sapiro, Annie Collovald, Robert O. Paxton, Violaine Roussel, Zeev Sternhell and Brian Jenkins.

== Thought and critical reception ==
Specializing in the analysis of political crises, revolutions and democratic transitions, we owe him the concepts of "fluid political conjuncture" or "collusive transactions" which submits another analysis of legitimacy. Indeed, Michel Dobry proposes a horizontal legitimacy, an alternative to the vertical legitimacy model of Max Weber.

His work Sociology of political crises marks a turning point in the analysis of revolutions by its radically different approach from those usually used in the social sciences and politics.

The myth of the French allergy to fascism published in 2003 under his direction intends to take the opposite view of historians such as René Rémond, Serge Bernstein, Pierre Milza, Michel Winock, Philippe Burrin, who are said to have developed what he calls an "immune thesis" with regard to fascism in France, namely the idea that French society is impervious to fascism, from made the history of the rights in this country. In the review of this book, Jean-Paul Thomas deplores "his ignorance of recent research which has renewed knowledge of the French right".

== Bibliography ==
- Dobry (1986). Sociologie des crises politiques. Paris: Presses de la FNSP. 1986
- Dobry (2000) Democratic and capitalist transitions in Eastern Europe : lessons for the social sciences Dordrecht; Boston : Kluwer Academic Publishers, 2000.
  - review, Slavic review, 60, no. 3, (2001): 607
- (2000). Paths, Choices, Outcomes, and Uncertainty: Elements for a Critique of Transitological Reason in M. Dobry ed. Democratic and Capitalist Transitions in Eastern Europe: Lessons for the Social Sciences. Dordrecht: Kluwer. 2000
- Le mythe de l'allergie française au fascisme Paris : Albin Michel, 2003.
