= Democratic and Radical Union =

French parliamentary group during the French Third Republic

The Democratic and Radical Union (Union démocratique et radicale) was a French parliamentary group in the French Senate during the French Third Republic. Formed in 1924, it brought together members of the Independent Radicals, Democratic Republican Alliance, and other Radical Senators who did not join or left the Radical-Socialist Party.

The group disappeared in 1940 and was not re-created post-war. Most members joined the post-war PRI or the RGR.

== See also ==
- Radical Party (France)
- Independent Radicals
- Sinistrisme
