= European Liberal Party =

Defunct French political party

European Liberal Party Parti libéral européen
- Founded: 1960
- Dissolved: 1977
- Preceded by: Rassemblement des gauches républicaines
- Merged into: Radical Party
- Ideology: Liberalism; Social democracy
- Political position: Centre-right

The European Liberal Party (*Parti libéral européen*) was a French political party founded in 1960 by Jean-Paul David and Pierre Marcilhacy. Emerging from the remnants of the Rassemblement autonome des gauches républicaines, the party positioned itself as a centre-right entity advocating for liberal and social-democratic ideals. It was dissolved in 1977 following its merger with the Radical Party.

== History ==
The European Liberal Party was created in 1960, continuing the ideological legacy of the Rally of Republican Lefts. Pierre Marcilhacy, a prominent figure within the party, ran as its candidate in the 1965 French presidential election. He secured 1.71% of the votes, finishing second to last in the election.

In 1973, the party affiliated itself with the Reformist Movement, a coalition of centrist and liberal political organizations. Four years later, in 1977, it merged with the Radical Party, thereby ceasing its independent operations.
