= Devaud =

Devaud is a French surname. Notable people with the surname include:

- Marcelle Devaud (1908–2008), French politician
- Stanislas Devaud (1896–1963), French politician
