= Republican Social Party of French Reconciliation =

Political party

Social Republican Party of French Reconciliation Parti républicain social de la réconciliation française
- Abbreviation: PRSRF
- Chairperson: André Portier
- General Secretary: Pierre de Léotard
- Founded: July 13, 1945
- Dissolved: November 29, 1959
- Preceded by: French Social Party
- Ideology: Christian Right; Social conservatism Social Catholicism; Anti-communism
- Political position: Right-wing
- National affiliation: Rally of Republican Lefts

The Republican Social Party of French Reconciliation (French: Parti républicain social de la réconciliation française, PRSRF) was a French political party founded in 1945 by former members of François de La Rocque's French Social Party (PSF) who wished to continue the pre-war PSF.

The PRSRF participated in the Rally of Republican Lefts (RGR) before disappearing for good. Its members joined the "moderate" (right-wing) parties of the Fourth Republic such as the CNI.
