= Grisoni =

Grisoni is a surname. Notable people with the surname include:

- André Grisoni (1886–1975), French politician
- Giuseppe Grisoni (1699–1769), Italian painter and sculptor
- Tony Grisoni (born 1952), British screenwriter
