= Charles Vallin =

French politician

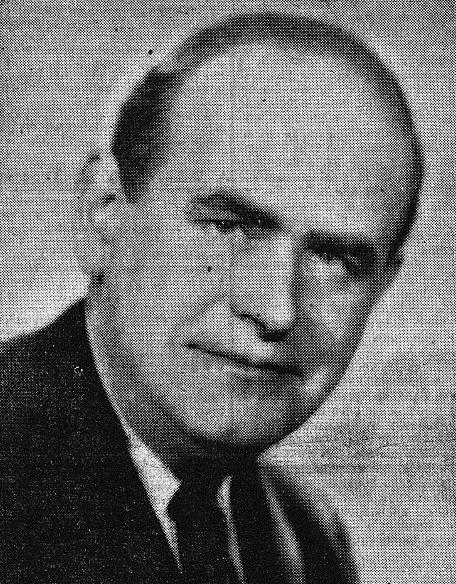
- Vallin in 1938
- Born: Louis Etienne Marie Charles Vallin; 3 July 1903; Saint-Mihiel, Meuse, Lorraine, France
- Died: 13 April 1948 (aged 44); Algiers, French Algeria
- Occupation: Politician
- Relatives: Pierre Teilhard de Chardin (uncle)

Charles Vallin (French pronunciation: [ʃaʁl valɛ̃]; 1903–1948) was a French politician.

== Early life ==
Charles Vallin was born on 3 July 1903 in Saint-Mihiel, Meuse, France.

== Career ==
He joined the Croix-de-Feu and later, the French Social Party, a conservative political party. He served as a member of the Chamber of Deputies from 6 November 1938 to 31 May 1942.

He later joined the French Resistance and became close to General Charles de Gaulle.

== Death ==
He died on 13 April 1948 in Algiers, Algeria.

== Legacy ==
The Place Charles Vallin in the 15th arrondissement of Paris is named in his honour.
