= François de La Rocque =

French soldier and politician

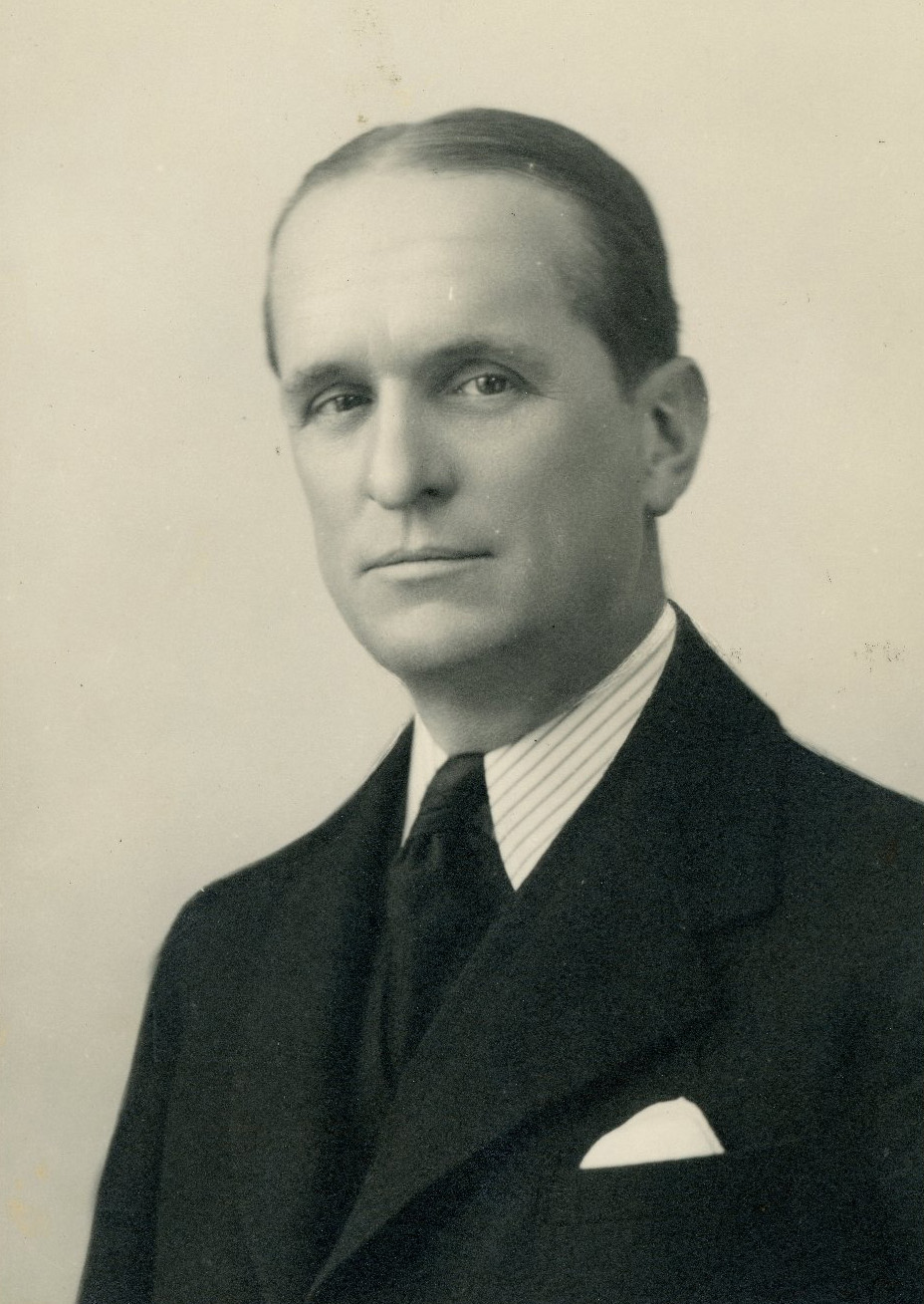
- De La Rocque c. 1930s

President of the French Social Party
- In office 10 January 1936 – 10 July 1940
- Preceded by: Party founded
- Succeeded by: Party dissolved

Leader of the Croix-de-Feu
- In office 1930 – 10 January 1936
- Preceded by: Maurice d'Hartoy
- Succeeded by: Organization dissolved

Member of the National Council of the French State
- In office 23 January 1941 – September 1942
- Head of State: Philippe Pétain

Personal details
- Born: 6 October 1885 Lorient, France
- Died: 28 April 1946 (aged 60) Paris, France
- Party: French Social Party (1936–1940)
- Education: École militaire de Saint-Cyr
- Occupation: Politician; soldier

Military service
- Allegiance: French Third Republic
- Branch/service: French Army
- Years of service: 1907–1927
- Rank: Lieutenant colonel
- Battles/wars: World War I; Rif War

François de La Rocque (French: [fʁɑ̃swa dəlaʁɔk]; 6 October 1885 – 28 April 1946) was a French soldier and politician who was the leader of the French right-wing league the Croix de Feu from 1930 to 1936 before he formed the more moderate nationalist French Social Party (1936–1940), which has been described by several historians, such as René Rémond and Michel Winock, as a precursor of Gaullism.

== Early life ==
La Rocque was born on 6 October 1885 in Lorient, Brittany, the third son of a family from Haute-Auvergne. His parents were General Raymond de La Rocque, commander of the artillery defending the Lorient Naval Base, and Anne Sollier.

He entered Saint Cyr Military Academy in 1905 in a class known as "Promotion la Dernière du Vieux Bahut". He graduated in 1907 and was posted to Algeria and the edge of the Sahara and in 1912 to Lunéville. The next year, he was called to Morocco by General Hubert Lyautey. Despite the outbreak of the First World War in 1914, La Roque remained there until 1916 as officer of native affairs, when he was gravely wounded and repatriated to France. Meanwhile, his older brother Raymond, a major in the army, had been killed in action in 1915. However, La Roque volunteered to fight on the Western Front and was sent to the trenches of the Somme to command a battalion.

After the First World War ended in 1918, he was assigned to the interallied staff of Marshal Ferdinand Foch, but in 1921 he went to Poland with the French Military Mission under General Maxime Weygand. In 1925, he was made chief of the Second Bureau in the Rif War during Marshal Philippe Pétain's campaign against Abd el-Krim in Morocco. La Rocque resigned from the French Army in 1927 with the rank of lieutenant colonel.

== Croix-de-Feu and 6 February 1934 ==
La Rocque came from the patriotic and social Catholic movement created by Félicité Robert de Lamennais in the late 19th century. He then joined the Croix-de-Feu in 1929, two years after it had been formed, and took over it in 1930. He quickly transformed the veterans' league; created a paramilitary organisation (les dispos, short for disponibles – available); and formed a youth organization, the Sons and Daughters of the Croix-de-Feu (fils et filles de Croix-de-Feu). He also accepted anybody who accepted the league's ideology in the Volontaires nationaux group (National Volunteers). The Great Depression made La Rocque add to its nationalist ideology a social program of defense of the national economy against foreign competition, protection of the French workforce, lower taxes, fighting speculation and criticisms of the state's influence on the economy. That was overall a vague program, and La Rocque stopped short of giving it the clearly antirepublican and fascist aspect that some National Volunteers demanded of him.

La Rocque concentrated on organizing military parades and was very proud of having taken over the Interior Ministry by two Croix-de-Feu columns on the eve of the 6 February 1934 riots. The Croix-de-Feu took part in the far-right demonstrations in Paris, with two groups, one on the rue de Bourgogne, the other near the Petit Palais. They were to converge on the Palais Bourbon, the seat of the National Assembly, but La Rocque ordered the disbandment of the demonstration around 8:45 p.m., when the other far-right leagues started rioting on Place de la Concorde in front of the Palais Bourbon. Only lieutenant-colonel de Puymaigre, a member of the Croix-de-Feu and also a Parisian municipal counsellor, attempted to force the police barrage. After the riots, the French far right and sections of the moderate right criticised him for not having attempted to overthrow the Third Republic. The journalist Alexander Werth argued:

"At that time the Croix-de-Feu, the Royalists, the Solidarité and the Jeunesses Patriotes had no more than a few thousand active members between them, and that they would have been incapable of a real armed uprising. What they reckoned on was the support of the Paris public as a whole; and the most that they could reasonably have aimed at was the resignation of the Daladier Government. When this happened, on 7 February, Colonel de la Rocque announced that 'the first objective had been attained.'"

== French Social Party ==
In June 1936 the Croix-de-Feu, along with all other French far-right leagues, was dissolved by the Popular Front government, and La Rocque then formed the French Social Party (Parti social français or PSF; 1936), which lasted until the German invasion of 1940. Until 1940, the PSF took an increasingly-moderate position to become the first French right-wing mass party, with 600,000 to 800,000 members between 1936 and 1940. Its programme was nationalist but not openly fascist. The French historians Pierre Milza and René Rémond consider that the success of the moderate, Christian social and democratic PSF prevented the French middle class from falling into fascism. Milza wrote "Populist and nationalist, the PSF is more anti-parliamentarian than anti-republican". He reserved the term "fascism" for Jacques Doriot's French Popular Party (Parti populaire français, PPF), insisting on the latter party's anticommunism as an important trait of the new form of fascism. However, that characterisation of the PSF has been questioned; for example, Robert Soucy has argued that the differences between the PSF and fascist movements in Italy and Germany were more superficial than their similarities and that La Rocque was "a dyed-in-the-wool fascist".

== Second World War ==
After the Battle of France, La Rocque accepted the terms of the June 1940 Armistice "without restrictions". La Rocque also accepted the "principle of collaboration", upheld by Marshal Philippe Pétain in December 1940. However, at the same time, he was attacked by sectors of the far right, which claimed that he had founded his newspaper with funds from a "Jewish consortium". His attitude remained ambiguous, as he wrote an article in Le Petit Journal of 5 October 1940, concerning "The Jewish Question in Metropolitan France and North Africa" (La question juive en métropole et en Afrique du Nord). H. R. Knickerbocker wrote in 1941 that the Petit Journal with La Rocque as editor "assumed a more courageously anti-German attitude after the armistice than did most other papers published under the control of the Vichy government". On 23 January 1941, La Rocque was made a member of the National Council of Vichy France. La Rocque approved the repeal of the Crémieux decrees, which had given French citizenship to Jews in Algeria, but he did not follow the Vichy regime in its racist radicalization. He also condemned the ultracollaborationist Legion of French Volunteers Against Bolshevism.

La Rocque changed orientation in September 1942 by declaring, "Collaboration was incompatible with Occupation". He entered contact with the Alibi Network (Réseau Alibi), which tied to the British Intelligence service. He then formed the Klan Network (Réseau Klan) Resistance network with some members of the PSF. La Rocque rejected the laws on the STO, which forced young Frenchmen to work in Germany, and he also threatened to expel any member of the PSF who joined Joseph Darnand's Milice or the LVF.

He was arrested in Clermont-Ferrand on 9 March 1943 by the SIPO-SD German police, along with 152 high ranking PSF members around France. He was deported first to Jezeří Castle, now in the Czech Republic; then to Itter Castle, Austria, where he found former President of the Council Édouard Daladier and Generals Maurice Gamelin and Maxime Weygand. Ill, he was interned in March 1945 in a hospital in Innsbruck and was freed by U.S. soldiers on 8 May 1945. He returned to France on 9 May and was placed under administrative internment. Though the official justification was to protect him against violence from the left, he suspected that his arrest was a deliberate effort at suppressing his political activities.

Years of imprisonment had left him seriously ill, but he received no medical attention until his detention was deemed unlawful and he was moved to house arrest in November 1945. He died on 28 April 1946 following an operation to treat an ulcer which had developed in his esophagus.

== Political heritage ==
The Parti Social Français (PSF) of François de La Rocque has been described as the first right-wing mass party in France (1936–1940). He advocated:

- a presidential regime to end the instability of the parliamentary regime.
- an economic system founded upon "organised professions" (corporatism).
- social legislation inspired by Social Christianity.

Several historians consider that he paved the way to two leading parties of the post-war "republican Right", the Christian democratic Popular Republican Movement (MRP) and the Gaullist Union of Democrats for the Republic.

== Honors and awards ==
- Commander of the Order of Legion of Honour
- Croix de guerre 1914-1918
- Colonial Medal
- Morocco commemorative medal (1909)
- Medal for the War Wounded
- Distinguished Service Order
- Commemorative Medal for the Italo-Austrian War 1915–1918

== See also ==
- Interwar France

== Bibliography ==
- François de la Rocque, Pour la conférence du désarmement. La Sécurité française, Impr. De Chaix, 1932.
- François de la Rocque, Service public, Grasset, 1934.
- François de la Rocque, Le Mouvement Croix de feu au secours de l'agriculture française, Mouvement Croix de feu, 1935.
- François de la Rocque, Pourquoi j'ai adhéré au Parti social français, Société d'éditions et d'abonnements, Paris, décembre 1936.
- Mouvement social français de Croix-de-Feu, Pourquoi nous sommes devenus Croix de Feu (manifeste), Siège des groupes, Clermont, 1937.
- François de la Rocque, Union, esprit, famille, discours prononcé par La Rocque au Vél'd'hiv, Paris, 28 janvier 1938, Impr. Commerciale, 1938.
- François de la Rocque, Paix ou guerre (discours prononcé au Conseil national du P.S.F., suivi de l'ordre du jour voté au Conseil; Paris, 22 avril 1939), S.E.D.A., Paris, 1939.
- François de la Rocque, Discours, Parti social français. Ier Congrès national agricole. 17-18 février 1939., SEDA, 1939.
- François de la Rocque, Disciplines d'action, Editions du Petit Journal, Clermont-Ferrand, 1941.
- François de la Rocque, Au service de l'avenir, réflexions en montagne, Société d'édition et d'abonnement, 1949.
- Amis de la Rocque (ALR), Pour mémoire : La Rocque, les Croix de feu et le Parti social français, Association des amis de La Rocque, Paris, 1985.
- Amis de La Rocque (ALR), Bulletin de l'association.

== Studies ==
- Kevin Passmore, From liberalism to fascism : the right in a French province, 1928-1939, Cambridge university press, 1997.
- Jacques Nobécourt, Le Colonel de la Rocque, ou les pièges du nationalisme chrétien, Fayard, Paris, 1996.
- Michel Winock, Le siècle des intellectuels, Seuil, 1999.
