= Le Republicain de Constantine =

Le Républicain de Constantine was an anti-Jewish newspaper published by Émile Morinaud in 19th century French Algeria. Morinaud and his supporters in the Radical Party used anti-Semitic propaganda to curry support against the conservative Opportunist Republicans who held the majority at that time. Their main campaign promise was to make the Jews "bite the dust". Le Républicain de Constantine became their publication against the rival Opportunist newspaper L'Indépendant. The Jewish Algerian lawyer Elie Narboni accused Constantine's antisemitic newspapers of spreading false accusations that Jews had murdered children and baked cakes with their blood ("blood libel").

== 1936 elections ==
After an interlude antisemitic politics once again intensified in the Algerian colony. The Croix de Feu party had gained supporters with an anti-Semitic ideology. The proposal to boycott Jewish businesses was promoted by Le Républicain de Constantine. Other articles accused Henri Lellouche, a Jewish general council member, of forcing the entire Jewish community to vote against Morinaud. French Europeans were admonished, "in the face of this declaration of war, don't bring you money to anyone other than the French!". The paper accused Jews of calling the French insulting names like "dirty Frenchmen", and frequently made comments about the Crémieux Decree to deny the "Frenchness" of Jews. The Crémieux Decree had given Algerian Jews French citizenship, relieving them of the second-class status imposed on "subjects" under the Code de l'Indigénat. With this Jews had gained the right to vote as full French citizen. This paved the way for increased anti-Semitism in local elections as propaganda sought to convey the urgency of the so-called Jewish threat and mobilize voters to "counterbalance the bloc vote of Jewish electors".

One example of content published by the paper:

French of Constantine, you have the NUMBERS, you have the FORCE, and you have the right ... Your decisions are final. Since they [the Jews] had the audacity of declare war, you have proudly accepted the challenge—on all fronts, political, economic, and social!"
