= Robert Soucy =

American historian

Robert Soucy (born June 25, 1933) is an American historian, specializing in French fascist movements between 1924 and 1939, French fascist intellectuals Maurice Barrès and Pierre Drieu La Rochelle, European fascism, twentieth-century European intellectual history, and Marcel Proust's aesthetics of reading.

== Biography ==
Robert J. Soucy was born in Topeka, Kansas. His father was a fruit and vegetables peddler and his mother a former farm girl. Soucy graduated from Washburn University in 1955, was a Fulbright scholar in Dijon, France in 1956–57, received his M.A. from the University of Kansas in 1957 and was an Intelligence Officer in the United States Air Force 1957–1960. He received his PhD from the University of Wisconsin in 1963, was an instructor at Harvard University 1963–1964, an assistant professor at Kent State University 1964–65, and an Assistant and Full Professor at Oberlin College 1966–1998. He has served on the editorial board of the journal French Historical Studies. He is a professor emeritus of History at Oberlin College.

== Participation in the debate over French fascism ==
Soucy has been a controversial figure in the scholarly debate over French fascism, several of his interpretations differing from those of most French historians who have written on the subject. Soucy disagrees with arguments that fascism in France in the late 1930s was primarily a synthesis of nationalism and socialism ("neither right nor left"); French fascist movements of the period were "marginal"; that Colonel François de La Rocque's Croix-de-Feu/Parti Social Français (CF/PSF) was too socially, economically and culturally conservative to be fascist. The importance of the CF/PSF to the debate over French fascism derives from the fact that CF/PSF was the largest political movement on the French Right in 1937 with a party membership greater than those of the French Communist and Socialist Parties combined.

Soucy acknowledges that some French fascist movements (such as Gaston Bergery's Front Commun and Marcel Déat's "neosocialists") were more left than right (if only for short periods). But he maintains that the largest French fascist movements of the interwar period—Georges Valois' Faisceau, Pierre Taittinger's Jeunesses Patriotes, Solidarité française, Jacques Doriot's Parti Populaire Français and La Rocque's CF/PSF—were strong defenders of social conservatism and upper class economic interests. Soucy contends that former leftists who joined those movements soon became ex-leftists, that the actual social-economic goals of these fascisms ran from conservative to reactionary (including Doriot's movement after 1937), that their major financial backers were from the business world (both Doriot and La Rocque received funds from the steel trust), and that—with the exception of Doriot's PPF before 1937—none of those movements had any significant working-class support (while Doriot's shrank after he turned to the right in 1937).

Too many historians, Soucy argues, have taken the "socialist" rhetoric—or Orwellian "double-talk"—of some of these movements at face value, ignoring how it was repeatedly contradicted by their specific positions on social, economic and political issues. For Soucy, these organizations were far more nationalist than socialist, as was also one of their precursors, the Cercle Proudhon, which honored not the early "property is theft" Pierre-Joseph Proudhon but the later much more socially conservative Proudhon.

Although Soucy points out the obvious—not all French conservatives in the 1920s and the 1930s were attracted to fascism (especially members of the Alliance démocratique and the Parti démocratique populaire in the 1930s)—he regards the most successful French fascisms of the era, that is, those with the largest party memberships, as "variants" or "extensions" of social conservatism in crisis, movements that benefited from the right-wing backlash to the elections of the Cartel des Gauches in 1924 and the Popular Front in 1936. He contends that one of these variants was La Rocque's CF/PSF, a movement that had close to a million party members by 1937.

Soucy describes a number of characteristics that the CF/PSF shared with other European fascisms of the era and elaborates a similarly multi-faceted definition of fascism itself. Whereas some historians who consider upper class conservatives who supported fascism as "allies" or "accomplices" of fascism but not fascists themselves, Soucy objects that such "selective essentialism" spares traditional elites, but not those beneath them, from being regarded as fascists.

For Soucy, the differences between nonfascist authoritarian conservatives and fascist authoritarian conservatives were often more a matter of degree (which could increase when threatened by leftists) than of fixed or irreconcilable essences. Compared to non-fascist authoritarian conservatives, fascists had a greater hatred of "decadence", a greater desire to create large numbers of anti-decadent "new men", a greater appeal to the young (paramilitary "virility" was the ideal), and were more fiercely nationalistic. They also indulged in a more virulent demonology than many conservatives by blaming more harshly or "extremely" communists, socialists, freemasons, internationalists and (though not always) Jews for most of the nation's ills. Fascists had a greater taste for repressing "unpatriotic" souls. They were more willing to engage in paramilitary politics and sought to apply military values (discipline, obedience, anti-hedonism) to society at large. Whereas traditional conservatives were wary of even right-wing populism, fascists were eager to mobilize the masses—but for socially reactionary not socially radical ends (Gustave Le Bon was a precursor there). In doing so, fascists echoed an ideal that traditional conservatives also promoted: that material differences between the upper and lower classes were unimportant compared to "spiritual" values and the unity of the nation. French fascists urged their followers to revive the "spirit of the trenches" of the First World War where workers and bourgeois, peasants and aristocrats fought side by side against the nation's enemies, including domestic enemies. Soucy believes that at various times La Rocque's movement displayed all of the above features.

Soucy maintains that in the 1930s, the more non-fascist authoritarian conservatives (and even many previously democratic conservatives) felt threatened by the political left, the more they were susceptibile to fascism. For French conservatives who chose a fascist alternative, no serious assault on the economic interests of traditional elites was required. A recurring theme in fascist writings from Valois, Taittinger and Coty to La Rocque, Marcel Bucard and Doriot—as well as from Mussolini to Hitler—was that class conflict (especially workers' strikes) should be replaced with nationalistic class conciliation (on conservative terms). In a number of cases during the Great Depression, differences between fascist and non-fascist conservatives gave way to "fusion", with ideological interpenetration taking place in both directions as a result of common interest.

According to Soucy, when French fascist intellectuals like Robert Brasillach and Pierre Drieu La Rochelle employed "anti-bourgeois" rhetoric, they referred to "decadent" bourgeois (secular, liberal, democratic, hedonistic, soft-on-Marxism bourgeois), not "virile" bourgeois. After 1936, in response to the rise of the Popular Front, many previous French fascists and others who were counterrevolutionary, Catholic, traditionalist and reactionary crossed over to La Rocque's PSF. This was also true of some democratic conservatives who had previously viewed La Rocque with repugnance but who were now willing to overlook the many anti-democratic statements and paramilitary threats to overthrow the government that he had made before 1936. When the new Popular Front government banned the paramilitary CF in the summer of 1936, La Rocque replaced it with the PSF and claimed that he was now a political democrat (an alleged conversion that was quickly forgotten in 1941 when he became a strong supporter of the Vichy regime). To historians who claim that his democratic pronouncements between 1936 and 1939 prove that he was not fascist (and that those who supported him, including former members of the CF, believed this as well), Soucy notes that La Rocque was not the only European fascist of the era who chose to pursue a democratic path to power when a paramilitary coup was unrealistic. Hitler made the same calculation after the Munich putsch of 1923 and came to power "legally" a decade later.

Soucy emphasizes that the "fluidity" of fascist ideology and tactics defies historians who insist on imposing static taxonomies on "fascism in motion." A major example of such fluidity in Italian fascism occurred when Benito Mussolini, once a leading member of the Italian Socialist Party, turned sharply to the political Right after his national "syndicalist" Fascio suffered a huge defeat in the Italian elections of 1919. Soucy is also critical of definitions of fascism that require fascists—in order to be considered fascists—to behave before they came to power in as "totalitarian" a fashion as they had after they came to power (both Mussolini and Hitler had once been electoral politicians). For Soucy, too many historians have attempted to whitewash the CF/PSF by defining fascism in such an unhistorical way by taking at face value La Rocque's "democratic" rhetoric after the CF (at least its paramilitary formations) was outlawed in 1936.

Soucy disagrees as well with historians who claim that La Rocque was too "moderate" to be a fascist, believed in "republican legality", disapproved of political violence, was a political democrat, and was opposed to anti-Semitism. Soucy's rebuttal includes the following. In 1935, La Rocque condemned moderates ["les modérés"] for falling prey to "compromise and hesitation" and called upon the French people to stand up against the threat of communist revolution and "its sordid ally moderation". In 1941, La Rocque reminded his readers of the "many times" in the past that he had "condemned moderates", adding that "They are dainty persons. They are weak persons" ["Ce sont gens de mignardise. Ce sont gens de mollesse."]. In the winter of 1935–1936, La Rocque concluded that circumstances were not favourable for a paramilitary coup and chose to pursue an electoral path to power—despite telling his troops at the time that "even the idea of soliciting a vote nauseates me"). "Hitlerism", he reminded them "became a preponderant political force [in Germany] only on the day [in 1930] when... it achieved 107 seats in the Reichstag".

Soucy also points out that La Rocque was not opposed to all political violence. In 1933, La Rocque praised CF members who had engaged in "numerous" political assaults on pacifist conferences between 1931 and 1933 (leading one of them himself). In 1934, he commanded his troops in a "disciplined" way during the February 6 riots in Paris that led to the resignation of the democratically elected Daladier government. In October 1936, three months after the creation of the "democratic" PSF, some 15,000 to 20,000 PSF activists violently contested a communist rally in the Parc des Princes (thirty police were injured in the melee). A month later, La Rocque described the violence of his followers at the Parc des Princes as a spontaneous "mass unprising" that had stopped the "rise to power of a Communist plot".

Nor, according to Soucy, was La Rocque always opposed to anti-Semitism. Although La Rocque opposed biological anti-Semitism and defended "French" Jews, especially Jewish war veterans and right-wing Jews (the chief rabbi of Paris, Rabbi Kaplan, supported him for a while), he indulged increasingly in cultural and political anti-Semitism after 1936, especially where Jewish immigrants and the Popular Front Jews were concerned. In 1941, he wrote of "Jewish purulence" abetted by Freemason "conspiracies", and in 1941, he accused Jewish immigrants of having undermined the "morality" and the "health" of the nation and—again along with the Freemasons—of having contributed to the "mortal vices" of France. In 1941 he exhorted Vichy officials to undertake with "a pitiless resolution" the "integral extirpation of contaminated elements" in French society.

Soucy also questions the argument that La Rocque's movement was not fascist because it was a form of "patriotic social Christianity", i.e. too nationalistic and too Catholic to be fascist. According to Soucy, the same description could be applied to the dominant faction in Mussolini's Partito Nazionale Fascista (PNF) after the signing of the concordat between Italian fascism and the Vatican in 1929 (the Lateran Accords. The large influx of Catholics who poured into the PNF after 1929 left its mark on subsequent fascist ideology in Italy, and Pope Pius XI also thanked Mussolini for implementing the "Social Catholicism" of the Church. Not all of the Duce's supporters aesthetic modernists. Historians who assume that fascism and Catholicism (particularly right-wing Catholicism) are as separate as oil and water ignore that during the 1930s there were many fusions of them, including the existence of important Catholic Fascist movements in Spain, Portugal, Poland, Austria, Hungary, Croatia, Bolivia, Argentina, Chile and Brazil. Soucy notes that there were also many Catholics who rejected native fascisms during the interwar period (for example, more Protestants than Catholics voted for Nazism in Germany in the July 1932 elections, 38% to 16%). However, Soucy contends that Catholics like Valois, Taittinger, Coty, Bucard and La Rocque were indeed spokesmen for fascism, for varieties of French fascism whose intellectual origins in France went back to the 1880s, to a fascist "tradition" that La Rocque and others echoed in many ways.

Finally, Soucy takes issue with the assumption that because La Rocque was highly nationalistic and strongly opposed to a German invasion of France in the 1930s, he was not fascist. The American scholar points out that La Rocque was hardly the only European fascist of the era who was highly nationalistic. Most were, including Mussolini and Hitler, and none wanted their countries conquered by other nations, even fascist ones. That did not prevent La Rocque from writing in 1934 that the Duce was a "genius" and that "the admiration that Mussolini merited is incontestable".

According to Soucy, La Rocque called upon France to engage in "continental solidarity" with (but not subjugation to) fascist Italy, both in the 1930s and in 1941. Soucy also pretended that, in 1941, La Rocque also supported "continental collaboration" with Nazi Germany on the condition that France be treated as an equal partner. When he finally concluded in early 1942 that it was not going to happen (and the war had started to turn against the Germans), he formed his own Resistance organization (he was not the only French fascist to join the Resistance) and was arrested by the Gestapo. He spent the rest of the war in various German prisons. For Soucy, that proves only that he was highly nationalistic, not that he was opposed to French fascism.

However, the source used by Soucy did not mention "with Germans", and such addition radically changed the meaning of the original text, which called for a post-war continental collaboration to rebuild Europe as it was considered by La Rocque as soon as 1939, something that might, at best, be interpreted as a call for an Atlantic alliance. Soucy later recognised having added himself the word "with Germans" when quoting his source. Michel Winock also notice that La Rocque strongly rejected any collaboration with Germany as long as Germany would be a victorious power and France an occupied country and was considered being hostile to those policies by prefects of Vichy regime. By the way, La Rocque started to convey military intelligence to the United-Kingdom as soon as the end of 1940.

== Bibliography ==
=== Books ===
- Fascism in France: the Case of Maurice Barrès, Berkeley, Los Angeles, London, University of California Press, 1972.
- Fascist Intellectual: Drieu La Rochelle, Berkeley, Los Angeles, London, University of California Press, 1979.
- French Fascism: the First Wave, 1924-1933, New Haven and London, Yale University Press, 1995.
- (in French) Le Fascisme français, 1924-1933, Paris, Presses universitaires de France, 1992.
- French Fascism: the Second Wave, 1933-1939, New Haven and London, Yale University Press, 1995.
- (in French) Fascismes français? 1933-1939: Mouvements antidémocratiques. Préface d'Antoine Prost, Paris, Éditions Autrement, 2004.

=== Major articles ===
- "Fascism in France: Problematizing the Immunity Thesis", France in the Era of Fascism: Essays on the French Authoritarian Right, Brian Jenkins, editor, London and New York, Berghahn Books, 2005, pp. 65–104.
- "Fascism", The Columbia History of Twentieth-Century French Thought, Lawrence D. Kritzman, editor, Columbia University Press, New York, 2006, pp. 35–39.
- "Fascism", The Encyclopædia Britannica, 2002.
- (in French) "La Rocque et le fascisme français : réponse à Michel Winock", Vingtième Siècle: revue d'histoire, vol. 95 (juillet-septembre, 2007), pp. 219–236.
- "What is meant by ‘revolutionary' fascism?" and "Lack of Response from Roger Griffin", Erwagen Wissin Ethik, University of Paderborn, Germany, vol. 15, issue 3, Heft 3 (2004), pp. 350–353, 416.
- "Proust's Aesthetic of Reading", The French Review, vol. XLI, no. 1 (October 1967), pp. 48–59.
- "Bad Readers in the World of Proust", The French Review, vol. XLIV, no. 4 (March 1971), pp. 677–686.
- "French Fascism as Class Conciliation and Moral Regeneration", Societas—A Review of Social History, vol. I, no. 4 (Autumn 1971), pp. 287–197.
- "French Fascist Intellectuals: An Old New Left?" French Historical Studies, vol. III, no. 3 (Spring 1974), 445–458.
- "Psychosexual Aspects of the Fascism of Drieu La Rochelle", The Journal of Psychohistory, vol. IV, no. 1 (Summer 1976), pp. 71–92.
- "Psychodynamics of French Fascism: the Case of Georges Valois", The Psychohistory Review, vol. XII, no. 2/3 (Winter 1984), pp. 19–23.
- "Drieu La Rochelle and Ascetic Aestheticism", South Central Review, vol. VI, no. 2 (Summer 1989), pp. 48–55.
- "Drieu La Rochelle and Modernist Anti-Modernism in French Fascism", Modern Language Notes, vol. 95 (1980), pp. 922–937.
- "French Press Reactions to Hitler's First Two Years in Power", Contemporary European History, vol. 7, part I (March 1998), pp. 21–38.
- "Functional Hating: French Fascist Demonology between the Wars", Contemporary French Civilization, vol. 23 (Summer 1999), pp. 158–176.
