= Jean-Paul David =

French politician

Personal details
- Born: 14 December 1912 Miélan, Gers, France
- Died: 31 July 2007 (aged 94) Versailles, Yvelines, France

Jean-Paul David (14 December 1912 – 31 July 2007) was a French politician. He was mayor of Mantes-la-Jolie between 1947 and 1977 and deputy for Seine-et-Oise (later Yvelines).

== Youth and early career ==
Son of Ernest-Henri David (municipal councillor in the administration of Paris), he spent his childhood and early adolescence in Meknes, where his father was assigned as an engineering officer. After attending primary school and the Lycée Poeymireau in Meknes, he was sent away to complete his secondary education in Paris. Boarding at the Louis-le-Grand, he rubbed shoulders with Georges Pompidou and Senghor, and was awarded his two baccalauréats. After graduating from the Sorbonne with a history degree, Jean-Paul David began his political career in 1935 as chief of staff to Paul Bénazet (in charge of the Senate Air Committee). Paul Anxionnaz then appointed him Secretary-General for Radical Youth for Seine-et-Oise, in charge of its reorganisation between 1936 and 1939.

When World War II began, he was mobilised as an officer in the 7th Tank Battalion, where he distinguished himself by his courage and conduct. During the Occupation he devoted himself to his transport business, which he had created to further the repatriation of French prisoners of war. He was recognised after the Liberation of Paris for his activities in the "Police Prefecture" network of the Organisation civile et militaire.

== Political career under the Fourth and Fifth Republics ==
Jean-Paul David was elected Radical Socialist Party deputy for Seine-et-Oise in 1946, a position which he retained until 1962. He was on the right wing of the Radical Socialist Party and later became secretary-general of the Rally of Republican Lefts. The Rally of Republican Lefts was badly weakened by defections and in 1960 he joined with Pierre Marcilhacy to create from its remnants the European Liberal Party. This small party was later absorbed into the Reformist Movement in 1973.

In 1950 he acquired fame by founding the anti-communist Paix et Liberté movement, which was highly active until 1955 and earned him a regular spot on French national radio.

Jean-Paul David was elected mayor of Mantes-la-Jolie in 1947 for the RGR, and remained mayor for five terms until defeated in 1977, by the Socialist candidate Paul Picard. From 1967 to 1967 he was also president of the Union of Yvelines Mayors.

Jean-Paul David retired from political life in 1977 and he died on 31 July 2007 at the age of 95.

== Mandats ==
- Deputy (Radical, then Rally of Republican Lefts, then Democratic Entente) de Seine-et-Oise (1946–1962).
- Mayor of Mantes-la-Jolie (1947–1977) then Honorary Mayor.

== Distinctions ==
- Legion of Honour
- Croix de Guerre 1939–1945
- Order of Ouissam Alaouite (Morocco)

== Bibliography ==
- Eric Duhamel, « Jean-Paul David et le mouvement Paix et Liberté, un anticommunisme radical » in. Jean Delmas et Jean Kessler (dir.), Renseignement et propagande pendant la guerre froide, 1947–1953, Brussels, Complexe, 1999, p. 217-225 (in French).
