= Republican Independents =

Right-wing parliamentary group in the French Third Republic

The Independents (French: Indépendants) and later Republican Independents (French: Indépendants républicains, IR) was a right-wing parliamentary group in the Chamber of Deputies during the French Third Republic between 1928 and 1940.

The IR was usually considered the parliamentary group on the furthest-right of the Chamber, to the right of the Republican Federation (though their membership sometimes overlapped). Its members were the most conservative members of the legislature: some were independent monarchists, while others were members of small extreme-right leagues with too few deputies to form their own parliamentary party, such as the Ligue d'Action Francaise or French Social Party.

Notable members included the Marquis de La Ferronnays, Georges Mandel, Jean Ybarnegaray, Jean Le Cour Grandmaison and Xavier Vallat.

Most members left in 1938 to found the French Social Party (PSF).

== See also ==
- Republican Federation
- Sinistrisme
