= Elie Narboni =

Algerian lawyer

Élie Narboni was a French Jewish attorney from Algeria and President of the Consistoire Israélite de Constantine (Jewish Consistory in Constantine). He was an ally of the Constantine mayor Émile Morinaud. Their relationship began in 1908 and continued during the 1920s even as antisemitic political parties made headway in municipal politics.

Morinaud engaged in antisemitic politics throughout his political career and in his memoirs he discussed his opposition to the Crémieux Decree and the "Jewish bloc" of voters it had created but in 1904 when Morinaud needed Jewish votes during the mayoral elections in Constantine, Narboni opened the door to their alliance when he told Jewish voters not to vote as a bloc. After this Narboni had become an ally for Morinaud. When Morinaud and his supporters in the Radical Party used antisemitic propaganda to curry support against the conservative Opportunist Republicans (who held the majority at that time), Le Républicain de Constantine became their publication against the rival Opportunist newspaper L'Indépendant. During the crisis Narboni accused Constantine's antisemitic newspapers of spreading false accusations that Jews had murdered children and baked cakes with their blood.

== Family ==
According to the Encyclopedia Judaica the Narboni family has been established in Algeria since the 14th century. There were many notable members of the family including Andre Narboni.
