= Paul Faure (politician) =

French socialist politician

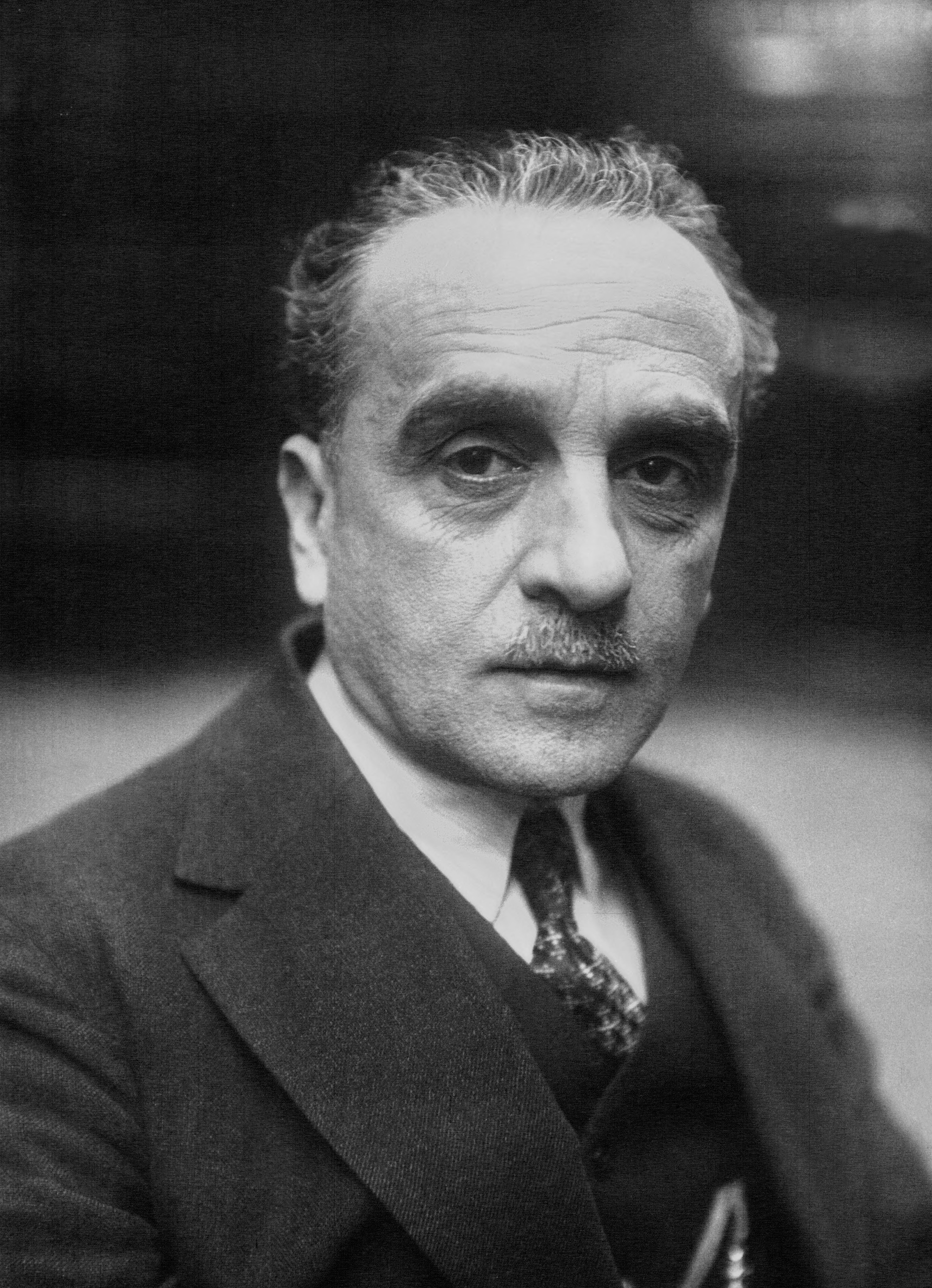
Paul Faure in 1927

Paul Faure (3 February 1878 in Périgueux, Dordogne – 16 November 1960) was a French politician and one of the leaders of the French Section of the Workers' International (SFIO) between the two world wars. He was a minister of state under Camille Chautemps's third Ministry from June 1936 to January 1938 and from March to April 1938, during the period of the Popular Front.

Faure first became a member of Jules Guesde's Parti ouvrier français (POF) in 1901 and was editor-in-chief of the Populaire du Centre. Starting from 1915, he rallied to the centrist and pacifist minority of Jean Longuet in the SFIO, and during the Tours Congress in 1920 he opposed adhesion to the Third International. The Marxist philosopher Antonio Gramsci underscored how, when Faure visited Imola in 1919, after the Bologna Congress, he had seemed to be in perfect agreement with the representatives of Italian "unitarism". Even after the Tours Congress Faure continued using Marxist rhetoric, but he became a moderate and, along with Léon Blum, directed the SFIO. He was elected to the National Assembly from 1928 to 1932 and again from 1938 to 1942 representing Saône-et-Loire.

After Édouard Daladier negotiated the Munich Agreement in 1938 Paul Faure supported the appeasement policy. After the Battle of France in 1940 he rallied to Vichy. In January 1941, he was made a member of the National Council of Vichy France. This led to his being expelled from the SFIO in 1944. He then founded the Democratic Socialist Party (PSD) which participated to the Rassemblement des gauches républicaines. The PSD attracted only deputies accused of collaborationism and dedicated part of its efforts to attempts at rehabilitation of Philippe Pétain's reactionary regime. It had almost no influence in postwar France.

== Sources ==
- Paul Faure, De Munich à la Cinquième République, Éditions de l'Élan.
