= Sinistrisme =

Concept in political science

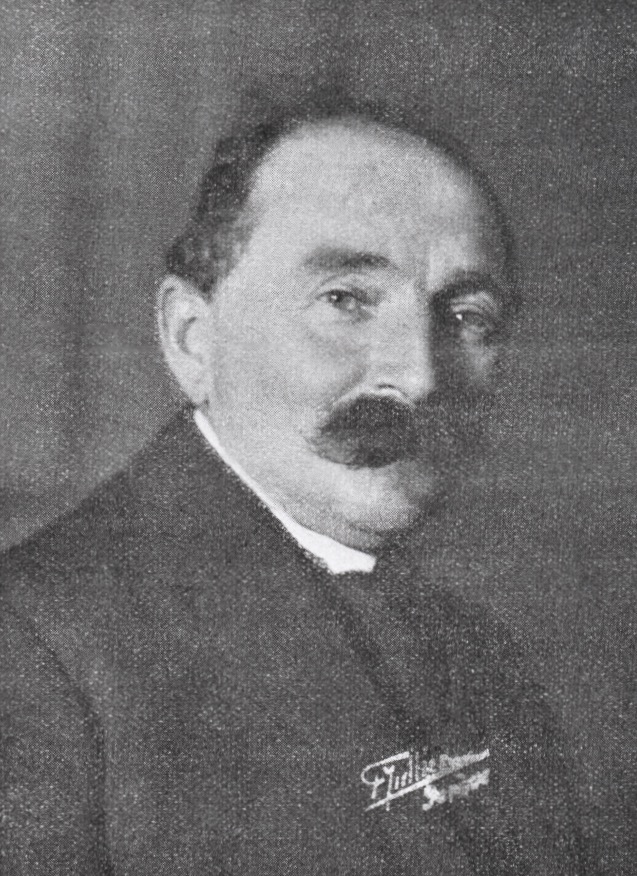
Albert Thibaudet, who developed the idea of sinistrisme.

Sinistrisme (French: [sinistʁism]) is a neologism invented by political scientist Albert Thibaudet in Les idées politiques de la France (1932) to explain the evolution and recombination of party systems, particularly in France, without substantial changes occurring to party ideology.

Thibaudet saw that, over time, issues that previously had not been politicised would emerge, drawing public concern and stimulating demand for political action. A new political movement would form to champion the new concerns, sending repercussions throughout the existing political system. The old party of the left would be split, with some accepting the new issues as legitimate, agreeing to cooperate with the newcomers and adapting their ideology accordingly. Others on the existing left would double down on their existing ideas, refusing change: without changing their ideas, they would end up pushed de facto one space to the right, and end up as the new centre.

Meanwhile, the old party of the centre would be pushed to the centre-right, and so on. As for the very far right, over time the issues of social conservation that motivated them would gradually lose their appeal, and as old issues died off, space would be freed up for the old right to become the new far right.

== In French history ==
The analysis of Thibaudet was the following- the socially-conservative Liberal Monarchists had been the centre-left of the 1820s, but were pushed to become the new centre by the emergence of socially-conservative Moderate Republicans in the 1830s. These were pushed to the centre by the emergence of the Radicals in the 1870s; these were pushed to the centre by the emergence in the 1900s of the Radical-Socialists, who were pushed towards the centre by the growth of the socialist French Section of the Workers' International in the 1920s, who were, in turn, pushed towards the centre by the emergence in the 1950s of the French Communist Party.

This process, seen by Thibaudet as a historical necessity, thus explained, to Thibaudet, the tendency of social conservatives in France (at least in particular), to disavow the label droite (right), long associated in French history with monarchism, in favour of the left. The emergence of new rivals to their left meant that a political bloc suddenly found itself shifted one space to the right, without considering itself to be a party of the right. Thus, political groups in France usually used labels that to an outsider would seem to belong one space to the left:

- Unambiguously, radical deputies who had once belonged to the Radical political family were forced to decide whether or not to join the new Radical-Socialist and Radical Republican Party (PRRRS) when it formed in 1901. Those who did not, such as the historic Radical leader Georges Clemenceau, were thus pushed into the centre-right though they still considered themselves men of the left. As a result, the non-Radical-Socialist Radicals continued to call their parliamentary party the "Radical Left", though they were now a party of the centre-right almost indistinguishable from the Liberals to their immediate right.
- Liberal deputies with socially-conservative views who supported economic laissez-faire, parliamentary sovereignty and constitutionalism, were in 1900 situated on the centre-left. As a result, they labelled their parliamentary group the "Republican Left", even when, twenty years later, they were located firmly on the centre-right of most issues. After the Second World War this terminology persisted: the group that gathered up miscellaneous Radicals and Liberals situated between the Socialists and the Christian-Democrats termed themselves the Rally of Left Republicans.
- Catholics and conservatives who accepted the legality of the Republican regime could be found in two groups by 1900. The first, ideologically conservative but reluctantly accepting the existence of the Third Republic, labelled themselves the "Constitutional" or "Republican Right", whereas those who had a more sincere acceptance of the republican constitution formed, between 1899 and 1901, a party labelled "Liberal Action". Later, a new Catholic party called Popular Democratic Party would be formed, modelled after the centrist popularism of Luigi Sturzo's Italian People's Party.
- Monarchists who were elected to parliament under the Third Republic at first proudly displayed that label. Over time, however, it became politically unacceptable to do so, and they shifted their terminology. Thus by the time Thibaudet was writing in 1931, the monarchists on the far-right of parliament labelled themselves "Conservatives" (a term associated since 1818 with absolute monarchists), "Independents" (a term associated from 1900 with the Action Francaise), or "National Republicans" (a term associated with Bonapartists and the Jeunesses Patriotes)—labels which to an outsider might seem more logical belonging on the centre-right.

This phenomenon was still at play well into the 20th century. Historian René Rémond observed that after 1924 the term "right-wing" vanished from the glossary of mainstream politics in France, such that "at the 1974 presidential election, only one candidate declared himself as belonging to the right: Jean-Marie Le Pen; in 1981, there was none." Conservative (which had been the name of an ultra-royalist review in 1818–1820) was a synonym of "right-wing" often used under the Third Republic, in particular by the Bloc national Chamber. Independents, used in the 1920s for deputies close to the Action française royalist movement, was later used by less reactionary politicians.

== See also ==
- Classical radicalism
- Cordon sanitaire (politics)
- History of France
- Left-right politics
- Political correctness
- Political realignment
- Politics of France
- Portuguese Republican Party, most parties during the Portuguese First Republic claim to be their successor
- Social Democratic Party (Portugal), a right-wing party named for a left-wing ideology that is no longer the dominant faction within the party
- Trasformismo, a political method of making a flexible centrist coalition of government (often referring to the time during the Kingdom of Italy before World War I, when two liberal parties, the Historical Left and Historical Right, dominated the political landscape)
- Venstre, literally meaning left, in the names of three Nordic political parties that are not left-wing:
  - Venstre (Denmark)#Origin of the name, a right-wing party in Denmark
  - Danish Social Liberal Party#Etymology, a centrist party in Denmark
  - Liberal Party (Norway)#Etymology, a centrist party in Norway
- Whig Oligarchy, a period in Great Britain after the Glorious Revolution, when (after the downfall of the old Tory party) de facto only self-declared Whig factions existed

== Bibliography ==
- Albert Thibaudet, Les Idées politiques de la France, 1932 (in French)
- Jean Touchard and Michel Winock, La gauche en France depuis 1900 ("The Left-wing in France Since 1900") Seuil, 1977, ISBN 2-02-004548-6 (in French)
