= Berneville =

- Commune
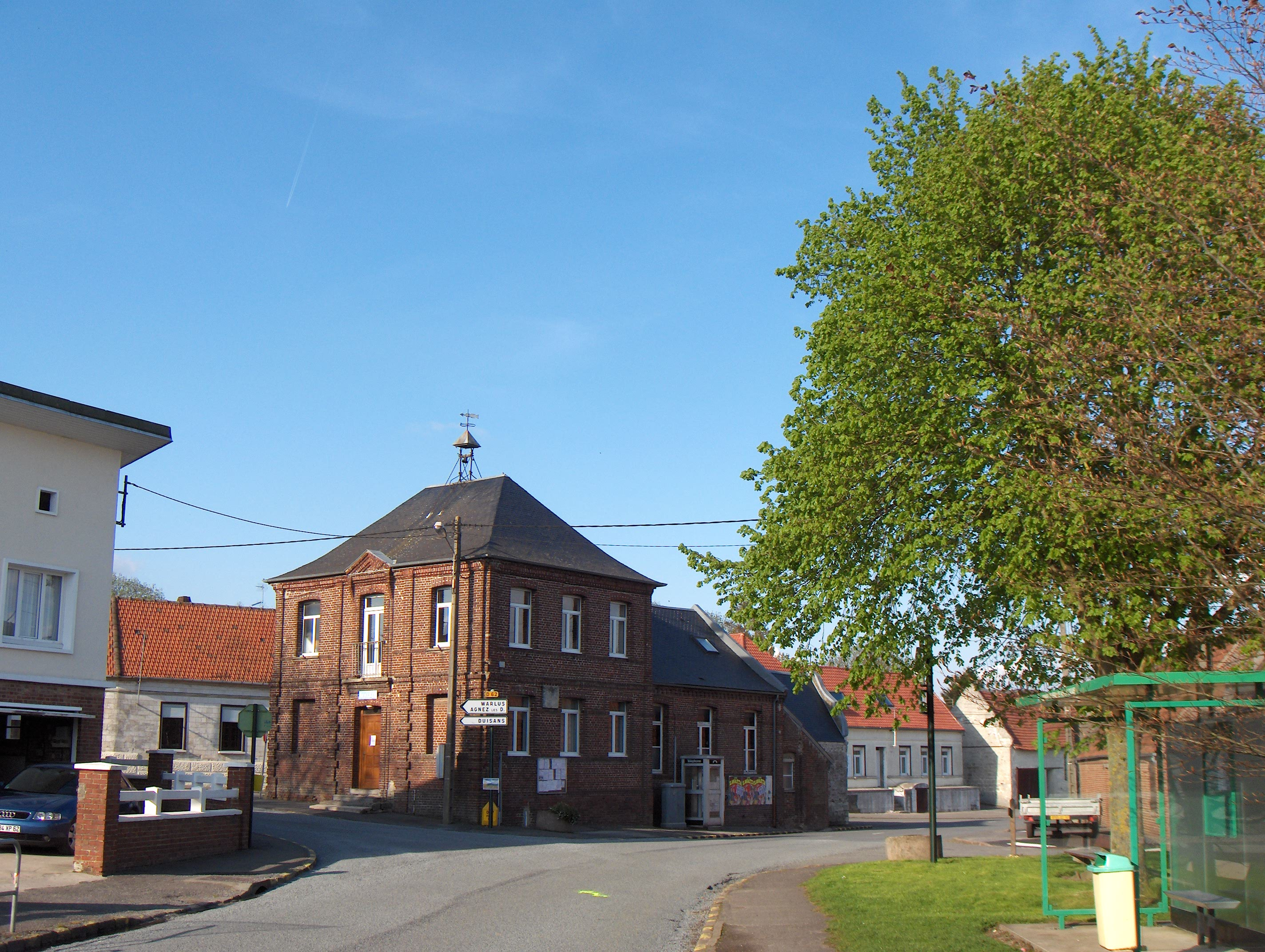
- The town hall of Berneville

- Coat of arms
- Location of Berneville
- Location within France Location within Hauts-de-France
- Coordinates: 50°15′59″N 2°40′20″E
- Country: France
- Region: Hauts-de-France
- Department: Pas-de-Calais
- Arrondissement: Arras
- Canton: Avesnes-le-Comte
- Intercommunality: CC Campagnes de l'Artois

Government
  - Mayor (2020–2026): Julien Bellengier
- Area^{1}: 5.63 km^{2} (2.17 sq mi)
- Elevation: 91 m (299 ft)
- Highest elevation: 122 m (400 ft)
- Lowest elevation: 76 m (249 ft)
- Population (2023): 485
  - Density: 86.1/km^{2} (223/sq mi)
- Time zone: UTC+01:00 (CET)
  - Summer (DST): UTC+02:00 (CEST)
- INSEE/Postal code: 62115 /62123
- ^{1} French Land Register data, which excludes lakes, ponds, glaciers > 1 km^{2} (0.386 sq mi or 247 acres) and river estuaries.

Berneville (French pronunciation: [bɛʁnəvil]; Picard: Bérnevile) is a commune in the Pas-de-Calais department in the Hauts-de-France region of France.

== Geography ==
A farming village located 5 miles (8 km) southwest of Arras at the junction of the D62 and D67 roads. It is geographically located at an elevation of 148 meters.

== Population ==
The inhabitants are called Bernevillois in French.

Historical population
Year	Pop.	±% p.a.
1968	252	—
1975	235	−0.99%
1982	361	+6.32%
1990	493	+3.97%
1999	488	−0.11%
2007	434	−1.46%
2012	482	+2.12%
2017	480	−0.08%
2023	485	+0.17%
Source: INSEE

== Sights ==
- The church of St. Géry, dating from the eighteenth century.

== Personalities ==
- Maurice d'Hartoy (1892–1981), soldier, politician and writer, born and buried at Berneville.

== See also ==
- Communes of the Pas-de-Calais department
