= Democratic Socialist Party (France) =

French political party

Democratic Socialist Party Parti socialiste démocratique
- Abbreviation: PSD
- Founder: Paul Faure
- Founded: August 24, 1945
- Split from: French Section of the Workers' International
- Membership (1952): c. 6,700
- Ideology: Social democracy Anticommunism
- Political position: Center to Center-left
- National affiliation: Rally of Left Republicans

The Democratic Socialist Party (French: Parti socialiste démocratique, PSD) was a French socialist political party during the French Fourth Republic, founded on 24 August 1945 by members expelled from the French Section of the Workers' International (SFIO) following the Liberation of France for wartime collaboration with the German occupiers. These included Émile Berlia, Albert Bedouce and Antoine Ellen-Prévot.

The PSD's most famous leader is its founder, Paul Faure, the general secretary of the SFIO from 1920 to 1940. The PSD rallied the pacifist wing of the SFIO, opposed to intervention in the Spanish Civil War.

On October 16, 1946, the PSD joined the Rally of Left Republicans (RGR). Until 1952, the PSD had around 6,700 members but the PSD disappeared by 1954 when most of its leaders had either died or re-joined the SFIO.

The PSD, while active in numerous French trade unions, was weak electorally due to the ineligibility of certain PSD members for wartime collaboration. However, Julien Satonnet was elected to the Council of the Republic under the RGR etiquette in 1946. A year earlier, Satonnet had won the Chalon-sur-Saône municipal elections, and served as mayor of the city until 1952.
