= L'Histoire =

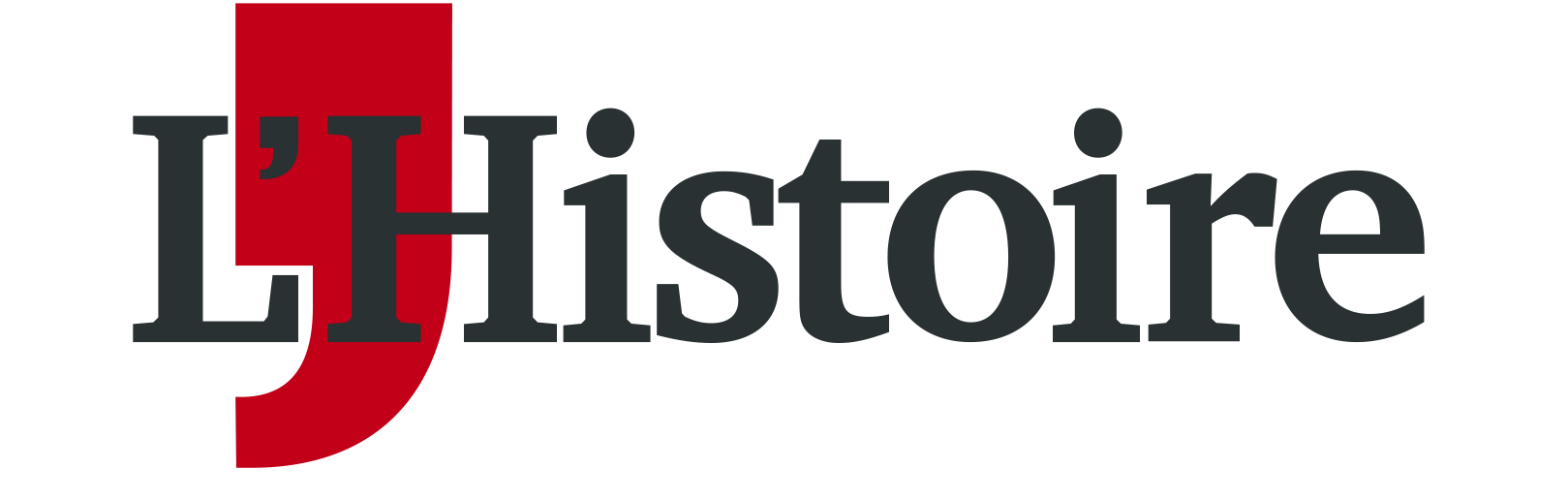
- Editorial director: Valérie Hannin
- Editorial assistant: Marie Alberto Jeanjacques
- Editor-in-chief: Héloïse Kolebka
- Deputy editors-in-chief: Géraldine Soudri
- Deputy editors-in-chief: Olivier Thomas
- Editorial secretary: Raymond Lévêque
- Frequency: Monthly
- Founder: Michel Chodkiewicz; Michel Winock
- First issue: 9 May 1978; 48 years ago
- Country: France
- Based in: Paris
- Language: French
- Website: lhistoire.fr
- ISSN: 0182-2411

L'Histoire is a monthly mainstream French magazine dedicated to historical studies, recognized by peers as the most important historical popular magazine (as opposed to specific university journals or less scientific popular historical magazines).

L'Histoire was founded by Michel Winock. Jean-Noël Jeanneney, president of the National Library of France since 2002, and Jean-Michel Gaillard are part of the editorial board. Many historians who write for L'Histoire also teach at the Paris Institute of Political Studies, better known as Sciences Po.

== Criticism ==
According to historian Gérard Noiriel in 2005, "L'Histoire" has lost its status as a "high-level popular science magazine" and emphasizes that "the scholarly dimension of its initial approach has virtually disappeared." Noting that "one no longer finds in 'L'Histoire' the list of courses at the Collège de France, but rather television listings," he adds: "most issues are directly related to current events, and the normative stance of intellectual journalism has prevailed at the expense of scientific understanding."

The association Acrimed criticized the special issue dated May 2008: "First, the entire field of historical studies revolves around the magazine itself, its collaborators and the initiatives it supports. Then, historical debates are reduced to the positions of the editorial staff or those close to them, with criticism of these positions barely mentioned or dismissed outright. According to this article, "L'Histoire" has a clear preference for historians such as François Furet and Stéphane Courtois, known for their anti-communist or even anti-Marxist positions. The theses of Marxist historians, such as Michel Vovelle or Albert Soboul, are poorly represented there. Acrimed denounces a discrimination resulting in a refusal of debate, for example regarding the presentation of the controversy launched by the publication in 1997 of the Black Book of Communism: the association asserts that the historian supposed to criticize a thesis is judge and party, which would pose a problem from the point of view of scientific research. Finally, Acrimed considers that, like other newspapers in the group to which it belongs, the magazine produces a "liberal discourse".

Furthermore, Acrimed notes that in a special issue published in April 2017, on the eve of the 2017 French presidential election, and entitled "The Great Quarrel: The History of France," "L'Histoire" devotes four pages to an interview with Emmanuel Macron, the only candidate granted access to the magazine to explain how his conception of history is intertwined with his vision of France. The association emphasizes that "Sciences et Avenir," another publication belonging to Claude Perdriel], an outspoken supporter of Macron, also published at the same time a single interview with a candidate.
