= Albert Bedouce =

French politician (1869–1947)

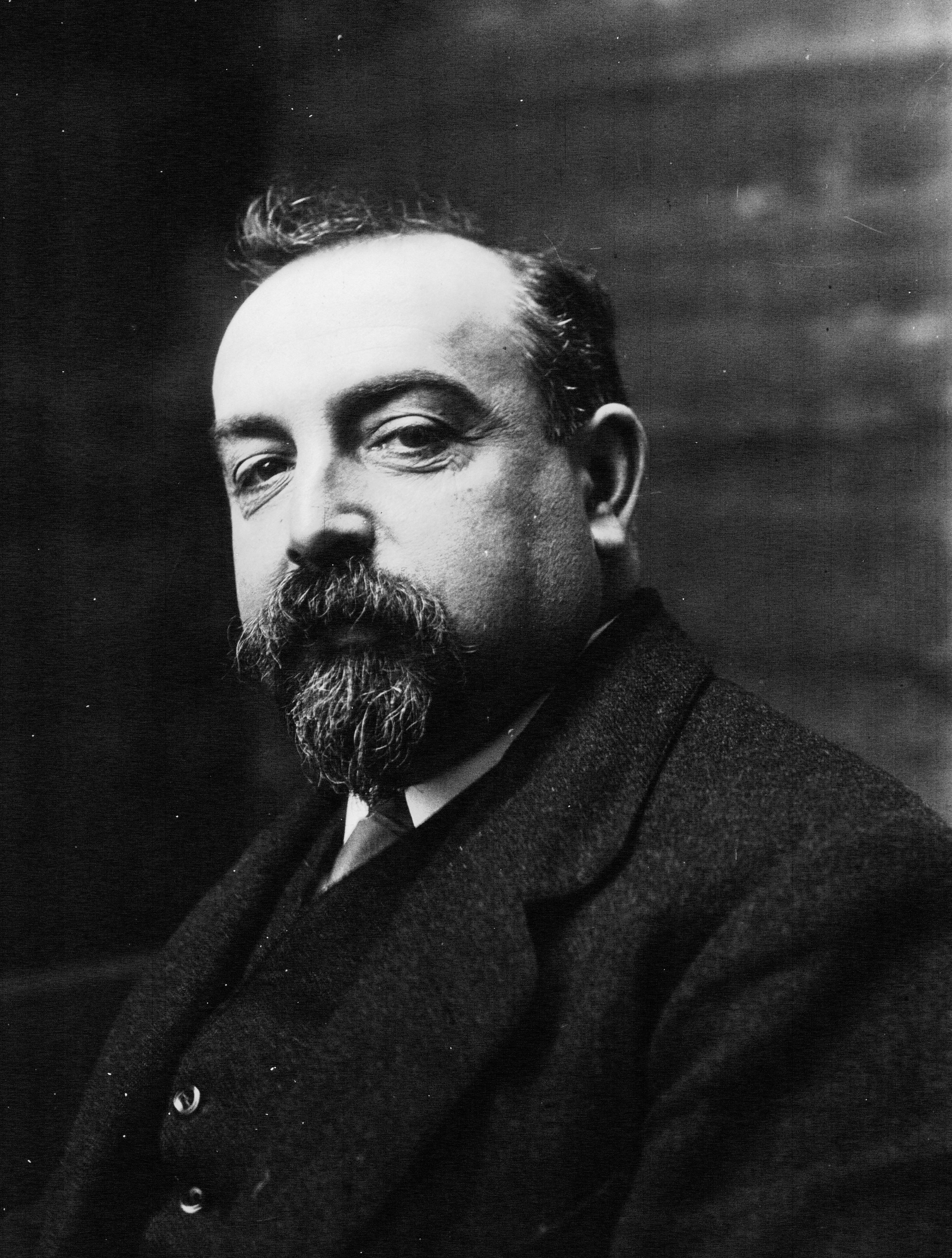
Albert Bedouce in 1914

Albert Bedouce (8 January 1869, Toulouse – 4 August 1947, Paris) was a French politician. He joined at first the French Workers' Party (POF), which in 1902 merged into the Socialist Party of France (PSdF), which in turn merged into the French Section of the Workers' International (SFIO) in 1905. Bedouce was a member of the Chamber of Deputies from 1906 to 1919 and from 1924 to 1940. He was Minister of Public Works from 1936 to 1937. In the 1939 presidential election Bedouce was the candidate of the SFIO, but lost to Albert Lebrun, the candidate of the Democratic Republican Alliance. On 10 July 1940, he voted in favour of granting the Cabinet presided by Marshal Philippe Pétain authority to draw up a new constitution, thereby effectively ending the French Third Republic and establishing Vichy France. For this he was expelled from the SFIO after the Liberation of France. In 1945, with his associate Émile Berlia, he joined the newly founded Democratic Socialist Party (PSD).
