= Émile Berlia =

French politician (1878–1946)

Émile Berlia (23 May 1878 – 13 August 1946) was a French politician.

Berlia was born in Toulouse. As a young man, he joined the French Section of the Workers' International (SFIO). An associate of Albert Bedouce, he was a member of the Chamber of Deputies from 1933 to 1940. In 1945, having been excluded from the SFIO, he joined the newly founded Democratic Socialist Party (PSD).
