= Lucien Besset =

France international rugby union player & politician

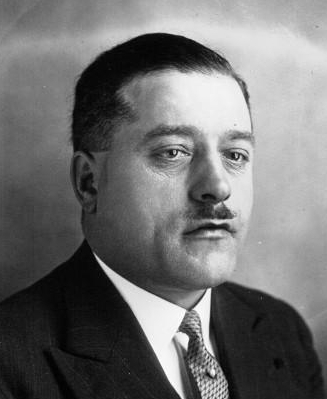
- Born: 4 January 1892 Paris, France
- Died: 22 April 1975 (aged 83) Paris, France
- Height: 5 ft 6 in (168 cm)
- Weight: 146 lb (66 kg)

Rugby union career
- Position: Centre / Fly-half
International career
Years	Team	Apps	(Points)
1914	France	2	(4)

Lucien Besset (4 January 1892 – 22 April 1975) was a French politician and international rugby union player.

== Biography ==
A native of Paris, Besset played rugby union in his youth with Universitaire de France (SCUF), mainly as a fly–half, and was a member of their French Championship–winning team in 1913. He was capped twice for France as a centre during the 1914 Five Nations, against Wales in Swansea and England in Paris, contributing two conversions in the latter.

Besset served two terms in the Chamber of Deputies for Seine from 1928 to 1936, representing the Independent Radicals. He was succeeded by Florimond Bonte. During the 1960s, Besset was president of SCUF.

== See also ==
- List of France national rugby union players
