= Marcelle Devaud =

French politician

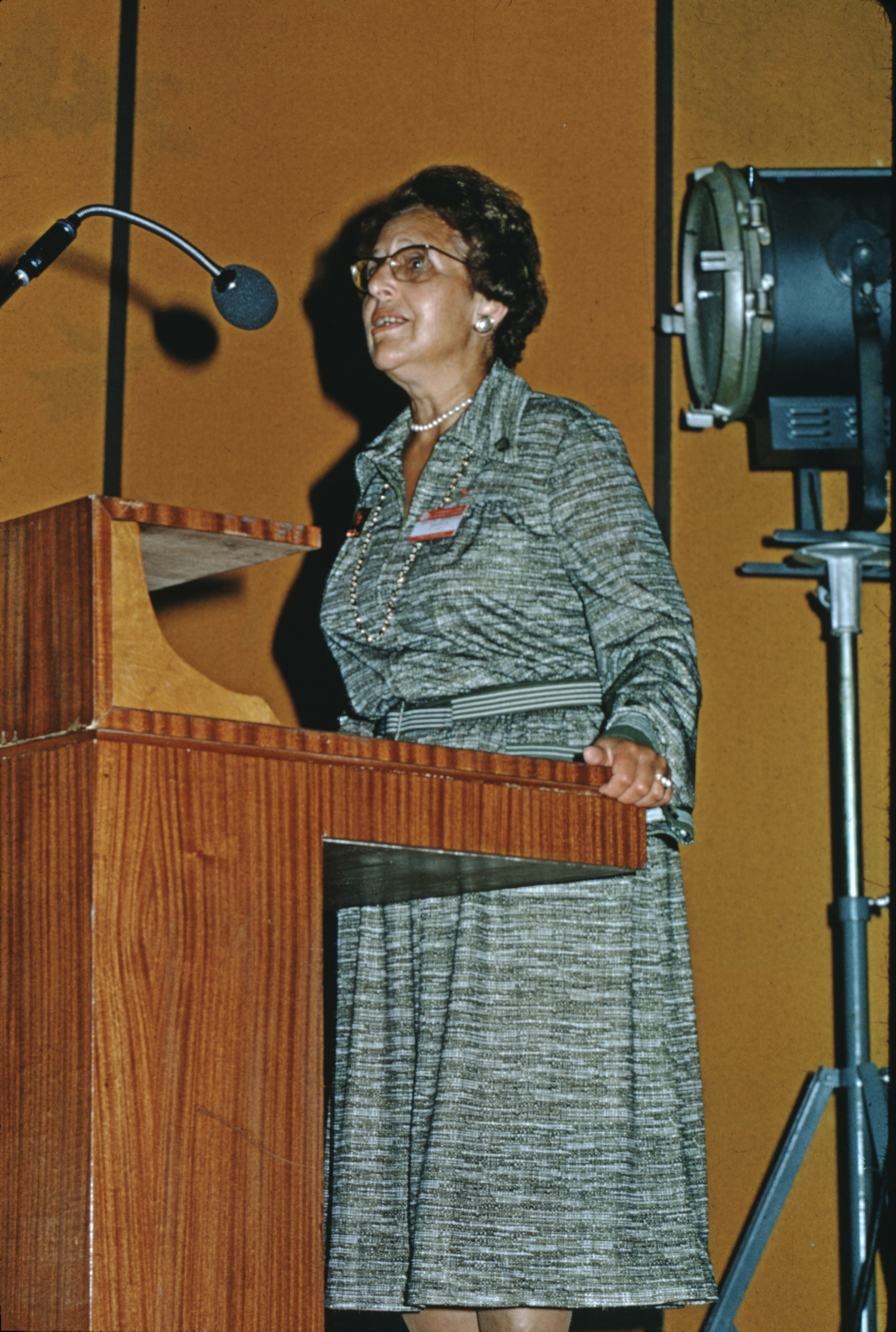
Marcelle Devaud speaking at a conference, Lomé, Togo, July 1975

Marcelle Devaud (7 January 1908 – 4 September 2008) was a French politician. She was a member of the French parliament from 1946 to 1962. She was the first female vice-president of the French senate. She was a Gaullist and advocate for women's rights.

Marcelle Gouguenheim was born in Constantine, a French département of Algeria. She was married to Stanislas Devaud, a French philosopher and politician.
