= Le Péage-de-Roussillon =

- Commune
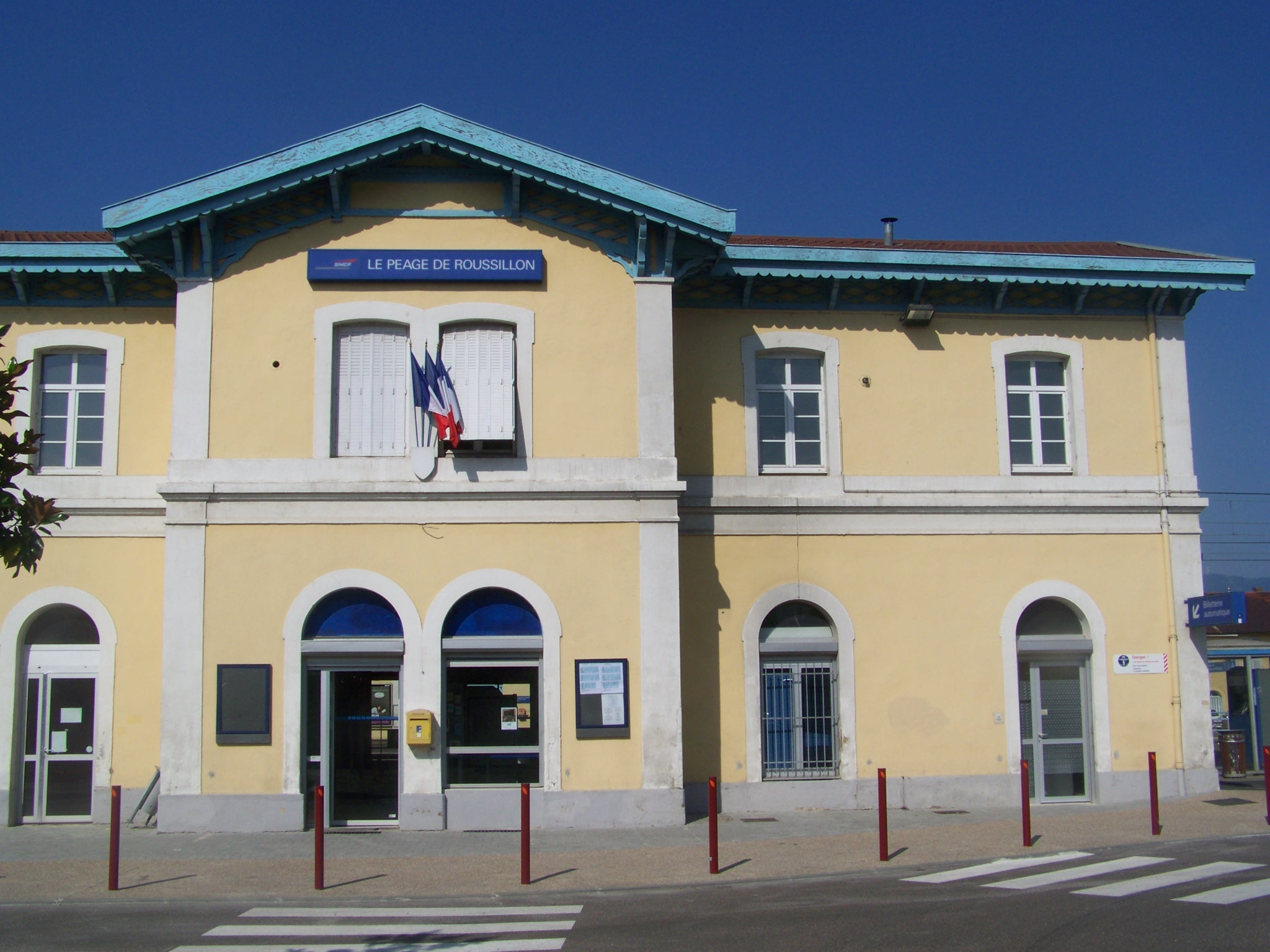
- Train station

- Coat of arms
- Location of Le Péage-de-Roussillon
- Location within France Location within Auvergne-Rhône-Alpes
- Coordinates: 45°22′26″N 4°47′53″E
- Country: France
- Region: Auvergne-Rhône-Alpes
- Department: Isère
- Arrondissement: Vienne
- Canton: Roussillon
- Intercommunality: Entre Bièvre et Rhône

Government
  - Mayor (2020–2026): André Mondange
- Area^{1}: 7.41 km^{2} (2.86 sq mi)
- Elevation: 159 m (522 ft)
- Highest elevation: 263 m (863 ft)
- Lowest elevation: 134 m (440 ft)
- Population (2023): 6,718
  - Density: 907/km^{2} (2,350/sq mi)
- Time zone: UTC+01:00 (CET)
  - Summer (DST): UTC+02:00 (CEST)
- INSEE/Postal code: 38298 /38550
- ^{1} French Land Register data, which excludes lakes, ponds, glaciers > 1 km^{2} (0.386 sq mi or 247 acres) and river estuaries.

Le Péage-de-Roussillon (French pronunciation: [lə pe.aʒ də ʁusijɔ̃], literally The Tollbooth of Roussillon) is a commune in the Isère department in southeastern France.

Le Péage-de-Roussillon has a train station on the line from Lyon to Valence. The town is currently considering a redevelopment of the train station, the aim being to revitalize the town centre and improve the links through the town. The initial work had been undertaken by a team consisting of the commune's planner and Grand Lyon which was also supplemented by JESH Planning based in the northwest of the UK.

== Population ==
Historical population

Year	Pop.	±% p.a.
1793	1,121	—
1800	561	−9.42%
1806	1,174	+13.10%
1821	1,361	+0.99%
1831	1,480	+0.84%
1836	1,534	+0.72%
1841	1,515	−0.25%
1846	1,583	+0.88%
1851	1,597	+0.18%
1856	1,492	−1.35%
1861	1,638	+1.88%
1866	1,487	−1.92%
1872	1,632	+1.56%
1876	1,722	+1.35%
1881	1,775	+0.61%
1886	1,738	−0.42%
1891	1,701	−0.43%
1896	1,622	−0.95%
1901	1,657	+0.43%

Year	Pop.	±% p.a.
1906	1,535	−1.52%
1911	1,493	−0.55%
1921	1,705	+1.34%
1926	2,009	+3.34%
1931	2,847	+7.22%
1936	3,002	+1.07%
1946	3,127	+0.41%
1954	3,840	+2.60%
1962	5,364	+4.27%
1968	5,765	+1.21%
1975	6,243	+1.14%
1982	6,182	−0.14%
1990	5,879	−0.63%
1999	6,351	+0.86%
2007	6,569	+0.42%
2012	6,792	+0.67%
2017	6,680	−0.33%
2023	6,718	+0.09%

Source: EHESS and INSEE (1968-2023)

== See also ==
- Communes of the Isère department
