= Pierre Marcilhacy =

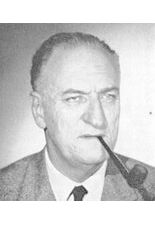

Pierre Marcilhacy (14 February 1910, Paris – 6 July 1987) was a French lawyer and public figure.

== Life and career ==
His family home in Jarnac dated back over six centuries. He fought in the French Resistance during World War II. It was then that he met his wife Gabrielle van Heutz (Kinny), a Dutch woman. They had two children, a daughter, Catherine, and a son, Antoine.

In the 1930, Marcilhacy was a member of the French Social Party (PSF). In the June 1946 French legislative election, he was a candidate for the Republican Party of Liberty (PRL), but was not elected. He was Senator for the Charente from 1948 to 1980, sitting at first in the National Centre of Independents and Peasants (CNIP) group, later as an Independent. He chaired the Senat Commission revising the Code Civil. In 1965 he ran against Charles de Gaulle in the French presidential election as candidate of the European Liberal Party, a small centrist liberal group. He won 1.71% and was thus eliminated. In the runoff election he supported François Mitterrand, who was born in the same town, Jarnac. DeGaulle won the runoff. Marcilhacy is remembered as one of a number of widely diverse candidates – from both the left and the right – who stood against de Gaulle in 1965.

Marcilhavy lost his Senate seat in 1981. In 1983 Mitterrand, who had become President of France, appointed him in 1983 to the Constitutional Council, the French Court that decides all questions of constitutional law.

Under the nom de plume, Pierre Debassac [nota bene], he wrote and published several novels, such as Le lion et la demoiselle and La musique de la tante Aurele.

He died in 1987.

== See also ==
- Charles de Gaulle#Second term
