= Maurice d'Hartoy =

French politician (1892–1981)

Maurice d'Hartoy (1892, Berneville – 1981), whose real name was Mauritius-Lucien Hanot, also known as Lieutenant d’Hartoy, was a soldier, politician and French writer.

Injured during World War I, d’Hartoy was first known for his book entitled Au front, impressions et souvenirs d'un officier blessé (At the front, impressions and memories of a wounded officer) (1916). In 1919, he edited Le Courrier de Paris, a literary journal for veterans. On 26 November 1927, he founded the veterans’ association known as Croix-de-Feu.

In addition to his militant activity, he wrote several novels, books on literary criticism and biographies of other writers. D'Hartoy was also a French representative at the League of Nations and the United Nations.

- This article is based on the equivalent article from the French Wikipedia, consulted on 7 June 2008.
