= William D. Irvine =

Canadian historian and academic

- Born: 1944; British Columbia, Canada
- Died: 14 May 2021 (aged 76–77); Toronto, Ontario, Canada
- Education: Princeton University
- Spouse: Marion Lane
- Scientific career
- Fields: Historian
- Workplaces: York University

William D. Irvine (1944 – 14 May 2021) was a Canadian historian who was Professor Emeritus of History at York University.

Irvine was born in 1944 in British Columbia, Canada. He received his B.A. degree in 1965 from the University of British Columbia and Ph.D. from Princeton University in 1971. Irvine began his teaching career at York University in 1971 at the Glendon campus before moving to the Keele campus where he taught until his retirement in 2011. He was a specialist in French history, particularly French conservatism and the right.

As an author, he has largely been collected by libraries.

Irvine died on May 14, 2021, after a battle with cancer.

== Books ==
- French Conservatism in Crisis: The Republican Federation of France in the 1930s; Louisiana State University Press (1979). ISBN 978-0-80-710-555-9
- The Boulanger Affair Reconsidered: Royalism, Boulangism, and the Origins of the Radical Right in France; Oxford University Press (1989). ISBN 978-0-19-536-388-3
- Between Justice and Politics: The Ligue des Droits de l’Homme, 1898-1945; Stanford University Press (2006). ISBN 978-0-80-476-787-3
