= André Grisoni =

French politician

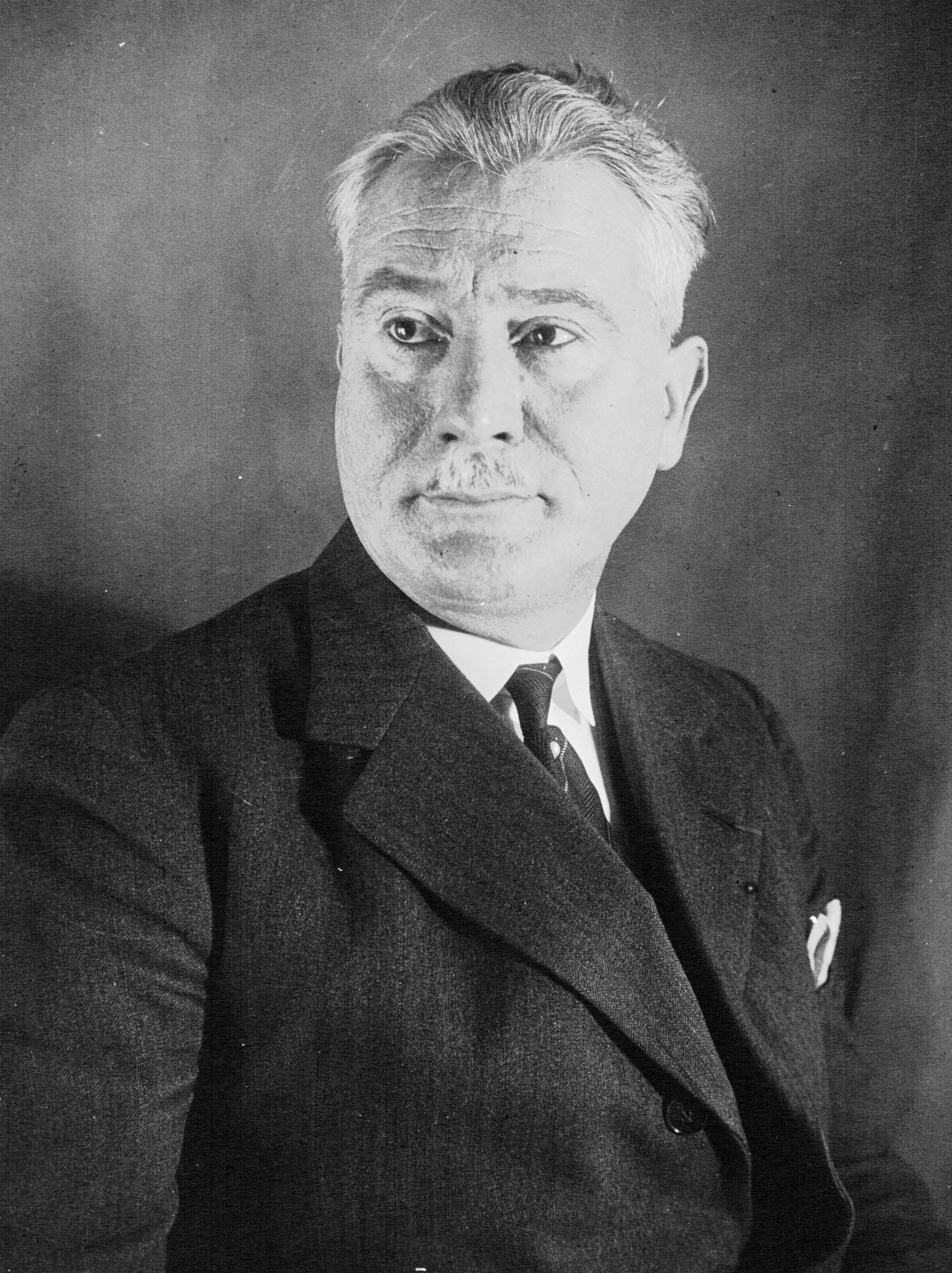
- André Grisoni in 1933
- Born: 20 May 1886; Moltifao, Haute-Corse, France
- Died: 21 August 1975 (aged 89); Courbevoie, Hauts-de-Seine, France
- Occupation: Politician

André Grisoni (1886–1975) was a French politician. He served as a member of the Chamber of Deputies from 1932 to 1936, representing Seine.
