= Rally of Republican Lefts =

French center-right political alliance (1946–1958)

The Rally of Republican Lefts (French: Rassemblement des gauches républicaines, RGR) was an electoral alliance during the French Fourth Republic which contested elections from June 1946 to the 1956 French legislative election. It was composed of the Radical Party, the Independent Radicals, the Democratic and Socialist Union of the Resistance (UDSR) and several conservative groups. Headed by Jean-Paul David, founder of the anti-Communist movement Paix et Liberté (Peace and Freedom), it was in fact a right-of-center conservative coalition, which presented candidates to the June 1946, November 1946, and 1951 legislative elections.

Despite its name, the coalition was on the right wing of French politics; for a long time, the French republican right has refused to call itself "right" since the right-wing in France has historically been associated with monarchism (this practice is known as sinistrisme). It was subsidised by French employers, who saw in it the best defense against Communism and the defender of economic liberalism, in a context marked by various nationalizations supported by the French Communist Party (PCF), the French Section of the Workers' International (SFIO) and the Gaullist movement. Employers conceived the RGR as such until at least the 1951 creation of the National Centre of Independents and Peasants (CNIP) gathering independent conservative deputies. During the 1956 legislative campaign, it became a political party led by Edgar Faure and Radicals who refused to join the Republican Front coalition.

== Composition of the coalition ==
The RGR was largely composed of the Radical-Socialist Party, which had governed France during most of the Third Republic, and of the Democratic and Socialist Union of the Resistance (Union démocratique et socialiste de la Résistance), which included René Pleven and François Mitterrand. The UDSR was a founding member of the Liberal International in 1947. Others parties included:

- Republican Social Party of French Reconciliation (Parti républicain social de la réconciliation française), founded by former members of Colonel de la Rocque's Parti Social Français (PSF)
- Democratic Republican Alliance (Alliance Démocratique), main right-wing party during the interwar period
- Democratic Socialist Party (Parti socialiste démocratique) of Paul Faure, which gathered former SFIO members excluded from that party because of their Collaborationism
- Independent Radicals (Radicaux indépendants), radicals refusing the Radical-Socialist Party alliance with the left-wing during the Cartel des gauches, issued from a scission in 1928; the group is reconstituted at the Liberation by the mayor of Nice, Jacques Médecin
- Republican-Socialist Party (Parti républicain-socialiste) created by independent socialists who had refused the unification of the socialist movement in 1905 under the SFIO, which was, like the Independent Radicals, almost an empty shell by then.

== Foundation ==
After World War II, France was governed by the Three-parties alliance composed of the Communists, the Socialists and the Christian democratic Popular Republican Movement (MRP).

The Radical Party and the pre-war right-wing groups were considered jointly responsible for the 1940 collapse of the Third Republic. In the same time, the attempt to gather the non-Communist Resistance in a new party, the UDSR, failed. In 1946, they formed a coalition to resist to the Three-parties alliance in the legislative elections.

They defined themselves as "left-wing republicans" whilst they opposed left-wing policies. Indeed, until the end of the 19th century, the French left was defined as republican and the right as pro-monarchy. Then, when the republic was no longer questioned, the conservative republican groups, who had sat at the center-left of the assemblies, moved to the right-wing seats, but they continued to consider themselves as left-wingers: this is known as sinistrisme.

When the Communists were ejected from the government during the May 1947 crisis, the RGR joined the government of the Third force with the SFIO, the MRP, then the National Center of Independents and Peasants.

The RGR obtained 11.6% of the votes in 1946, 11,1% in 1951 and 3.9% of 1956 (most of the Radicals had decided to present themselves as members of the Republican Front of Pierre Mendès France.)

In 1955, under the leaderships of Pierre Mendès France and François Mitterrand, the Radical Party and the UDSR advocated left-wing policies and left the RGR. Their internal opponents pursued the RGR, which became a small center-right party led by Prime Minister Edgar Faure and composed of Radicals expelled from the party. It disappeared in 1958, many Radicals joining again the Radical Party while Jean-Paul David created the Parti libéral européen (European Liberal Party), which would eventually fuse in 1978 with the Parti Radical Valoisien.

== See also ==
- Édouard Daladier
- Edgar Faure
- Henri Queuille
- Jean Médecin
- François Mitterrand
- Émile Muselier
- Sinistrisme
- National Centre of Independents and Peasants (CNIP)
