= Independent Radicals =

Political party in France

The Independent Radicals (French: Radicaux indépendants) were a centrist or conservative-liberal political current during the French Third Republic. They were slightly to the right of the more famous Radical-Socialist Party, and shared much of its historical radicalism. The prominent political scientist André Siegfried described them as "Social [that is, economic] conservatives who did not want to break with the Left, and who therefore voted with the Right on [economic] interests, and with the Left on political issues".

== Parliamentary origins and influence ==
Originally in the 1900s French political parties were extraparliamentary organisations focussed entirely on campaigning, separate from the associated parliamentary group. Two 'Radical' parliamentary groups existed, sharing a certain overlap in ideology: the Radical-Socialist group and the Radical Left group. In 1914 the Radical-Socialist Party ordered all candidates elected on its ticket to sit exclusively in the Radical-Socialist group, creating a clearer boundary between the two parties: the Radical Left group was now the parliamentary party of 'Independent' Radicals who quit the Radical-Socialist Party as well as those who refused to join it, normally out of disagreement with the Radical-Socialists' preference for allying with the Socialist Party.

From 1914 to 1940, Radical Republicans in parliament were therefore mostly split into two distinct groups, on the one hand the Radical-Socialist Party and on the other the Independent Radicals some of whom sat unaffiliated but most sitting in the Radical Left group. This largely came down less to ideology and rather their preference in coalition partner: the Socialist Party to their left or the secular conservative-liberals of the centre-right Democratic Alliance. This made the Radical Left a pivotal party, and regardless of whether the government was centre-left or centre-right there was usually one or more Independent Radical in cabinet. Several of France's most powerful political figures were Independent Radicals, including Prime Minister Georges Clemenceau and President Gaston Doumergue.

== Developments during the interwar period ==
At various moments during the interwar the Radical-Socialist Party was subject to small schisms over its attitude to the government of the day. Whenever the more conservative Radical-Socialists quit their caucus, they would either join the Radical Left group directly, or form a small splinter Radical group that eventually merged into the Radical Left. In 1938 an Independent Radical Party was formed from the merger of two groups that had at different points split off from the Radical-Socialist Party in protest at its choice of allies: Henry Franklin-Bouillon's anti-socialist Social and Unionist Radicals (formed in 1927), and André Grisoni's anti-communist 'French Radical Party' (formed in 1936).

The tendency was described by André Siegfried (Tableau des Partis en France) for the case of Franklin-Bouillon's dissidents: "a group largely of former Radical-Socialists who from a sense of National Unity, preferred to side with Poincaré [the liberal centre-right] over the Cartel [Socialist Party], and who ended up turning vaguely into nationalists. Radicalism has always contained this kind of temperament, but has always ended up expelling them. Are they really a party of the Centre[-right]? In any case they have taken refuge there, without fully sharing the mindset, and in any case the pure Radical[-Socialist]s would not forgive their dissidency and welcome them back."

However, the Radical-Socialists did welcome some of them back, and on the margins of the two parties there was much overlap and back-and-forth. The most noteworthy rogue Radical-Socialist to be reinstated was Albert Sarraut, leader of the party's right-wing, who during his expulsion from the party between 1924-5 continued to sit as an independent Radical. Others include the Breton deputy Pierre Michel, who in 1932 initially chose to sit among the Radical Left group before, a year later, moving permanently to sit with the Radical-Socialist group.

Over time the boundaries between the Independent Radicals and the Left Republicans group (caucus of the Democratic Alliance) grew less clear. In 1936 an attempt was made by the liberal former-premier Pierre-Étienne Flandin to merge the two groups under the label Alliance of Left Republicans and Independent Radicals (ARGRI). It ultimately failed: while some Independent Radicals joined, others refused and continued the old caucus under the name "Independent Radical and Democratic Left" group. While today the distinction between conservative Radicals and conservative Liberals appears arcane (these two tendencies had already merged, or would later merge, in most European countries), at the time there was a genuine difference in temperament.

In 1930, the Independent Radical Raoul Péret became Minister of Justice in André Tardieu's cabinet. He was incidentally the cause of his fall because of his personal links with the banker Albert Oustric.

In the Senate, the Independent Radicals sat in the Democratic and Radical Union (Union démocratique et radicale) parliamentary group.

After the Liberation of France, several deputies, including the mayor of Nice, Jean Médecin, formed an Independent Radical Party (PRI), which was a founding member of the Rally of Left Republicans umbrella party.

== Election results ==
| Regime | Year | % | Seats | | |
| Regime | Year | Electorate (first round) | Gained | Out of | % |
|---|---|---|---|---|---|
| Third Republic | 1902 | 16.8% | 116 | 589 | 20.4% |
| Third Republic | 1906 | 7.9% | 134 | 583 | 23.0% |
| Third Republic | 1910 | 11.4% | 113 | 590 | 19.2% |
| Third Republic | 1914 | 16.6% | 66 | 601 | 11.0% |
| Third Republic | 1919 | 6.1% | 93 | 613 | 15.2% |
| Third Republic | 1924 | 11.8% | 42 | 581 | 7.2% |
| Third Republic | 1928 | 10.8% | 53 | 604 | 8.8% |
| Third Republic | 1932 | 9.8% | 47 | 607 | 7.7% |
| Third Republic | 1936 | 8.4% | 39 | 610 | 6.4% |

== Members ==
- Lucien Besset, deputy from 1928 to 1936
- Laurent Bonnevay, Minister of Justice in Aristide Briand's cabinet in 1921–1922, President of the Investigation Commission on the February 6, 1934 events (the crisis that led to the fall of the Second Cartel des gauches), and one of the Vichy 80
- Gratien Candace, deputy of Guadeloupe who sat in the Radical Left parliamentary group from 1928 to 1940, vice-president of the Chamber of Deputies from 1938 to 1940
- Pierre Cathala
- Horace de Carbuccia, founder of Gringoire in 1928, and married to the Paris police prefect police Jean Chiappe's daughter-in-law, deputy of Corsica from 1932 to 1936
- Louis de Chappedelaine, deputy for Brittany 1910–1939; minister January 1931 to May 1932, again briefly in January 1934, January to June 1936, and 1938–1940
- Adolphe Chéron, under-secretary of state of the Minister of Education in Camille Chautemps's cabinet (November 1933–1934)
- Georges Clemenceau, parliamentarian between 1871 and 1920, head of government from 1906–1909 and 1917–1920
- Charles Daniélou, Minister in Camille Chautemps's (1930), Théodore Steeg's (1931–1932) and Édouard Daladier's cabinets (1932–1933)
- Adrien Dariac (short-lived Minister of Agriculture in Alexandre Ribot's cabinet, from 9 to 12 June 1914)
- Maurice Deligne, under-secretary of state of the Minister of the Marine in André Tardieu's cabinet (1929–1930) and Minister of Public Works in Pierre Laval's three successive cabinets (1931–1932)
- Gaston Doumergue, head of government (1913–1914 and February to November 1934) and president of the Republic (1924–1931)
- Henri Falcoz, deputy of Savoie
- André Grisoni, former vice-president of the Radical-Socialist Party and president of the splinter "French Radical Party"
- Gaston Gourdeau, deputy of the Sarthe from 1928 to 1936
- Joseph Lecacheux, deputy of the Manche who sat with the Independent Radicals from 1936 to 1940, and one of the Vichy 80
- André Mallarmé, deputy of French Algeria, sat with the IR from 1928 to 1936, held ministerial offices
- Jacques Masteau
- Jacques Médecin, former mayor of Nice
- Paul Jourdain, senator in the Radical and Democratic Union (UDR) parliamentary group, Minister of War Veterans and of Labour
- Gaston Thomson, Minister of the Navy in Georges Clemenceau's and Maurice Rouvier's cabinets and deputy of Constantine in Algeria from 1877 to 1932
- Constant Verlot, mayor of Sennot and deputy of Saint-Dié from 1910 to his death in 1933

== See also ==
- Radicalism and Liberalism in France
- Radical Party (France), the party to its immediate left.
- Democratic Alliance, the party to its immediate right.
- Sinistrisme, the process of a party of the left being pushed gradually rightwards as a new party of the left appears.
