= Pierre Milza =

French historian

- Born: 16 April 1932; Paris, France
- Died: 28 February 2018 (aged 85); Saint-Malo, France
- Occupations: French Historian *Professor Emeritus at the Paris Institute of Political Studies
- Known for: Author of the biographies of Napoleon III, Garibaldi, and Mussolini

Pierre Milza (French pronunciation: [pjɛʁ milza]; 16 April 1932 – 28 February 2018) was a French historian. His work focused mainly on the history of Italy, the history of Italian immigration to France and the history of fascism, of which he was a recognized specialist.

He was professor emeritus at the Paris Institute of Political Studies (Sciences Po), where he taught contemporary history. He also taught for a year at the Graduate Institute of International and Development Studies in Geneva.

Pierre Milza is notably the author of Voyage en Italie, or "History of Italy", as well as of biographies of Mussolini, Napoleon III and Garibaldi.

== Early life ==
Milza was born in Paris, France to Italian parents. His father, Olivier Milza, was born near Parma in Italy. His status as a child of immigrants motivated his studies in Italian history and Italian-French immigration. Milza first visited Italy at 16, learned Italian and began to study history.

== Distinctions ==
- Knight of the Order of Arts and Letters
- 1994: Grand Officer of the Order of Merit of the Italian Republic
- 2008: Commander of the National Order of Merit
- 2013: Commander of the National Order of the Legion of Honour (named Officer in 2000)

Milza was a member of the François Mitterrand Institute.

== Publications ==
Throughout his career, Milza wrote many books about fascism and the history of Italy. In addition to these publications, Milza devoted time to writing biographies for different figures including Mussolini, Voltaire, Garibaldi and Napoleon III.

=== Independently ===
- De Versailles à Berlin (1919–1945)
- Fascisme français: passé et présent
- Les Fascismes
- Les relations internationales
  - Volume I: De 1945 à 1973
  - Volume II: De 1871 à 1914
- Conversations Hitler-Mussolini
- L’Italie fasciste devant l’opinion française
- Français et Italiens à la fin du xix^{e} siècle (2 volumes)
- Le Nouveau Désordre mondial
- Voyage en Ritalie
- Les Relations internationales de 1918 à 1939
- Sources de la France au xx^{e} siècle
- Mussolini
- Verdi et son temps
- L'Europe en chemise noire
- Napoléon III
- Histoire de l’Italie des origines à nos jours
- Voltaire
- L'Année terrible
  - Volume I: La Guerre franco-prussienne, septembre 1870 - mars 1871
  - Volume II: La Commune
- Les Relations internationales de 1871 à 1914
- Les Derniers Jours de Mussolini
- Garibaldi
- Pie XII

=== With Serge Berstein ===
Milza collaborated with fellow historian Serge Berstein to produce academic works and textbooks.

- Le Fascisme italien, 1919-1945
- Histoire de la France au XXe siècle
- Histoire, les civilisations
- L' Italia contemporaine, du Risorgimento à la chute du fascisme
- L’Allemagne de 1870 à nos jours
- Axes et méthodes de l’histoire politique
- L’Italie fasciste
- Histoire de la France au xx^{e} siècle(5 volume series)
- L’Italie contemporaine. Des nationalistes aux Européens
- L’Allemagne 1870-1991
- Axes et méthodes de l’histoire politique
- Histoire de l’Europe contemporaine
- Dictionnaire historique des fascismes et du nazisme

=== Other collaborations ===
- L'Immigration en France au 20e siècle (with Marianne Amar)
- Le Nogent des Italiens (with Marie-Claude Blanc-Chaléard)
- Le Fascisme au xx^{e} siècle (with Marianne Benteli)
- Le Paris des étrangers depuis 1945 (with Antoine Marès)
