= René Rémond =

French historian, political scientist and political economist (1918–2007)

- Born: 30 September 1918; Lons-le-Saunier, Jura, France
- Died: 14 April 2007 (aged 88); Paris, French Fifth Republic
- Resting place: Père-Lachaise Cemetery
- Known for: Member of the Académie Française

Academic background
- Education: Lycée Carnot; Lycée Louis-le-Grand
- Alma mater: École normale supérieure

Academic work
- Doctoral students: Pascal Ory; Michel Winock

René Rémond (French: [ʁəne ʁemɔ̃]; 30 September 1918 – 14 April 2007) was a French historian, political scientist and political economist.

== Biography ==
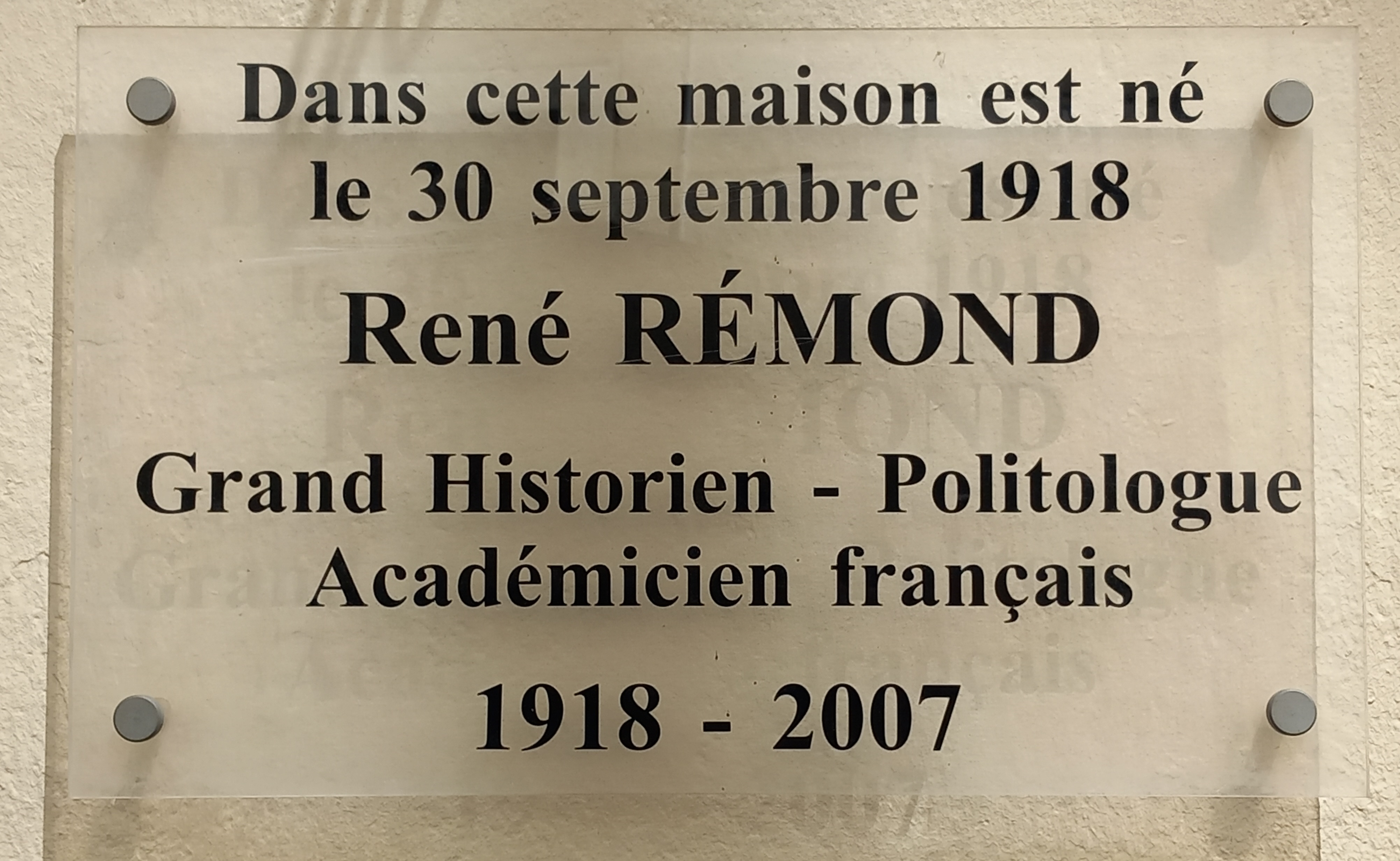
Commemorative plaque on the facade of his birthplace.

His grandfather, Émile Rémond, was a stationmaster and employee of the Paris-Lyon-Méditerranée railway company. . His father, Paul Rémond, born in 1893 in Corgoloin, died in 1973 in Paris, was an industrial draftsman who became an engineer and then a business owner. He was exempted from military service during the First World War due to tuberculosis. In 1917, he married Cécile Godbillion, a music teacher, in Paris.

Born in Lons-le-Saunier, Rémond was the Secretary General of Jeunesses étudiantes Catholiques (JEC France in 1943) and a member of the International YCS Center of Documentation and Information in Paris (presently the International Secretariat of International Young Catholic Students). The author of books on French political, intellectual and religious history, he was elected to the Académie Française in 1998. He was also a founding member of the Pontifical Academy of Social Sciences.

Rémond is the originator of the famous division of French right-wing parties and movement into three different currents, each one of which appeared at a specific phase of French history: Legitimism (counter-revolutionaries), Orléanism, and Bonapartism. Boulangisme, for example, was according to him a type of the Bonapartism, as was the Gaullism. These he considers as being a authoritarian, needing a leader with charisma, and presenting their movements as more "populist" than the others. Legitimism refers to the royalists who refused to accept the legitimacy of the French Republic during the 19th century. (The Action Française royalist movement belongs to the Legitimists, who, being marginalized during the 20th century, managed however to take back some influence during the Vichy régime.) Similarly, he classed the National Front (Le Pen's party) in this group. Orléanists he identifies as economic liberals, which characterizes present-day conservative parties. This group presents itself as bourgeois rather than populist.

Rémond died in April 2007 in Paris at the age of 88.

== Bibliography ==
- Lamennais et la démocratie (1948)
- La Droite en France de 1815 à nos jours (1954)
- Histoire des États-Unis (1959)
- Les Catholiques, le communisme et les crises (1929–1939) (1960)
- Les États-Unis devant l’opinion française (1815–1852), 2 volumes (1962)
- Les Deux Congrès ecclésiastiques de Reims et Bourges (1896–1900) (1964)
- La Vie politique en France, tome 1 : 1789-1848 (1964)
- Forces religieuses et attitudes politiques dans la France depuis 1945 (contributing editor; 1965)
- Atlas historique de la France contemporaine (contributing editor; 1966)
- Léon Blum, chef de gouvernement (contributing editor; 1967)
- La droite en France, De la Première Restauration à la Ve République, 2 volumes (1968)
- La Vie politique en France, tome 2 : 1848-1879 (1969)
- Le Gouvernement de Vichy et la Révolution nationale (contributing editor; 1972)
- Introduction à l’histoire de notre temps, 3 volumes (1974)
- L’Anticléricalisme en France de 1815 à nos jours (1976)
- Vivre notre histoire (Entretien avec Aimé Savard) (1976)
- Édouard Daladier, chef de gouvernement (1977)
- La France et les Français en 1938-1939 (1978)
- La Règle et le consentement. Gouverner une société (1979)
- Les droites en France (1982, published in 2005)
- Quarante ans de cabinets ministériels (contributing editor, 1982)
- Le Retour de de Gaulle (1983)
- Essais d’ego-histoire (in collaboration; 1987)
- Pour une histoire politique (contributing editor; 1988)
- Notre siècle (1918–1988), rééditions mises à jour, 1992 et 1995 (1988)
- Age et politique (in collaboration; 1991)
- Paul Touvier et l’Église (in collaboration; 1992)
- Valeurs et politique (1992)
- Histoire de la France religieuse (co-contributing editor; 1992)
- La politique n’est plus ce qu’elle était (1993)
- Le Catholicisme français et la société politique (1995)
- Le Fichier juif (in collaboration; 1996)
- Les Crises du catholicisme en France dans les années trente (1996)
- Religion et société en Europe aux XIXe et XXe siècles. Essai sur la sécularisation (1998)
- Une laïcité pour tous (1998)
- L'Anticléricalisme en France (1999)
- Les Grandes Inventions du christianisme (1999)
- La politique est-elle intelligible ? (1999)
- Le Christianisme en accusation (2000)
- Discours de réception à l'Académie française (2000)
- Regard sur le siècle (2000)
- Du mur de Berlin aux tours de New York : douze années pour changer de siècle (in collaboration with François Azouvi) (2002)
- La République souveraine (2002)
- Une mémoire française (2002)
- Le Siècle dernier (2003)
- Le nouvel anti-christianisme (2005)
- Les Droites aujourd'hui (2005)
