= Michel Winock =

French historian (born 1937)

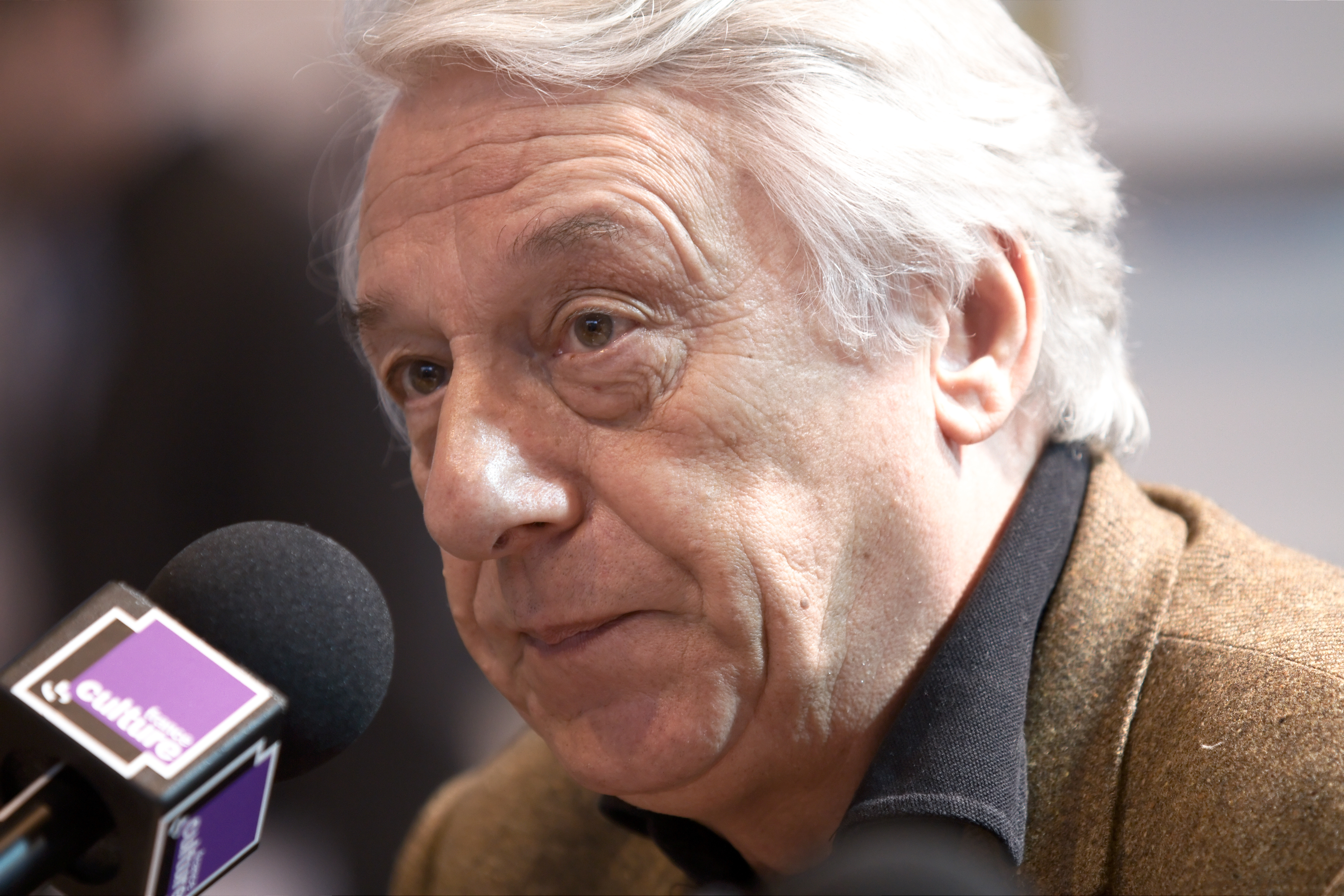
- Winock during a France Culture broadcast at the Paris Expo Porte de Versailles, March 2010
- Born: Michel Joseph Winock; 1937 (age 88–89); 14th arrondissement, Paris, French Third Republic
- Board member of: L'Histoire
- Parents: Gaston Winock (father); Jeanne Dussaule (mother)
- Awards: Grand prix Gobert; Prix Goncourt; Prix Médicis

Academic background
- Education: Sciences Po
- Thesis: Crises et idées de crise en France, 1871-1968 (1987)
- Doctoral advisor: René Rémond

Academic work
- Discipline: History
- Sub-discipline: Political history
- Main interests: Far-right politics in France

Michel Winock (born 1937) is a French historian, specializing in the history of the French Republic, intellectual movements, antisemitism, nationalism and the far right movements of France. He is a professeur des universités in contemporary history at the Institut d'Etudes Politiques de Paris (Sciences-Po) and member of L'Histoire magazine's editing board. Winock has also worked as a reporter for Le Monde.

Winock is the author of Siècle des intellectuels (Century of Intellectuals, 1997), for which he received the Prix Médicis in 1997 in the essay category. He also wrote Voix de la liberté (Voice of Liberty, 2001), acknowledged by the Académie française, and directed the Dictionnaire des intellectuels français with Jacques Juillard. He won the 2010 Prix Goncourt de la Biographie for Madame de Stael.

== Biography ==
Winock became a doctor of letters achieving his agrégation d'histoire in 1961. He started his career in secondary school teaching at the lycée in Montpellier, then at the Lycée Hoche in Versailles and the lycée Lakanal in Sceaux. The creation of the University of Vincennes following the Faure reform of 1968 opened the doors of higher education to him. Winock also led a career as an editor. He was a member of the Esprit magazine from 1964, and became an adviser, then literary director to Éditions du Seuil. In 1978, a year after leaving Esprit, he founded L'Histoire magazine with the aim of making the best historical research accessible to the public. Author of about 40 works, Winock is today one of the most prolific and esteemed French historians.

Winock was one of the initiators of the Liberté pour l'histoire (freedom for history) petition. Winock participated in the administrative council of the association with the same name.

== Bibliography ==
- Madame de Stael, 2010
- La Gauche en France, 2006
- La Mêlée présidentielle, 2007
- Clémenceau, 2007
- 1958. La naissance de la Ve République, coll. "Découvertes Gallimard" (n° 525), 2008
- L'Élection présidentielle en France, 2008
- Le XXe siècle idéologique et politique, 2009
- L'Agonie de la IVème République, 2006
- Pierre Mendès France, 2005
- Histoire de la France politique, 2004 (sous la dir.)
- La France et les juifs, de 1789 à nos jours, 2004.
- La Belle Epoque : la France de 1900 à 1914, 2003
- La France politique : XIXe-XXe siècle, 2003
- Dictionnaire des intellectuels français : les personnes, les lieux, les moments, 2002 (sous la dir.)
- Les voix de la liberté : les écrivains engagés au XIXe siècle, 2001
- Le siècle des intellectuels, 1997
- La droite depuis 1789 : les hommes, les idées, les réseaux, 1995
- Histoire de l'Extrême droite en France, 1993 (sous la dir.)
- Le Socialisme en France et en Europe, 1992
- Les frontières vives, journal de l'année 1991, 1992
- L'échec au roi : 1791-1792, 1991
- Nationalisme, fascisme, antisémitisme en France, 1990
- 1789, l'année sans pareille, 1989
- Chronique des années soixante, 1987
- La fièvre hexagonale : les grandes crises politiques de 1871 à 1968, 1986
- Édouard Drumont et Cie, antisémitisme et fascisme en France, 1982
- La gauche en France depuis 1900, 1981 (with Jean Touchard)
- La république se meurt : 1956-1958, 1978
- Histoire politique de la revue Esprit, 1975
- La IIIe République : 1870-1940, 1970 (with Jean-Pierre Azéma)
- Les Communards, 1964 (with Jean-Pierre Azéma)
