= Blum–Viollette proposal =

1936 French Algerian citizenship proposal

Maurice Viollette

The Blum–Viollette proposal of 1936 takes its name from Léon Blum and Maurice Viollette, who acted as the prime minister of France and governor-general of Algeria, respectively. The proposal was introduced to the Popular Front government of France in 1936, and aimed to address the issue of longstanding French colonialism in Algeria along with the persistent disenfranchisement of the territory's Muslim majority.

The proposal would have enabled a small number of Algerian Muslims to obtain full French citizenship while still allowing them to be subject to Muslim law on some social issues (such as marriage/divorce, custody, inheritance). An earlier policy, the sénatus-consulte legislation of 1865, had enabled Muslims to apply for French citizenship only if they renounced the provisions of Islamic personal status law, something that the vast majority of Muslims refused to do since many regarded doing so as the equivalent of apostasy. The Blum–Viollette proposal of 1936 would have granted these benefits to the highly educated, as well as to those Algerian men who served in the French military, with the plan to widen the benefits to other Muslims at a later date. The proposal did not apply to Algerian Jews, who had gained French citizenship following the Crémieux Decree of 1870.

The proposal never made it to the French Chamber of Deputies for a vote because of the massive protest staged by French settlers and Messali Hadj's Étoile Nord-Africaine in Algeria. It was the failure of this and other such proposals that eventually led to the emergence of violent resistance on the part of the Algerian National Liberation Front and other militant groups whose members aimed to reclaim sovereignty for Algeria by force.
