= Léon Blum =

French politician (1872–1950)

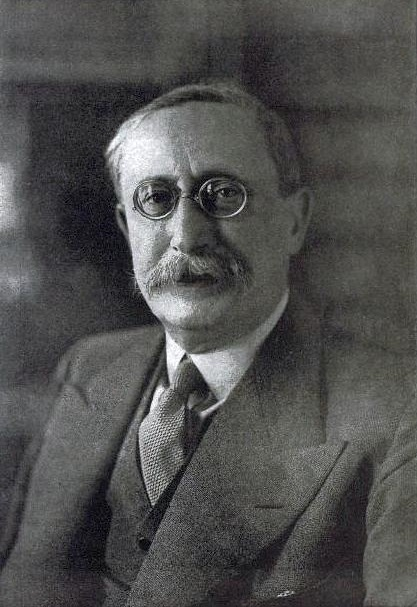
- Blum in 1936

Prime Minister of France
- In office 16 December 1946 – 22 January 1947
- President: Vincent Auriol
- Preceded by: Georges Bidault
- Succeeded by: Paul Ramadier
- In office 13 March 1938 – 10 April 1938
- President: Albert Lebrun
- Deputy: Édouard Daladier
- Preceded by: Camille Chautemps
- Succeeded by: Édouard Daladier
- In office 4 June 1936 – 22 June 1937
- President: Albert Lebrun
- Deputy: Édouard Daladier
- Preceded by: Albert Sarraut
- Succeeded by: Camille Chautemps

Deputy Prime Minister of France
- In office 28 July 1948 – 5 September 1948
- Prime Minister: André Marie
- Preceded by: Vacant
- Succeeded by: André Marie
- In office 29 June 1937 – 18 January 1938
- Prime Minister: Camille Chautemps
- Preceded by: Édouard Daladier
- Succeeded by: Édouard Daladier

Personal details
- Born: André Léon Blum; 9 April 1872 Paris, France
- Died: 30 March 1950 (aged 77) Jouy-en-Josas, France
- Party: French Section of the Workers' International
- Spouses: Lise Bloch (m. 1896; died 1931) Thérèse Pereyra (m. 1932; died 1938) Jeanne Levylier (m. 1943)
- Children: Robert Blum
- Parents: Abraham Auguste Blum; Adèle Marie Alice Picart
- Education: University of Paris
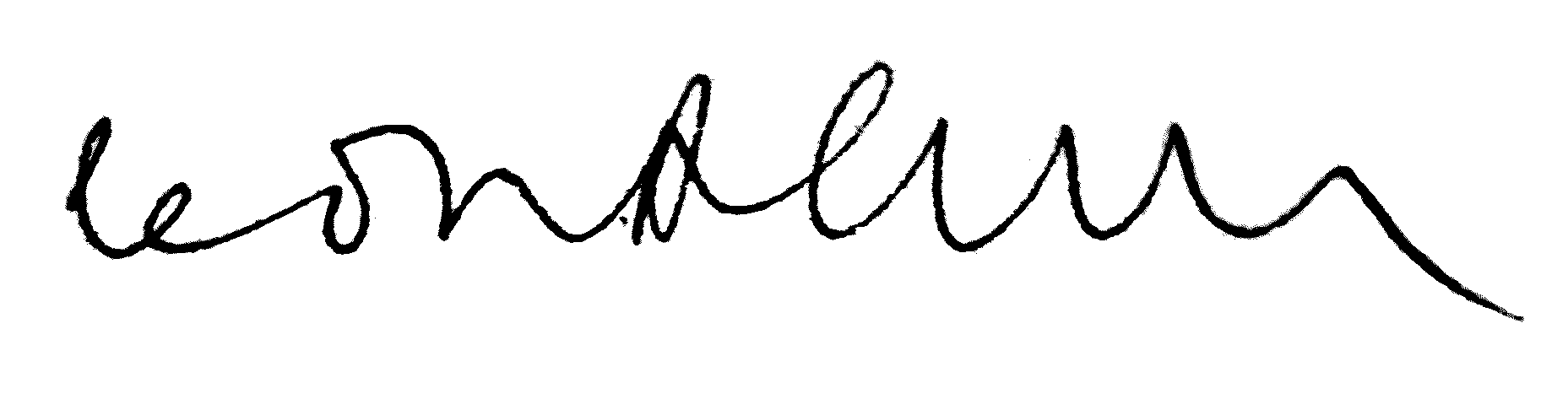
- Signature

André Léon Blum (French: [ɑ̃dʁe leɔ̃ blum]; 9 April 1872 – 30 March 1950) was a French socialist politician and three-time Prime Minister of France. As a Jew, he was heavily influenced by the Dreyfus affair of the late 19th century.

Blum was a disciple of socialist leader Jean Jaurès and became his successor after Jaurès' assassination in 1914. Despite Blum's relatively short tenures, his time in office was very influential. As prime minister in the left-wing Popular Front government in 1936–1937, he provided a series of major economic and social reforms. Blum declared neutrality in the Spanish Civil War (1936–1939) to avoid the civil conflict spilling over into France itself. Once out of office in 1938, he denounced the appeasement of Germany.

When Germany defeated France in 1940, Blum became a staunch opponent of Vichy France and was tried (but never judged) by its government on charges of treason. He was imprisoned in the Buchenwald concentration camp and after the war resumed a transitional leadership role in French politics, helping to bring about the French Fourth Republic, until his death in 1950.

== Early life ==
Blum was born in 1872 in Paris to a moderately prosperous, middle class, assimilated Jewish family in the mercantile business. His father Abraham, a merchant, was born in Alsace and moved to Paris in 1848. Blum's mother, Adèle-Marie-Alice Picart was born in Paris, but her family likewise originated in Alsace. Blum's mother observed Orthodox rituals faithfully, but his father was less religious, being only seen in the synagogue on the high holy days. Blum came from a family that very much identified with the republic, and as a child he attended the public funeral services of defenders of French republican values such as Léon Gambetta in 1882 and Victor Hugo in 1885. He came to identify with the universalism of French republicanism, which portrayed France as an especially enlightened nation that was leading the rest of the world in the right direction, and where French civilization was open to all who were willing to embrace the French language and culture regardless of religion, ethnicity, and race. Blum himself was not especially religious, but was always very proud to be Jewish and frequently affirmed his Jewish identity when subjected to anti-Semitic insults. Blum was more influenced by the rationalistic and anticlerical ideas of the French Enlightenment than by Judaism. Blum always saw himself as both French and Jewish, and he took a special pride in the heritage of the French Revolution, which for him marked the beginning of a civic and secular society in which religion did not matter. He wrote that as a Jew he belonged "to a race which owed to the French Revolution human liberty and equality, something that could never be forgotten".

Blum, c. 1888-1894

Blum first attended the Lycée Charlemagne, but was so successful academically that he was transferred over to the Lycée Henri-IV, the favored school of the elite. Blum entered the École Normale Supérieure in 1890 and excelled there, but he dropped out a year later, entering instead the Faculty of Law. He attended the University of Paris and became both a lawyer and literary critic. Starting in 1892, he became the critic for La Revue Blanche magazine, where he reviewed works by Anatole France, Pierre Louÿs, Jules Renard and André Gide. His reviews made him famous in Parisian intellectual circles, where he became known as a reviewer with interesting and provocative views about the state of modern French literature. He also contributed poetry to the magazines La Conque and Le Banquet. Blum was greatly influenced by Stendhal whose novels he loved, and he was to become one of the world's leading experts on Stendhal whom he often wrote about. As a young man, he affected the style of an aesthete "dandy" and was an associate of the writer Marcel Proust. Proust did not have much respect for Blum as a writer, whom he dismissed as "mediocre". Blum was usually dressed as a dandy in the salons of Paris, wearing an expensive suit, top hat, gloves and a monocle. His way of dressing led to the young Blum often being denounced as a homosexual, with the poet Charles Maurras calling Blum "the maiden" in one of his poems. Throughout his life, Blum was always subjected to accusations that he was gay, but it appears that the effeminate style that he fancied in his youth was more of an act of youthful rebellion.

Blum described himself as "a vulnerable and fragile being, 'like a girl in a novel', an overtly delicate plant". To rebut the charge that he was too "soft" and a homosexual, Blum sought to prove his "strength" by engaging in duels with rivals. In 1896, Blum married Lise Bloch at the Grand Synagogue of Paris. He was initially convinced of the guilt of Captain Alfred Dreyfus who had been convicted of treason for Germany in 1894, but in the late summer of 1897 Lucien Herr convinced Blum that Dreyfus was innocent and as an intellectual with influence he had the duty to take a stand in favor of Dreyfus. Starting in September 1897, Blum became deeply involved in the Dreyfus Affair, where he resolved to "restore the innocent man's good name". Blum was in contact with Georges Clemenceau, who served as the lawyer for the newspaper L'Aurore and Fernand Labori, who served as the lawyer for Émile Zola, writing legal briefs for both Clemenceau and Labori. Blum attended the trial in 1898 of Zola for his letter J'Accuse...! published in L'Aurore. Blum tried to recruit Maurice Barrès, whom he called "my guide" and "my teacher" to French literature to the Dreyfusard cause, and was greatly hurt when Barrès told him he was an anti-Dreyfusard. Blum described himself as "almost in mourning" when Barrès rejected his appeal, and instead wrote the article "The Protest of the Intellectuals" condemning the "Jewish signers" who championed the cause of Dreyfus. The Dreyfus Affair marked the beginning of Blum's interest in socialism, which promoted internationalism and secularism. Blum became convinced that antisemitism was largely the work of the Catholic Church and the upper classes, and socialism in France would end antisemitism forever. Despite all of the passions created by the Dreyfus Affair, in 1899 he wrote he had no fears of "a Saint Bartholomew's Day of the Jews", writing that pogroms were possible "in Poland, Galicia, or Romania or maybe in Algiers, but not in France".

Between 1905 and 1907 he wrote Du Mariage a highly controversial (for the period) and much talked about critical essay about the problems with traditional marriage as envisioned in the late 19th century, with its religious and economic background and strong stress on women remaining virgins until their marriage day. Blum stated that both men and women should enjoy a period of "polygamic" free sex life in order to experience a more mature and stable relationship during later married life: “For both men and women, the life of adventure must precede the life of marriage, the life of instinct must precede the life of reason”

Unsurprisingly he was targeted by the then-powerful Catholic Church in France, in the wake of the turmoil caused by the separation between church and state implemented by Émile Combes in 1905. Far right and royalist politicians and agitators, and most preeminently Charles Maurras, were incensed, and pelted mostly anti-semitic insults and public outrage at Blum, famously dubbing him "le pornographe du Conseil d'état" as Blum was by then a counsellor of this institution. Although Blum's views are nowadays accepted and mostly mainstream in many developed countries, the book remained an object of scandal long after WWI and the shift to the emancipation of women. On 14 October 1912, Blum fought a duel with swords with a rival theater critic Pierre Weber, which ended with Weber surrendering after Blum wounded him.

== Entry into politics ==
While in his youth an avid reader of the works of the nationalist writer Maurice Barrès, Blum had shown little interest in politics until the Dreyfus Affair of 1894, which had a traumatic effect on him as it did on many French Jews. Blum first became personally involved in the Affair when he aided the defense case of Émile Zola in 1898 as a jurist, before which he had not demonstrated interest in public affairs. Campaigning as a Dreyfusard brought him into contact with the socialist leader Jean Jaurès, whom he greatly admired. He began contributing to the socialist daily, L'Humanité, and joined the French Section of the Workers' International (French: Section française de l'Internationale ouvrière, SFIO). Soon he was the party's main theoretician. It is possible that Blum's interest in politics began somewhat earlier, as Fernand Gregh mentioned in his personal memoirs that Blum had expressed interest in politics as early as 1892.

In July 1914, just as the First World War broke out, Jaurès was assassinated, and Blum became more active in the Socialist party leadership. Before the war, Blum had supported the plans of Jaurès for a general strike to prevent a war, but in August 1914 he supported the war under the grounds that France was faced with German aggression. Blum in general favored a pacifistic position, but he also believed that France had the right and duty to defend itself against aggression, which he viewed as the case when Germany presented an ultimatum whose terms were designed to be rejected, followed up by an invasion of neutral Belgium as the best way to invade France. Blum did not feel that he was betraying Jaurès's vision as he believed Jaurès would have rallied to the support of the war after Germany invaded France on 2 August 1914. He supported the Union Sacrée ("Sacred Union") coalition government formed to resist the German aggression. Blum was exempt from military service because he was near-sighted and 42 years old, but he was described as being full of "ardent patriotism" as he sought to do everything within his power to assist with the war effort. In August 1914 Blum became assistant to the Socialist Minister of Public Works Marcel Sembat. In 1915, when a minority of the Socialists started to become opposed to the war, Blum displayed much tact in seeking party unity as he maintained that the German threat necessitated support for the war. He disapproved of the French Socialists who attended the Zimmerwald Conference in September 1915 to seek an end to the war. The majority of the Socialists who attended the Zimmerwald conference were Russian, and Blum was struck by the extent of alienation that the Russian socialists expressed towards their country as Russian nationalism had utterly no appeal to them in the same way that French nationalism appealed to him. Blum was a lifelong Anglophile who greatly appreciated Britain's role in helping to defend France and admired the British Westminster system. Blum felt that the system of government under the Troisième République where the premier was more of a chairman of a cumbersome committee than an executive leader was inefficient, and he advocated France adopting a republican version of the Westminster system with a strong executive prime minister.

In April 1917, he welcomed the entry of the United States into world war I, which he portrayed as a struggle between the militaristic monarchy of Germany vs. the democratic French republic. On 8 April 1917, Blum wrote in an editorial in L'Humanité that: "Our victory will be the emancipation and reconciliation of men through Liberty and Justice". In the same editorial, he praised the call of U.S. president Woodrow Wilson for "peace without victory", writing that the problem was not the German people, but rather Germany's leaders such as Emperor Wilhelm II. By 1917, the Socialists had divided into an antiwar group led by Paul Faure and Jean Longuet vs. a "national defense" group led by Albert Thomas and Pierre Renaudel. Thomas and Renaudel represented a moderate, reformist, and definitely French strain of socialism while Faure and Longuet represented a more militant, pacifistic and internationalist strain of socialism that became increasing opposed to the war as it dragged on. Blum became the leader of a "centrist" group in the Socialist Party that supported the war like the "national defense" group, but in many ways were ideologically closer to the antiwar group. Blum was strongly opposed to Vladimir Lenin who called for the defeat of Russia as the best way to bring about a Communist revolution, and in November 1917 he condemned the Bolshevik coup in Petrograd. The evolution of the more left-wing French Socialists from supporting the war in 1914 to opposing it by 1918 was also reflected in Russia. In 1914, most Russian socialists had either declared their support for war or least their neutrality as many socialists could not bring themselves to supporting Emperor Nicholas II; by 1917 the radical views of Lenin who called for Russia's defeat were in the mainstream of Russian socialism. The anti-war group in the French Socialist Party followed a similar trajectory to what happened in Russia. Blum wrote he was disgusted by the "intransigent fanaticism" of the Bolsheviks along with their cruelty and their "mystical belief in the sole immediate virtue of revolution in itself, no matter what the conditions, the circumstances, the means employed". However, he charged that Thomas and Renaudel had become too moderate and had diluted their socialism. In November 1917, Blum supported the Balfour Declaration promising a "Jewish national home" in Palestine if the Allies won the war. However, Blum saw Zionism as a solution to the problems of the Jewish communities in Eastern Europe, not of France. Blum always saw himself as a Frenchman and wrote about he had no intention of ever going to Palestine as he was "a French Jew, of a long line of French ancestors, speaking only the language of his country, nurtured predominantly on its culture".

On 21 March 1918, Germany launched Operation Michael, an offensive intended to win the war. As the German Army advanced within 50 miles of Paris in the spring of 1918, Blum called for a "Jacobin" defense of Paris with every citizen to be handed a gun. In a bitterly divided Socialist Party, Blum's "centrist" faction had an oversized importance despite being outnumbered by the two other factions, which along with Blum's reputation as a protégé of Jaurès made him into one of the leaders of the Socialist Party by the end of the war. In 1914, almost all Socialists had supported the union sacrée as Blum had done, but as the war continued, many Socialists felt the burden of the war had not been shared equally with the working class making all the sacrifices while the bourgeoise made no such sacrifices. Renaudel and Thomas had discredited themselves by serving as ministers in the union sacrée government who had fought against strikes to maximize war production with many Socialists such as Longuet and Faure charging Renaudel and Thomas had failed to achieve concessions to the workers in exchange for no strikes. By 1918, the more left-wing antiwar group in the Socialist Party was in the ascendency and many of the younger members of the party expressed much admiration for Lenin and the Bolsheviks, who had done what the Socialists only merely talked about. By July 1918, the antiwar group had come close to taking control of the Socialist Party executive. In an attempt to hold the Socialist Party together, Blum tried to paper over the chasm between the pro-war socialists vs. the anti-war socialists by writing on 19 August 1918 in L'Humanité that the Socialists were "republicans and socialists, socialists and French patriots, French patriots and champions of working-class internationalism". Blum wrote that the choice "between Wilson and Lenin, between democracy and Bolshevik fanaticism" was a false one as "I chose neither Wilson nor Lenin. I chose Jaurès".

Only the victory of the Allies with Germany surrendering on 11 November 1918 prevented the Socialist Party from breaking up with Blum attempting to reconcile the two factions after the war. Blum worked hard at rebuilding Socialist Party unity, but the wounds left by the split between the antiwar and prowar Socialists was too deep and visceral, and set the stage for most of the antiwar Socialists breaking off to found the French Communist Party in 1920. In the two years that followed 1918, Blum's reputation as the leader of a "centrist" group who might be able to hold the Socialists together raised his profile immensely. In an editorial in L'Humanité on 19 July 1919, Blum attacked the Treaty of Versailles, which he called "a denial, a betrayal" of the Allied principles held during the war. Blum opposed French intervention in the Russian Civil War, but was cautious about calls from the more radical Socialists to affiliate with the Comintern that had been founded in Moscow in 1919.

In 1919 he was chosen as chair of the party's executive committee, and was also elected to the National Assembly as a representative of Paris. In the election of November 1919, the center-right coalition bloc national won the majority of the seats in the Chamber of Deputies while the Socialists went from holding 103 seats down to 68. Many of the wartime Socialist leaders such as Renaudel, Faure, and Longuet lost their seats while Blum was elected, giving him a greater prominence. Blum's maiden speech on 30 December 1919 gave him a reputation as one of the finest speakers in the National Assembly. In the fall of 1920, Grigory Zinoviev, the chief of the Comintern, in an open letter to "all French Socialists and proletarians" denounced in the most violent terms the leaders of the French Socialists for supporting World War One and demanded "21 conditions" for affiliation with the Comintern. Zinoviev demanded that the French Socialists reorganize along Leninist lines, merge the trade unions into the Socialist Party instead of being merely allied to them, expel all reformist Socialists and accept the guidance of the Comintern in all matters. At the time, the Bolsheviks had tremendous prestige in left-wing circles as the first Communist government in the world and most of the more radical Socialists supported accepting Zinoviev's "21 conditions". Believing that there was no such thing as a "good dictatorship", Blum opposed participation in the Comintern and fought hard against accepting Zinoviev's terms, writing that the Bolsheviks were too extreme in their beliefs and methods. Therefore, in 1920, he worked to prevent a split between supporters and opponents of the Russian Revolution at the Congress of Tours, but the radicals seceded, taking L'Humanité with them, and formed the French Section of the Communist International (SFIC). Throughout the 1920s, Blum saw the French Communists as his main rivals, and hence often took a rhetorical stance that made him sound more extreme left-wing than what he really was in an attempt to keep Socialist voters from defecting over to the Communists.

== Socialist leader ==
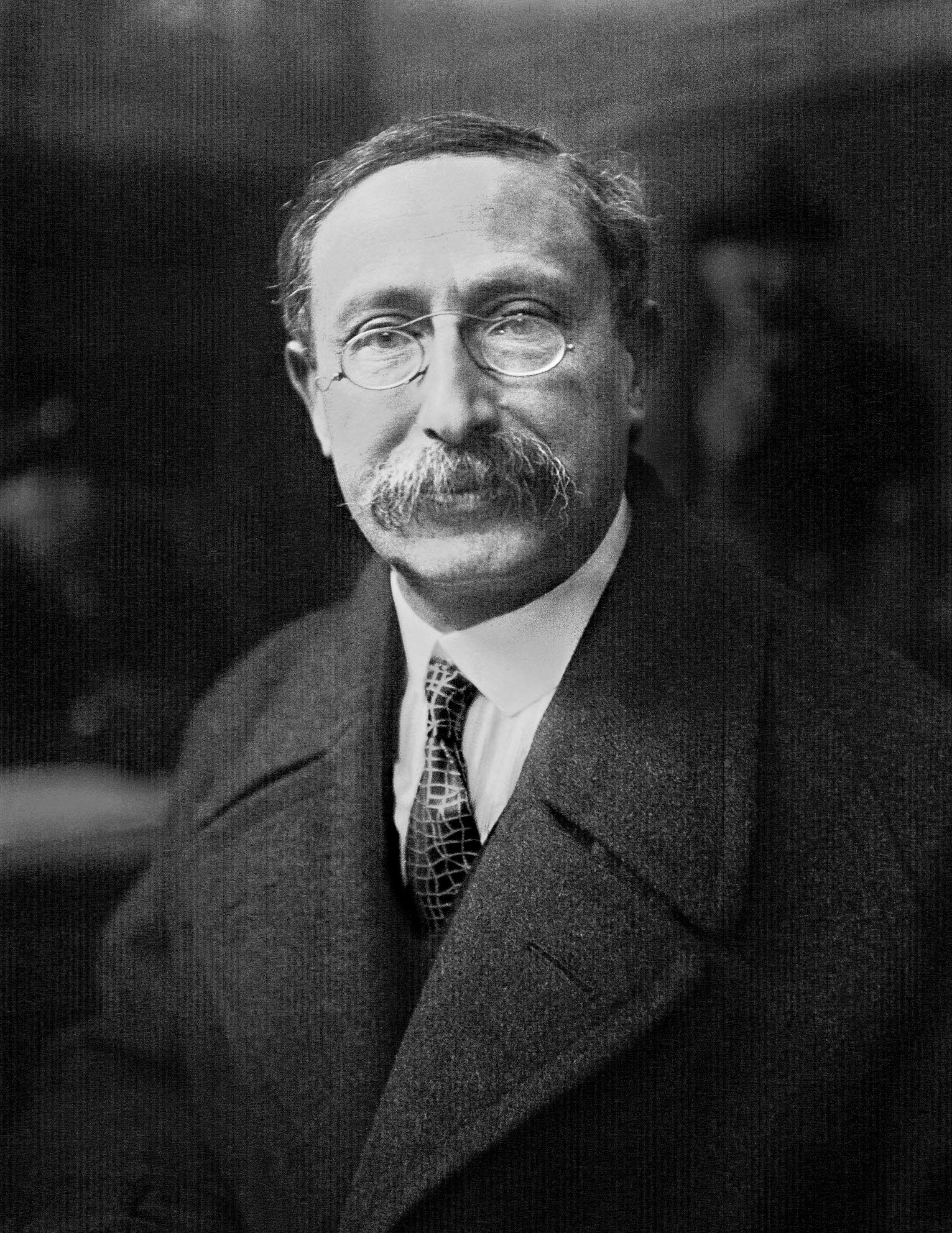
Blum in 1927

Blum led the SFIO through the 1920s and 1930s. Blum was always very neatly dressed in his suit with his pince-nez glasses, an unlikely appearance for the leader of a party meant to represent the working class. However, Blum had loyally supported the war effort in World War I, but had not held a ministerial rank as Thomas and Renaudel had. Blum won respect for standing up to Communist heckling and threats of violence at Socialist rallies, and was famed for being able to "work magic with words". The Communists had taken control of the leading socialist newspaper L'Humanité, so on 6 April 1921, Blum adopted Le Populaire as the party's newspaper, with himself as the editor.

In a 1922 speech, Blum expressed his disagreement with Communism, saying the Bolshevik regime in Russia was not a "dictatorship of the proletariat", but rather a "dictatorship over the proletariat". In the same speech, he called for a socialism that "will improve the condition of women, children, emotional life, and family life". Central to his critique of Bolshevism was his criticism that "cruelty" was the essence of the Communist regime in Soviet Russia, which he contrasted with the "humanism" that he saw as the essence of socialism.

In the May 1924 election, Blum had the Socialists join the centre-left cartel des gauches alliance, which won, with the Socialists going from 55 seats to 104 seats in the Chamber of Deputies. On 31 May 1924, Édouard Herriot, the leader of the Radical Socialist Party, asked for Blum to join the government he was forming. Blum refused, merely promising that the Socialists would support Herriot's government in the Chamber. Blum feared that entering the cabinet would cause the Socialists to lose votes to the Communists since inevitably the Socialists would have to compromise on some of their principles in office. Despite Blum not entering the cabinet, French newspapers portrayed France as governed by "a republic of professors" headed by a triumvirate of intellectuals, namely Herriot, Blum, and Paul Painlevé, the leader of the Socialist Republicans. Blum supported the Herriot government in forcing the resignation of President Alexandre Millerand, and the government's anti-clerical bills designed to weaken the influence of the Catholic Church over French life.

In foreign policy, Blum supported the Herriot government's conciliatory policy towards Germany, and he voted for the Locarno Pact in 1925. Blum also declared himself a supporter of the League of Nations, and favored establishing diplomatic relations with the Soviet Union.

Blum wanted the Herriot government to impose taxes on capital and consolidate of Treasury bonds to assist with paying off France's massive war debts to Britain and the United States, measures that Herriot was opposed to. On 25 March 1925, Blum wrote to Herriot urging him to impose the taxes and "to break with all delays, vain hopes, half hopes, half measures". Herriot's attempt to bring in the tax increases that Blum wanted caused the downfall of his government on 11 April 1925, which was defeated in the Senate when a number of Radical senators voted with the conservatives against the tax increases, a blow that the cartel des gauches never really recovered from. Despite being a member of the cartel des gauches, Blum had the Socialists vote against a number of government bills in the Chamber that would have cut the salaries and pensions of civil servants to assist with paying off the war debts, which caused much tension with his allies in the Radical Party.

In the 1928 election, the conservatives were victorious and Blum lost his seat in Paris to the Communist Jacques Duclos. Blum was returned to the Chamber of Deputies in a by-election in May 1929.

In 1929, Blum, along with Albert Einstein, attended the founding of the Jewish Agency in Jerusalem, where both Blum and Einstein spoke in favor of Zionism. In October 1929, Édouard Daladier, the leader of the left wing of the Radical Party, invited Blum and the Socialists to join his government, which Blum refused because it would mean compromising his principles and would drive Socialist voters into the arms of the Communists. At a Socialist Party congress in January 1930, Marcel Déat gave a strong speech in favor of taking up Daladier's offer, but Blum's speech in opposition carried the congress by a vote of 2,066 against to 1,057 for. In the 1932 election, fought under the shadow of the Great Depression, the Radicals and the Socialists made gains. Blum once again promised to support a government headed by Herriot, but as before would not enter the cabinet. Instead he proposed a set of demands for cabinet participation that he knew were too left-wing for Herriot to accept. In foreign policy, Blum's main theme was the need to strengthen the League of Nations along with a fervent support for disarmament. Blum consistently argued that the millions of francs spent on defense was wasteful, and the francs would be better used in social programs to alleviate the Great Depression.

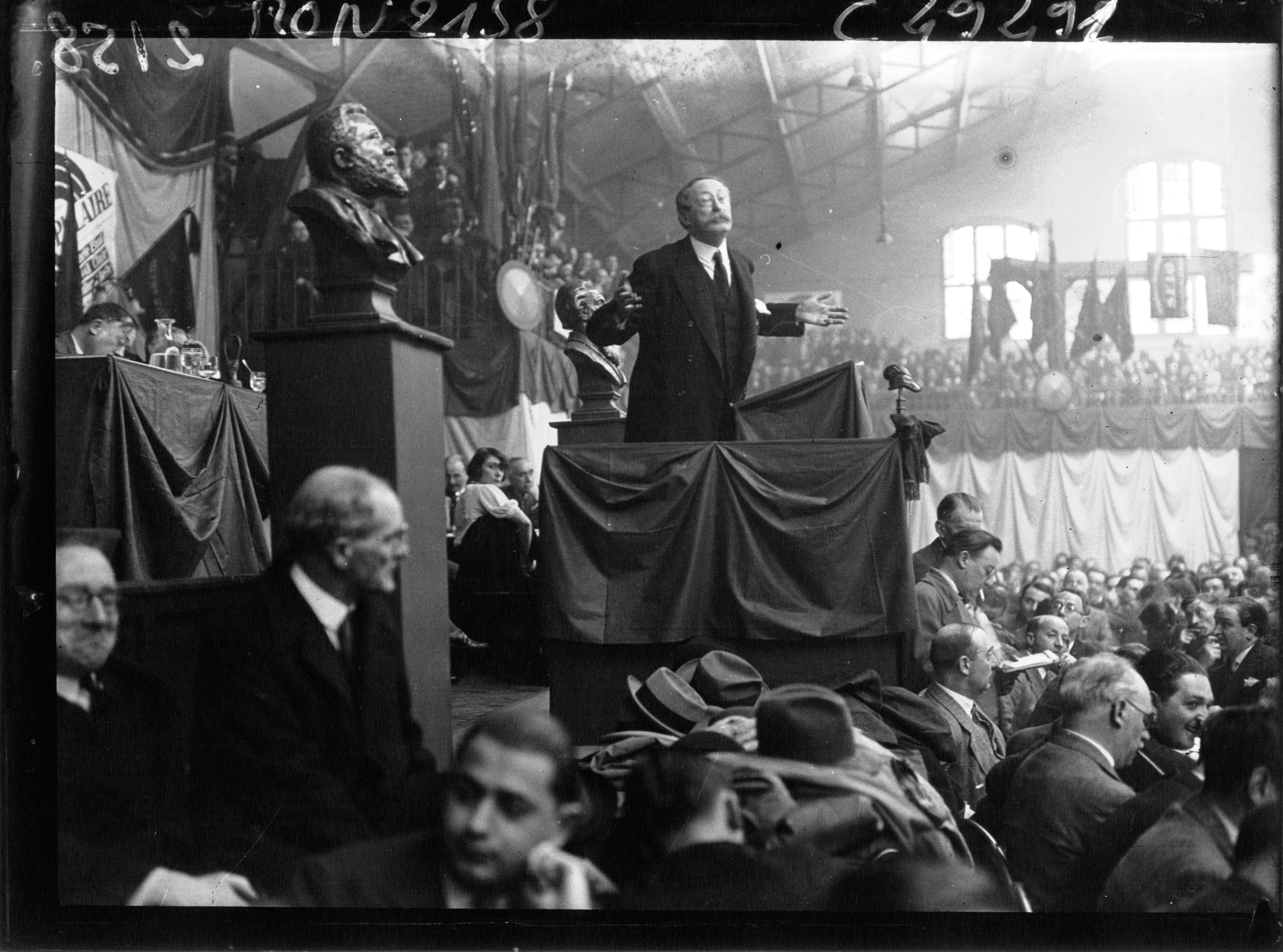
Blum speaks to a socialist party congress in Paris in 1932

In December 1932, Blum and the Socialists broke with Herriot when he insisted on continuing to pay war debts to the United States, and he voted to default on the war debts on 15 December 1932, which thereby brought down Herriot's government. Blum privately admitted that defaulting on the war debts was unwise, but he argued in the face of the Great Depression, most French people did not understand why France was giving the first priority to repaying wealthy Wall Street investors instead of helping the millions left destitute by the Depression. In January 1933, Blum and the Socialists brought down the Radical government of Joseph Paul-Boncour when he proposed cuts to the salaries of civil servants to help deal with the economic crisis caused by the Great Depression. By this stage, Blum had acquired the unenviable reputation as someone who refused to take the responsibility of power, who acted in a purely negative and irresponsible fashion by bringing down Radical governments without being prepared to propose constructive ideas and solutions. The appointment of Adolf Hitler as chancellor of Germany on 30 January 1933 did not at first change Blum's views about defense spending; he remained resolutely opposed. Blum had always felt that the Treaty of Versailles was too harsh towards Germany, and the best way to deal with Hitler was to disarm France down to the same level as the Treaty of Versailles had disarmed Germany, which he believed would end any threat from the Third Reich. For a considerable period of time, Blum believed revising the Treaty of Versailles in favor of Germany was the best and most reasonable way of dealing with Hitler. Blum put great hopes in the World Disarmament Conference held in Geneva between 1932 and 1934, and tended to cast the French government as the villain with for its warnings that German rearmament would mean another world war. Blum's favored formula was "la paix désarméé" ("peace and disarmament") and "security through arbitration and disarmament". Alongside these beliefs was an intense opposition to "French militarism" as Blum had a marked distrust of the French Army generals whose politics tended towards the right. He believed warnings about Germany were merely scaremongering to increase the military budget at the expense of social spending. Renaudel criticized Blum on the grounds the "spread of fascism in Europe" required the Socialists to vote for military credits.

In 1933, Blum came into conflict with Renaudel, who kept pressing for the Socialists to enter the cabinet in alliance with the Radicals on the grounds that some power was better than none, and who charged that Blum was an ineffectual leader more concerned about keeping his principles pure than with achieving anything. Blum was also opposed to a neo-Socialist group led by Déat and Adrien Marquet who wanted a more nationalistic and authoritarian socialism, as both Déat and Marquet charged that democracy had failed in the face of the Depression, and a dictatorship was needed. At Socialist Party congresses in April and July 1933 Blum and Faure accused Renaudel of wanting to "remain in tow" behind the Radicals, and charged that Renaudel had betrayed party principles by calling for increased military spending. At a Socialist Party congress in July 1933, Blum had the neo-Socialist fraction censured for advocating a dictatorship, saying he was for democracy. In October 1933, Daladier, once again serving as premier, brought in a bill to cut pensions and salaries of civil servants, which Blum had the Socialists vote against, causing the downfall of Daladier's government. The debate about when to support Daladier led to Renaudel being expelled, as Renaudel had argued for support for Daladier, who had also advocated increased military spending in the face of Hitler, which Renaudel stated was the most important issue. The same party congress that saw Renaudel expelled also saw the expulsion of Déat and his neo-Socialist faction, which cost the Socialists 28 Deputies and 7 Senators.

Blum was greatly shaken by the Stavisky affair in early 1934, which along with the riots by royalists and fascists pushed France to a state that seemed to many to being very close to civil war. The Stavisky affair forced the resignation of premier Camille Chautemps on 30 January 1934 and led to Daladier forming another government. On 6 February 1934, a group of royalists and fascists attempted to storm the National Assembly; Blum always saw this as a fascist coup attempt, and argued that the main danger facing France was fascism. On 7 February 1934, Blum approached Daladier to propose an alliance between the Radicals and the Socialists against the fascists, saying that French democracy was in peril. This marked the beginning of what became the Popular Front. After the Stavisky riots caused the downfall of Daladier's government, a new government was formed by Gaston Doumergue, who offered Blum a seat in the cabinet which he refused. Blum noted that most of Doumergue's ministers were centre-right (Herriot) or right (Louis Barthou, André Tardieu, and Marshal Philippe Pétain), saying he would be powerless in such a cabinet. On 17 April 1934, Foreign Minister Barthou accused Hitler of dealing in bad faith for Germany's return to the World Disarmament Conference and stated that France would look after its own security. Blum came out in opposition to the Barthou note, which he described as starting a new arms race.

Herriot continued to take part in the right-learning coalition governments that followed the riot of 6 February 1934, while being opposed by the left-leaning "young Radicals" such as Pierre Cot and Jean Zay, who wanted an alliance with the Socialists and Communists. Daladier, the long-time rival of Herriot, quietly encouraged the "young Radicals" as a way to undermine his leadership. In the spring of 1934, the Comintern changed its policy. On 31 May 1934 an article appeared in Pravda that was reprinted in L'Humanité the same day, stating that Communists should work with Socialists against fascists. In June 1934, the Communists suggested to Blum that the Socialists and Communists hold a joint demonstration against Nazi Germany. Blum was wary of the Communist offer, but many of the younger Socialist activists were not, and Blum was driven forward by them. On 2 July 1934 they held a joint anti-Nazi demonstration with the Communists without seeking Blum's approval. In an editorial in Le Populaire on 10 July 1934, Blum stated he was willing to work with the Communists against fascism, but he would not be a "dupe" of the Communists, whom Blum had a deep distrust of. On 27 July 1934, Blum signed a pact with the Communists for an anti-fascist platform. The pressure for a Popular Front came more from the Communist leader Maurice Thorez, following the new line from the Comintern. In October 1934 he called for "a Popular Front of work, liberty, and peace". while Blum played a more passive role. Blum did not trust Thorez, and was wary of his offers for an alliance. Faure, still an influential figure in the Socialist Party, charged that the new anti-fascist line from the Comintern was all part of a devious scheme by Stalin to start another world war to bring Communist regimes to power everywhere. The opposition from Faure and his followers imposed constraints on Blum's ability to form an alliance with the Communists.

In May 1935, the French Premier Pierre Laval signed an alliance with Stalin in Moscow, and the Comintern ordered the French Communists to support increased defense spending in France, which left Blum in the odd position of criticizing the Communists for supporting it. Blum voted for the Franco-Soviet alliance under the grounds it was "not to make war, but to prevent it". He took the contradictory line of supporting disarmament as the best way to achieve peace while also stating he was opposed to aggression from the fascist states. In 1935 Blum voted against extending compulsory military service from one year to two years, saying he wanted France "to disarm on its own as much as is necessary in order to encourage an international agreement". The same year, Democratic Republican politician Paul Reynaud and his acolyte Charles de Gaulle championed a plan for an elite corps of armored divisions. Blum voted against this on the grounds it would be a "praetorian guard" that would meddle in politics. At the same time, Blum and the other Socialists voted with the "young Radicals" in the Chamber of Deputies against the deflationary policy of the Laval government, which formed the basis of an alliance. The Popular Front was founded on Bastille Day 1935. Blum, Radical Édouard Daladier and Communist Maurice Thorez marched from the Place de la Bastille to the Place de la Nation in Paris with thousands of supporters who were carrying tricolores and red flags and singing La Marseillaise. The speeches given that day emphasized that fascism would never be allowed to come to power in France, that what had happened in Italy and Germany would be opposed to the utmost in France.

During the Ethiopian crisis, Blum supported the League of Nations and harshly criticised Benito Mussolini for his invasion of Ethiopia launched on 3 October 1935. Blum was very critical of Laval's foreign policy for seeking an alliance with Italy, which led to Laval being opposed to the League of Nations imposing oil sanctions on Italy. As a permanent veto-holding member of the League Council (the executive council of the League), the threat of a French veto led to the sanctions that were imposed on Italy being watered down, and oil (which Italy lacked) was never included in the sanctions lists of material forbidden to Italy. Blum was strongly against the Hoare–Laval Pact in December 1935 that essentially rewarded Mussolini for invading Ethiopia, and his speeches in the Chamber helped to bring down Laval's government, something that Laval never forgave him for. The failure of the League of Nations sanctions against Italy marked the beginning of a change in Blum's views about rearmament as he was forced to concede that sanctions did not always work, and that in face of aggression military force was justified as a means of self-defense.

== Popular Front government of 1936–1940 ==
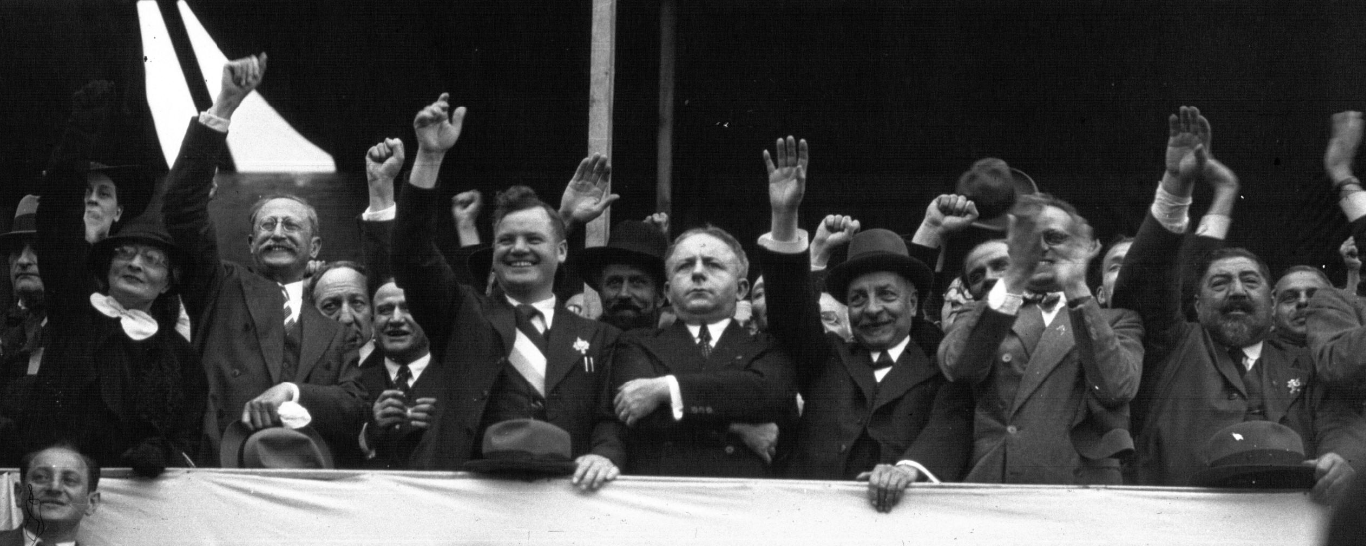
Blum alongside Radical leader Édouard Daladier and Communist leader Maurice Thorez at a Popular Front rally, 14 July 1936

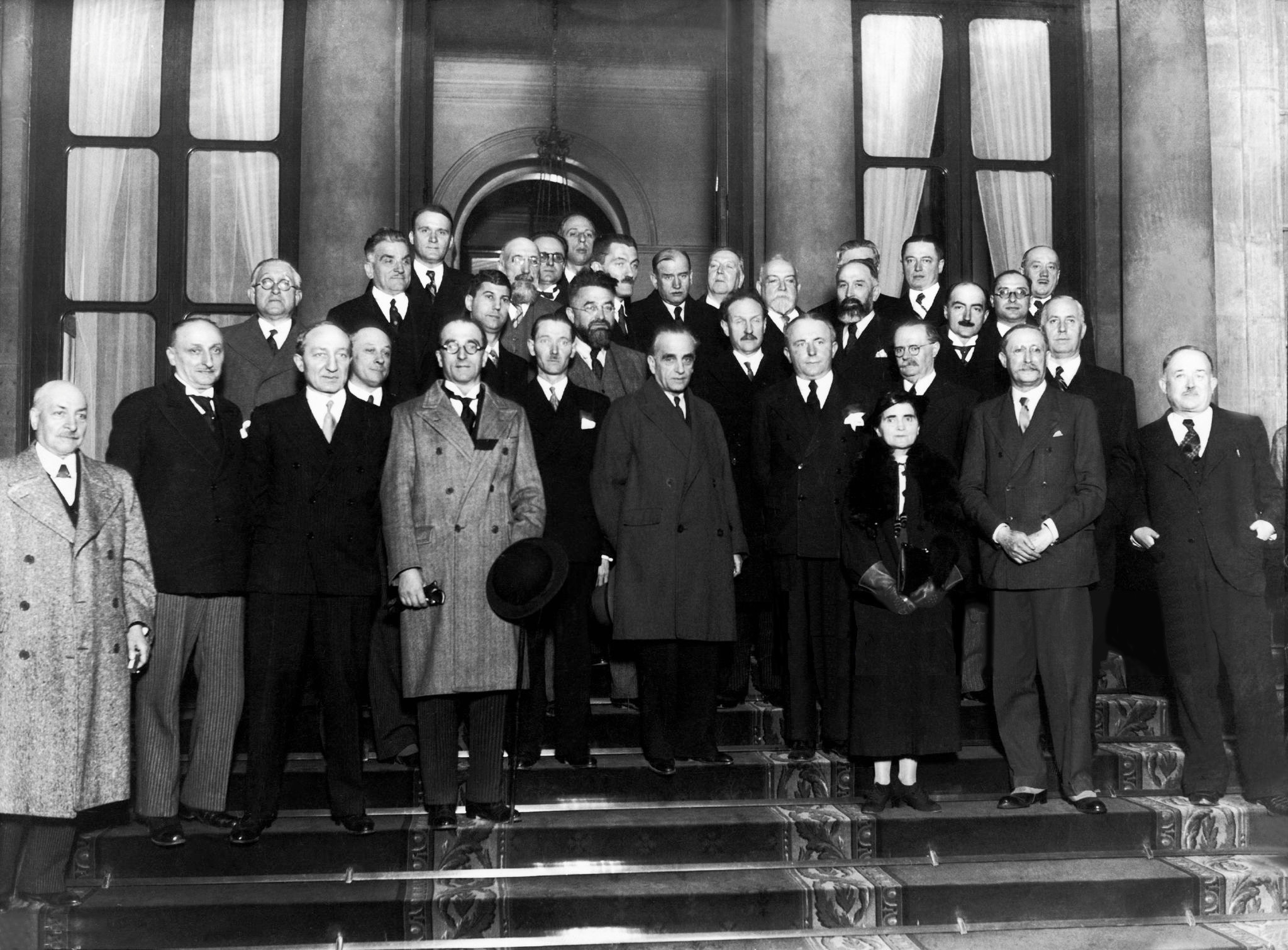
Blum and his first government, June 1936

Blum was elected as Deputy for Narbonne in 1929, and was re-elected in 1932 and 1936. In 1933, he expelled Marcel Déat, Pierre Renaudel, and other neosocialists from the SFIO. Political circumstances changed in 1934, when the rise of German dictator Adolf Hitler and fascist riots in Paris caused Stalin and the French Communists to change their policy. In 1935 all the parties of left and centre formed the Popular Front. France had not successfully recovered from the worldwide economic depression, wages had fallen and the working class demanded reforms. The Popular Front won a sweeping victory in June 1936. The Popular Front won a solid majority with 386 seats out of 608. For the first time, the Socialists won more seats than the Radicals; they formed an effective coalition. As Socialist leader Blum became Prime Minister of France and the first socialist to hold that office, he formed a cabinet that included 20 Socialists, 13 Radicals and two Socialist Republicans. The Communists won 15 percent of the vote, and 12 percent of the seats. They supported the government, although they refused to take any cabinet positions. For the first time, the cabinet included three women in minor roles, even though women were not able to vote. Blum had long been accused by his critics within the Socialist Party of avoiding the responsibility of power as he was accursed of wanting to be the leader of a perpetual opposition party rather than compromising his principles, leading Blum to give a speech that he had decided to embrace the responsibility of office to achieve the social change he had long promised.

=== Labour policies ===
The election of the left-wing government brought a wave of strikes, involving two million workers, and the seizure of many factories. The strikes were spontaneous and unorganised, but nevertheless the business community panicked and met secretly with Blum, who negotiated a series of reforms, and then gave labour unions the credit for the Matignon Accords. The new laws:

- gave workers the right to strike
- initiated collective bargaining
- legislated the mandating of 12 days of paid annual leave
- legislated a 40-hour working week (outside of overtime)
- raised wages (15% for the lowest-paid workers, and 7% for the relatively well-paid)
- stipulated that employers would recognise shop stewards
- ensured that there would be no retaliation against strikers

The government legislated its promised reforms as rapidly as possible. On 11 June, the Chamber of Deputies voted for the forty-hour workweek, the restoration of civil servants' salaries, and two weeks' paid holidays, by a majority of 528 to 7. The Senate voted in favour of these laws within a week. Blum persuaded the workers to accept pay raises and go back to work. Wages increased sharply; in two years the national average was up 48 percent. However inflation also rose 46%. The imposition of the 40-hour week proved highly inefficient, as industry had a difficult time adjusting to it. The economic confusion hindered the rearmament effort, and the rapid growth of German armaments alarmed Blum. He launched a major program to speed up arms production. The cost forced the abandonment of the social reform programmes that the Popular Front had counted heavily on.

=== Additional reforms ===
By mid-August 1936, the parliament had voted for:

- the creation of a national Office du blé (Grain Board or Wheat Office, through which the government helped to market agricultural produce at fair prices for farmers) to stabilise prices and curb speculation
- the nationalisation of the arms industries
- loans to small and medium-sized industries
- the raising of the compulsory school-attendance age to 14 years
- a major public works programme

It also raised the pay, pensions, and allowances of public-sector workers and ex-servicemen. The 1920 Sales Tax, opposed by the Left as a tax on consumers, was abolished and replaced by a production tax, which was considered to be a tax on the producer instead of the consumer. Blum dissolved the far-right fascist leagues. In turn, the Popular Front was actively fought by right-wing and far-right movements, which often used antisemitic slurs against Blum and other Jewish ministers. The Cagoule far-right group even staged bombings to disrupt the government.

=== Foreign policy ===
The most important issue in French foreign policy was the Remilitarization of the Rhineland on 7 March 1936 in defiance of the Treaty of Versailles, which had declared it to be a permanent demilitarized zone. With the Rhineland remilitarized, for the first time since 1918, German military forces could menace France directly, and equally importantly the Germans started to build the Siegfried Line along the Franco-German border. The assumption behind the French alliance system in Eastern Europe was that the French Army would use the demilitarized status of the Rhineland to launch an offensive into western Germany if the Reich should invade any of France's allies in Eastern Europe, namely Poland, Czechoslovakia, Romania and Yugoslavia. With the building of the Siegfried Line, it was possible for Germany to invade any of France's Eastern European allies with the majority of the Wehrmacht being sent east, and the remainder of the Wehrmacht staying on the defensive in the Rhineland to halt any French offensive into Germany, a situation that boded ill for the survival of the French alliance system in Eastern Europe. A further complication for the French was the greater population of Germany as France could only field a third of the young men that the Reich could field, along with the greater size of the German economy. To even the odds against the Reich, it was the unanimous opinion of all French foreign policy and military experts that France needed allies. The nation that France wanted the most as an ally was Great Britain, which had the world's largest navy and provided that Britain made the "continental commitment" of sending another large expeditionary force to France like the BEF of the First World War would allow the French to face any challenge from Germany on more even terms. The need for the "continental commitment" allowed Britain to have a sort of veto power over French foreign policy in the interwar period as the French wanted the "continental commitment" very badly, and thus could not afford to alienate the British too much. The other major ally the French wanted was the Soviet Union. However, the lack of a common German-Soviet frontier, the unwillingness of Romania and especially Poland to grant the Red Army transit rights, and the strong British dislike of the alliance that the French signed with the Soviet Union in 1935 all presented problems from the French viewpoint. Blum's foreign policy was one of attempting to improve relations with Germany to avoid a war while seeking to strengthen France's alliances and to conclude an alliance with Britain.

One of Blum's first actions as premier was to nationalize French arms industry, which gave the Defense Minister Édouard Daladier immense power. Blum saw nationalization of the arms industry as a way to prevent "merchants of death" from causing a war, but Daladier saw nationalization as a way to catch up in the arms race. Daladier boasted that he now had powers equal to those of the German War Minister Werner von Blomberg and the Soviet Defense Commissar Kliment Voroshilov. The Popular Front government troubled reactionary Catholic French Army officers such as Maxime Weygand-who made little effort to hide his disapproval-but on 10 June 1936 General Maurice Gamelin met with Blum to tell him that the French Army was apolitical and that he would ensure that the Army would stay out of politics.

Following a botched coup d'état on 17 July 1936, a civil war broke out in Spain. Blum initially allowed weapons to be shipped to the Frente Popular government, but the arms shipments to the Spanish Republic caused much opposition from Britain. Blum saw the Frente popular government in Madrid as a natural ally of the Front populaire government in Paris and did not want a pro-Axis Spain as a neighbor. He immediately allowed arms to be shipped to Spain. Charles Corbin, the French ambassador in London, strongly advised Blum to cease the arms shipments to the Spanish Republicans. Corbin warned that the government of Stanley Baldwin was strongly against French arms for the Spanish republic, and that France could not afford a rift with Britain over Spain given the threat posed by Germany. Alexis St. Léger, the secretary-general of the Quai d'Orsay, met Blum to tell him that France needed Britain more than Britain needed France, and the French could not afford to antagonize the British for the sake of the Spanish Republic. The need for British support played a major role in causing Blum to cease the arms shipments to Spain and instead have France join the ineffectual Non-Intervention Committee. In July 1936, the League of Nations ended the sanctions imposed on Italy for invading Ethiopia, and therefore, France ended its sanctions on Italy. The French tried hard to revive the Stresa Front after the sanctions on Italy were ended and as the American historian Barry Sullivan noted "...the French displayed an almost humiliating determination to retain Italy as an ally". Benito Mussolini rejected all of the French overtures and instead aligned Italy with Germany. Sullivan noted: "...Germany, which consistently treated Italy worse than did the other two countries, was rewarded with Mussolini's friendship; France, which generally offered Italy the highest level of co-operation and true partnership, was rewarded with rebuffs and abuse.". The prospect of an Italian-German alliance threatened to divert French resources from a potential conflict with Germany, and drove the French into seeking closer ties with Britain as a counterbalance.

Shortly after his election, Blum together with his entire cabinet visited the German embassy to meet the new German ambassador, Count Johannes von Welczeck, to tell him that France wanted good relations with Germany and that his government intended to return to the "Locarno era" of the 1920s (i.e. friendship with Germany). German propaganda constantly stressed that one of the many alleged "injustices" of the Treaty of Versailles was the loss of Germany's African colonies and demanded that all of the former African colonies "go home to the Reich". Blum believed that the colonial question was the principal problem in Franco-German relations and that there was a "moderate" faction within the German government led by the Reichsbank president Dr. Hjalmar Schacht who were both willing and able to restrain Adolf Hitler. During the 1936 election, Blum had run on an anti-militarist platform that called for "bread, peace and freedom" while he had promised to end the arms race by converting from an "armed peace" into a "disarmed peace". When Schacht approached Blum with an offer to end the arms race in exchange for the return of former German African colonies, Blum took him up on his offer. In August 1936, Schacht visited Paris where he met Blum to discuss a possible deal under which France would return the former German African colonies administered by France as mandates for the League of Nations and the end of the trade wars in Europe in exchange for Germany cutting back dramatically its level of military spending. Blum told Schacht that he was willing to return French Togoland (modern Togo) and French Cameroon (modern Cameroon) to Germany as the price of peace, and pursued this line of negotiation with Schacht well into 1937. However, Blum also told Schacht that France would not be bullied as he stated: "We believe our position is stronger than a few months ago. France does not tremble in the face of war, but does not want war". Blum still held hopes that the arms race in Europe could be ended, and feeling that the Treaty of Versailles was excessively harsh, he welcomed Schacht's offer, which seemed to be a sincere proposal to end the arms race. The British Foreign Secretary Anthony Eden who visited Paris told Blum he was "thoroughly astounded" by his talks with Schacht, which he warned that the British government would be opposed under the grounds if France returned the former German colonies in Africa to the Reich it would pressure for Britain, South Africa, Australia and New Zealand to return the former German colonies they administered as mandates for the League of Nations.

Schacht gave Blum the impression that he held more power in Berlin than was actually the case, and that the key to preventing another world war lay in the restoration of the German colonial empire in Africa. At the time, Schacht was losing a power struggle over the control of German economic policy to the other Nazi leaders and he was keen for a foreign policy success such as the restoration of Germany's former African colonies that might restore his prestige with Hitler. Blum had good relations with both Welczeck and Schacht whom he viewed as "rational, civilized Europeans" whom it was possible for him to negotiate with. Notably, Hitler refused to see Blum under any conditions and Welczeck was Blum's main conduit with the Reich government. In September 1936, Hitler at the Nuremberg Party Rally launched the Four Year Plan to have the German economy ready for a "total war" by September 1940, which greatly alarmed Blum. In response to the Four Year Plan, Blum launched what the American historian Joseph Maiolo called "the biggest arms program ever attempted by a French government in peacetime". Intelligence from the Deuxième Bureau and André François-Poncet, the French ambassador in Berlin, showed that the factories of the major German armaments firms such as Krupp AG, Rheinmetall AG and Borsig AG were running at full capacity as the German state seemed to have a limitless appetite for arms. All the intelligence from François-Poncet and the Deuxième Bureau indicated that Germany was preparing for a major war in the near future. The fact that Germany had an economy three times larger than France's ensured that the Reich had a massive lead in the arms race. However, the French took consolation in the fact that Germany had to import a number of crucial raw materials such as high-grade iron and oil that the Reich lacked, thereby making Germany very vulnerable to a naval blockade. However, there was the caveat that many of the raw materials that Germany lacked could be found in eastern Europe and if Germany were to obtain such raw materials in eastern Europe via alliances or conquests, the German economy would be immune to a blockade. As such from the French viewpoint it was crucial to keep Eastern Europe out of the German sphere of influence. The War Minister, Édouard Daladier asked the commander of the military, General Maurice Gamelin to submit a four-year plan for military modernization. When Gamelin handed in a plan that was budgeted at 9 billion francs for the French Army, Daladier rejected it as too low and added an extra 5 billion francs. During an "emotional" interview with Blum, Daladier persuaded him to accept the 14 billion franc plan as he warned that Germany was winning the arms race at present. On 7 September 1936, the Blum cabinet approved Daladier's 14 billion franc plan for rearmament.

At the time the franc was overvalued, as it was still based on the gold standard. Blum, however, had promised during the election to uphold the gold standard, in order to reassure voters worried about inflation. In the expectation of the franc being devalued, throughout the prior year, investors had been moving a massive amount of capital and gold out of France. The overvalued franc made French exports expensive while making foreign imports cheaper in comparison with French goods. The sums allocated to the arms race with some 21 billion francs for the French military committed in total accelerated this capital flight as bond investors saw the Popular Front's fiscal policies as irresponsible. Maiolo wrote: "Everyone knew the Popular Front could not cut the deficit and fund work creation projects, nationalize the arms industry and buy arms without borrowing. By hoarding their capital abroad, private speculators in effect vetoed the policies of the Popular Front". By mid-September 1936 France's gold reserves had fallen close to 50 billion francs, which was the minimum amount considered necessary to fund rearmament. To stabilize the economy and pay for rearmament, Blum engaged in secret talks for Anglo-American financial support. On 26 September 1936, the franc was devalued while on the same day an economic agreement on currency stabilization with the United States and the United Kingdom was announced. In a show of support for Blum, neither the Americans nor the British increased their tariffs on French goods nor were the dollar and pound devalued in response, which allowed the French to increase their exports now made cheaper by a devalued franc. The devaluation of the franc did not prompt the return of gold and capital to France as Blum had hoped, and Blum was forced to turn towards Britain to ask for a loan to stabilize the franc, which gave the British leverage over his government. Blum's experience in government left him convinced that it was the traders on the bond markets that really dominated the world, not national governments as he constantly faced himself having to adjust his policies to appease the bond markets. Blum seriously considered pursuing autarky and exchange controls as a way to pay for rearmament as he told the cabinet "by attempting to oppose fascism's bid for power...one is too often tempted to follow its footsteps". However, Blum was told by the Finance ministry that "Germany is on the verge of an economic and financial catastrophe because of rearmament". Moreover, the Radical Party threatened to pull out of the Popular Front if exchange controls were imposed and both American and British diplomats quietly told Blum that neither the United States nor the United Kingdom would support France if it imposed exchange controls. Blum told the Chamber of Deputies: "The logical inclination of our internal policy would lead us to adopt coercive measures against the export of capital and currency speculation. But that would be to create a contradiction between our policy which seeks a community of action with the great Anglo-Saxon nations and the signing of a monetary agreement aimed at restoring activity and liberty to international trade".

As the talks with Schacht faltered, Blum turned towards the alliance with the Soviet Union and France's other eastern European allies. The Blum government attempted to build an institutional bond to link France on a collective basis with the Little Entente alliance of Czechoslovakia, Yugoslavia and Romania. After the remilitarization of the Rhineland, both King Carol II of Romania and Milan Stojadinović of Yugoslavia rejected the French offer and preferred to move closer to Germany out of the belief that France would do nothing to assist their nations in the event of a German invasion. Even President Edvard Beneš of Czechoslovakia-generally regarded as the Eastern European leader most committed to upholding his country's alliance with France-attempted to improve his relations with Germany after the Rhineland remilitarization. Franco-Polish relations had been badly strained ever since the German-Polish non-aggression pact of 1934, but in the aftermath of the Rhineland remilitarization, the Polish Foreign Minister Colonel Józef Beck expressed the wish for French financial and military aid to modernize the Polish military. Beck's friendship with Hermann Göring led to doubts on Blum's part about his precise loyalty to France, but the fact that Germany was still laying claim to the Polish corridor, Upper Silesia and the Free City of Danzig suggested that the German-Polish rapprochement might be only ephemeral. Blum told Daladier and Gamelin: "We cannot live this way. We are bound by an alliance with a state and a people, yet we have so little confidence in them that we hesitate to deliver them arms, designs, plans-for the fear that they will betray us and deliver them to the enemy. We must know whether the Poles are our allies or not". Blum sent Gamelin to Warsaw to ask Marshal Edward Rydz-Śmigły, another member of the triumvirate that was the leadership of the Sanacja military dictatorship, to dismiss Beck as foreign minister. Rydz-Śmigły insisted that his country was still committed to upholding the Franco-Polish alliance, but refused to sack Beck. In September 1936, Rydz-Śmigły visited Paris for two weeks, and Blum met him several times to request that he sack Beck. Beck was not dismissed, but Blum signed an agreement for France to provide the money to allow Poland to create an arms industry. In regards to Asia, Blum appointed Émile Naggiar as the French ambassador to China with instructions to provide French aid to assist with the modernization of China as a way to counterbalance the power of Japan.

In October 1936, William Christian Bullitt Jr. arrived as the new American ambassador in Paris. Besides being the first American ambassador to France in the last 16 years who actually spoke French, Bullitt was one of the best friends of President Franklin D. Roosevelt with whom he spoke on the telephone once a day. Blum had a very close friendship with Bullitt, a man he greatly liked and admired. Though Blum never met Roosevelt, he admired him and he openly admitted that his social reforms were based on the New Deal as Blum declared in a speech: "Seeing him [Roosevelt] act, the French democracy has a feeling that an example was traced for it, and it is this example we are following". Bullitt came to be an influential man in France and was known as the "unofficial minister without portfolio" in the French cabinet. Knowing that Bullitt was one of the best friends of Roosevelt, Blum tried hard to use him to get the United States more involved in Europe. Blum told Bullitt: "America alone of the great powers was genuinely interested in the same policies he was trying to put through. The British government was working with him wholeheartedly and sincerely in certain fields but because it was a Conservative government it disapproved highly of his domestic policy and the sympathy he received in London was therefore half-hearted".

Of France's eastern European allies, the one that Blum considered the most important was the Soviet Union. Blum's past battles with the French Communists made him wary of Soviet Russia, but he noted that the Soviet Union was easily the most powerful of France's eastern European allies. Blum favored what he called his "grand design" under which first Anglo-French relations would be strengthened, to be followed by a strengthening of Franco-Soviet relations, and finally France would play the matchmaker and achieve an Anglo-Soviet rapprochement. Blum's ultimate aim was to recreate "a combination reproducing the Triple Entente before 1914". Blum was later to claim that his "grand design" would have prevented World War Two as he stated in 1947: "The close rapprochement of the Anglo-Saxon and French democracies with Soviet Russia, that is to say, an international Popular Front, would have been the salvation of the peace". The Franco-Soviet alliance had been signed in May 1935, but no staff talks had been opened to draft operational plans. By the fall of 1936, the Soviets were openly impatient and pressing for Franco-Soviet staff talks as it was noted that a military alliance without staff talks for a military convention was in effect worthless. Blum appointed Robert Coulondre as the French ambassador in Moscow with orders to strengthen the Franco-Soviet alliance. When Coulondre presented his credentials as an ambassador for France to Soviet Chairman Mikhail Kalinin, he was told quite bluntly that if the French were really serious about the alliance, staff talks should have been started some time ago. On 6 November 1936, Blum ordered Daladier and Gamelin to open Franco-Soviet staff talks with the aim of concluding a military convention to give effect to the Franco-Soviet alliance. On 9 November 1936, Blum told the Soviet ambassador, Vladimir Potemkin, that it was "a step forward" for France and the Soviet Union to begin staff talks.

Because Germany's population was larger than France's, the French Army had been heavily dependent upon manpower recruited in the Maghreb in the First World War and it was expected to be so again in another war. By 1936, over one-third of the French Army was being recruited in the Maghreb, making France the European nation most dependent upon its colonial soldiers. The need to bring over soldiers from Morocco, Algeria and Tunisia in turn required control of the western Mediterranean Sea. The increasing hostile stance of Fascist Italy towards France led to fears in Paris that Italy would ally itself with the Reich and that the Regia Marina would cut France off from the Maghreb. Much of Blum's concerns about maintaining mastery of the Mediterranean related to France's dependence upon manpower from the Maghreb. Mussolini's strident speeches in the fall of 1936 denouncing the "Jewish socialist" Blum who headed a "decadent plutodemocracy" did not augur well for the future of Franco-Italian relations. Blum sent Admiral François Darlan to London to seek staff talks between the Marine and the Royal Navy against Italy, but the effort was rejected by the Admiralty. On 4 December 1936, Blum approved a three-year naval construction program designed to make the Marine the dominant naval power in the Mediterranean. Blum praised Darlan as an admiral who "thinks exactly as I do" about a potential naval threat from Italy. Blum sacked the Naval Commander-in-Chief, the Italianophile Admiral Georges Durand-Viel who had advocated a Franco-Italian alliance and appointed Darlan as his successor. Darlan became increasing vociferous in advocating the view that France needed a strong Marine to ensure command of the sea in the Mediterranean in order to bring over soldiers from the Maghreb to help the French Army face the Wehrmacht on more equal terms. Gamelin strongly argued in favor of a renewed attempt to make an alliance with Italy under the grounds that a rapprochement with Mussolini would be cheaper than a naval arms race, but Blum chose to accept Darlan's counsel that a stronger Mediterranean Fleet was the best way of safeguarding the sea-lanes to Algeria. In a covert operation, the Deuxième Bureau started to smuggle in arms from the colony of French Somaliland (modern Djibouti) to anti-Italian guerrillas in Ethiopia as a way to tie down Italian forces in the Horn of Africa, and keep them well away from France.

In December 1936, the French Foreign Minister Yvon Delbos contacted Welczeck with an offer for joint Franco-German mediation to end the Spanish Civil War. Provided that the Spanish Civil War could be ended, Delbos was willing to begin talks on the return of the former German colonies plus agreements to end the arms race and the trade wars in Europe. In exchange, Delbos wanted an end to the Four Year Plan. On 18 December 1936, Blum met Welczeck to tell him that the entire cabinet had approved of the offer, saying this was the best chance to save the peace in Europe. Welczeck was personally in favor of accepting Blum's offer, but the German Foreign Minister, Baron Konstantin von Neurath was opposed and persuaded Hitler to reject the offer. Part of the reason for the French urgency in seeking to improve relations with the Reich was the decision on the part of Belgium to renounce the alliance with France it had signed in 1920 and declare itself neutral again. The Maginot Line covered the Franco-German border and Franco-Luxembourg border, but did not cover the Franco-Belgian border as Belgium was a French ally when construction of the line started in 1930. With Belgium neutral, a way was open for Germany to invade France again as Blum noted that France would respect Belgian neutrality, but Germany would not. The precedent of 1914 when Germany violated Belgian neutrality as the best way to invade France did not suggest that Germany would respect Belgian neutrality again. Blum ordered the Maginot line to be extended along the Franco-Belgian border, but only little work had been accomplished by 1939 and France was still very much exposed to a German invasion via Belgium. Blum met in secret with the Belgian prime minister Paul van Zeeland to ask him to allow secret Franco-Belgian staff talks to coordinate operations should Germany invade Belgium again but van Zeeland refused. By early 1937, Blum had grown disenchanted with Schacht whom he was starting to suspect had less power in Germany than what he claimed. On 30 January 1937, Hitler gave a speech to the Reichstag where he stated that he wanted the return of Germany's former African colonies without preconditions such as cuts to military spending. On 13 February 1937, Blum told the Chamber of Deputies that his government had imposed a "pause" on social reforms and a 20 billion franc plan for public works was suspended until further notice to pay for rearmament.

Despite the rejection of the offer for a colonial settlement, Blum's continuing talks with Dr. Schacht into 1937 led to concerns within the cabinet of new British prime minister Neville Chamberlain that if France returned Togoland and Cameroon to Germany, Britain would come under pressure to return Tanganyika (modern Tanzania) to Germany. The Chamberlain cabinet expressed concern over the fact that Blum had made an offer to return Togoland and Cameroon to Germany, which was felt to have weaken Britain's case for hanging onto Tanganyika. The American historian Gerhard Weinberg wrote that both the governments of Blum and Chamberlain were serious about returning the former German African colonies in some form by 1937 as he noted there was a consensus that "...the price-as perceived from London and Paris if not from Douala and Lomé-would be worth paying". However, Hitler wanted the return of the former African colonies without the conditions that Blum and Chamberlain wanted such as a drastic reduction in military spending and the end of the Four Year Plan.

The Franco-Soviet staff talks stained Anglo-French relations with British Foreign Secretary Anthony Eden telling Blum during a visit to Paris in May 1937 that his government was opposed to Franco-Soviet staff talks as dangerous to the peace of Europe, a request that Blum rejected. The Franco-Soviet staff talks came to a sudden end in June 1937 due to the Yezhovshchina ("Yezhov times"). On 12 June 1937, Marshal Mikhail Tukhachevsky along with two other Marshals of the Soviet Union were shot on charges of treason and espionage for Germany and Japan. Gamelin promptly suspended the staff talks under the grounds that since the Soviet government itself had accused Tukhachevsky of being a spy for Germany and Japan then logically all the information that he shared with Tukhachevsky must had reached Berlin and Tokyo. Gamelin stated that staff talks would only be resumed once the executions of senior Red Army officers on charges of espionage for Germany and Japan ended, saying that at present it was far too risky for the French general staff to be engaged in staff talks with the Red Army general staff given the frequency that Red Army officers kept being executed for espionage. The decision to suspend the staff talks became a major issue in Franco-Soviet relations, and Jakob Suritz, the new Soviet ambassador in Paris who replaced Potemkin, pressed Blum very strongly to have the staff talks resumed as soon as possible. Likewise, Suritz was furious over the decision to halt the arms shipments to the Spanish Republic and accused Blum of being too concerned about maintaining good Anglo-French relations.

=== Spanish Civil War ===
The Spanish Civil War broke out in July 1936 and deeply divided France. Blum adopted a policy of neutrality rather than assisting his ideological soulmates, the Spanish Left-leaning Republicans. He acted from fear of splitting his domestic alliance with the centrist Radicals, or even precipitating an ideological civil war inside France. His refusal to send arms to Spain strained his alliance with the Communists, who followed Soviet policy and demanded all-out support for the Spanish Republic. The dilemma caused by this issue led Blum to resign in June 1937. All the constituents of the French left supported the Republican government in Madrid, while the right supported the Nationalist insurgents. Blum's cabinet was deeply divided and he decided on a policy of non-intervention, and collaborated with Britain and 25 other countries to formalize an agreement against sending any munitions or volunteer soldiers to Spain. The Air Minister defied the cabinet and secretly sold warplanes to Madrid. Jackson concludes that the French government "was virtually paralyzed by the menace of civil war at home, the German danger abroad, and the weakness of her own defenses." The Republicans by 1938 were losing badly (they surrendered in 1939), sending upwards of 500,000 political refugees across the border into France, where they were held in camps.

=== Attacks on Blum ===
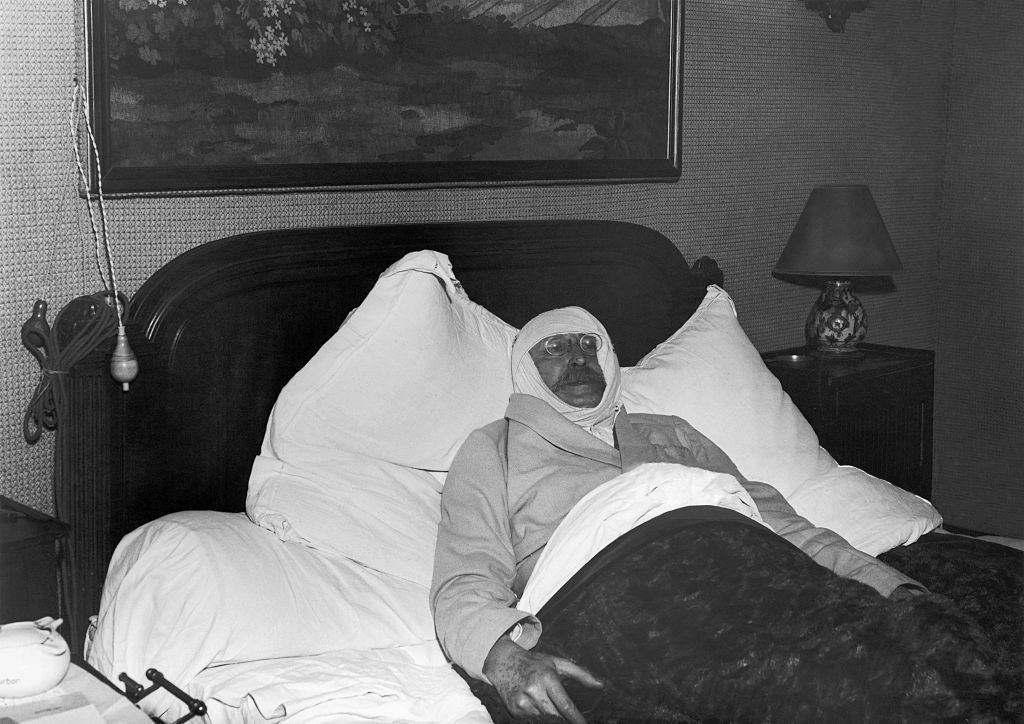
Blum recovering after the far-right attack on him, 13 February 1936

On 13 February 1936, shortly before becoming prime minister, Blum was dragged from a car and almost beaten to death by the Camelots du Roi, a group of antisemites and royalists. The group's parent organisation, the right-wing Action Française league, was dissolved by the government following this incident, not long before the elections that brought Blum to power. Blum became the first socialist and the first Jew to serve as Prime Minister of France. As such he was an object of particular hatred from antisemitic elements.

In its short life, the Popular Front government passed important legislation, including the 40-hour week, 12 paid annual holidays for the workers, collective bargaining on wage claims, and the full nationalisation of the armament and military aviation industries. This latter sweeping action had the unanticipated effect of disrupting the production of armaments at the wrong time, only three years away from the beginning of war in September 1939. Blum also attempted to pass legislation extending the rights of the Arab population of Algeria, but this was blocked by "colons", colonist representatives in the Chamber and Senate.

=== Second government in 1938 and collapse ===
Blum was briefly prime minister again in March and April 1938, long enough to ship heavy artillery and other much needed military equipment to the Spanish Republicans. Blum made a call to the parties of the centre-right to create a "sacred union" government like that which had governed France in World War One to face the present crisis, an offer that was rejected. Besides allowing arms to be shipped to Spain, on 15 March 1938 Blum proposed at a cabinet meeting that France intervene in the Spanish Civil War on the side of the Republicans. Blum told the cabinet: "Why not send General Franco an ultimatum? If, within twenty-four hours, you do not renounce the assistance of foreign troops France will resume its liberty of action and the right to intervene". As Italy and Germany had intervened on the side of the Spanish Nationalists, the majority of the cabinet led by Daladier rejected Blum's course under the grounds that it would mean war with Italy and Germany.

Blum drew up a new armament plan in early 1938 that was as he put it "analogous to the Russian Five Year Plans or Göring's Four Year Plan". To finance the armament plan, Blum planned a steep increase in taxes on income and corporate profits, to borrow on a massive scale on the bond markets, to embark on an inflationary course by printing more francs in the form of credit notes to pay for munitions, and for exchange controls to stop the expected flight of capital. The American Treasury Secretary Henry Morgenthau Jr. sent word to Blum that the Roosevelt administration would not oppose "temporary" exchange controls in France, though British prime minister Neville Chamberlain was non-committal when sounded out. Blum's armament plan was defeated in the Senate on 5 April 1938, leading to him to resign. He was unable to establish a stable ministry; on 10 April 1938, his socialist government fell and he was removed from office. In foreign policy, his government was torn between the traditional anti-militarism of the French Left and the urgency of the rising threat of Nazi Germany.

Many historians judge the Popular Front a failure in terms of economics, foreign policy, and long-term stability. "Disappointment and failure," says Jackson, "was the legacy of the Popular Front." There is general agreement that at first it created enormous excitement and expectation on the left, but in the end it failed to live up to its promise.

== End of the Popular Front ==
The new government led by Édouard Daladier cooperated with Britain. Despite being on the opposite sides of the ideological divide, starting on 14 April 1938 the Conservative MP Winston Churchill started a correspondence with Blum, sending him a series of letters written in his idiosyncratic French, encouraging him to support rearmament and oppose appeasement. During the Sudetenland crisis of 1938, Daladier accepted the offer of the British prime minister Neville Chamberlain to serve as an "honest broker" in an attempt to find a compromise. Chamberlain met with Adolf Hitler at a summit at Berchtesgaden where he agreed that the Sudetenland region of Czechoslovakia would be transferred to Germany. At a subsequent Anglo-German summit at Bad Godesberg, Hitler rejected Chamberlain's plan over a secondary issue as he demanded that the Sudetenland be transferred to Germany before 1 October 1938 while the Anglo-French plan called for a transfer to occur after 1 October. For a time in September 1938, it appeared that Europe was on brink of a war again. The fact that that issue at stake was only a secondary issue, namely the timetable for transferring the Sudetenland, after the primary issue had been settled struck many as bizarre.

When Blum learned on 28 September that an emergency summit would be held in Munich the next day to resolve the crisis, he wrote that felt "an immense response of joy and hope". On 29 September, Blum wrote in an editorial in Le Populaire newspaper: " The Munich meeting is an armful of tinder thrown on a sacred flame at the very moment the flame was flickering and threatening to go out". The Munich Agreement that ended the crisis was a compromise as it was affirmed that the Sudetenland would be transferred to Germany but only after 1 October, albeit on a schedule that favored the German demand to have the Sudetenland "go home to the Reich" as soon as possible. When the Munich Agreement was signed on 30 September 1938, Blum wrote that he felt "soulagement honteux" ("shameful relief") as he wrote that he was happy that France would not be going to war with Germany, but he felt ashamed of an agreement that favored Germany at the expense of Czechoslovakia. On 1 October 1938, Blum wrote in Le Populaire: "There is not a woman and a man to refuse MM. Neville Chamberlain and Édouard Daladier their rightful tribute of gratitude. War is avoided. The scourge recedes. Life can become natural again. One can resume one's work and sleep again. One can enjoy the beauty of an autumn sun. How would it be possible for me not to understand this sense of deliverance when I feel it myself?"

The Munich Agreement badly split the Socialists into a pacifistic antiwar group that supported the agreement vs. an antifascist group that was opposed, and Blum struggled to find a compromise that would avoid splitting the Socialists. The debate was also made more difficult as Blum faced accusations that because he was a Jew that he wanted a war with Germany for the sake of German Jews instead of French national interests, which explained Blum's reluctance to be appear to be too anti-German and pro-war. During the vote on the Munich Agreement in the Chambre des députés on 4 October 1938, Blum voted for the Munich Agreement. During the debate on the Munich Agreement, Blum declared: "This deeply felt and impassioned will for peace cannot lead a people to accept everything; on the contrary, it strengthens the resolve to struggle, to sacrifice itself, if necessary for independence and freedom, it does not abolish the distinction what is just and unjust". Blum's contorted position of voting for the Munich Agreement, but being opposed to further appeasement was largely an attempt to hold together the Socialists. In the months that followed, Blum became more critical of the "men of Munich". The principal object of his criticism was not Daladier-whom he knew to be a reluctant appeaser-but rather the foreign minister, Georges Bonnet. Bonnet was known to be the advocate of some sort of Franco-German understanding under which France would recognize Eastern Europe as being in the German sphere of influence and abandon all of France's allies in Eastern Europe. Blum focused his criticism on Bonnet as the main advocate of appeasement in the cabinet.

In an attempt to improve productivity in the French armament industry, especially its aviation industry, Finance Minister Paul Reynaud, supported by Daladier, brought in a series of sweeping laws that undid much of the Popular Front's economic policies, most notably ending the 48 hour work week. Blum joined forces with the Communists in opposing the Daladier government's economic policies, and supported the general strike called by the Communists on 30 November 1938. Daladier called out the French Army to operate essential services and had the French police use tear gas to evict striking workers at the Renault works. The use of the military to operate essential services while sending out the police to arrest the strike leaders broke the general strike. In a speech, Blum accused Daladier of using repressive methods to crush the French working class and revert France back to the pre-1936 economic system. Complicating matters was the beginning of an acute crisis in Italo-French relations. On 30 November 1938-the same day as the general strike-a carefully staged "spontaneous" demonstration organized by the Italian Foreign Minister Count Galeazzo Ciano took place in the Italian Chamber of Deputies where on cue all of the deputies rose up to shout "Tunis, Corsica, Nice, Savoy!" Benito Mussolini had intended to use what he called "Sudeten methods" on France as the Italian media started a violent anti-French campaign demanding that France cede Corsica, Nice, Savoy and Tunisia to Italy. Daladier responded with a series of resolute speeches on French radio where he rejected all of the Italian demands, which won him much popularity in France. From the viewpoint of Blum, being opposed to Daladier at a time when he won himself many accolades as the defender of France's territorial integrity against Italy was politically difficult. At the next session of the Chambre des députés on 9 December 1938, the Popular Front formally came to an end as Daladier chose to base his majority of the parties of the right and center. Despite the end of the Popular Front, Blum did not press for a vote of no-confidence or new elections. Blum believed that Daladier would win an election if one was called, and the Socialists did not vote for a Communist motion of no-confidence in the Daladier government.

At a Socialist Party congress in Montrouge in December 1938, Blum called upon his party to abandon pacifism and support French rearmament. Blum argued that the idea championed by his mentor Jaurès of general strikes in all European nations to stop a war was no longer possible as the trade unions and the Social Democratic Party in Germany had been long since banned, and there was no possibility of a general strike in the Reich to stop a war. In a speech delivered on 27 December 1938, Blum accused the governments of Germany, Italy and Japan of being committed to policies of ultra-aggressive imperialism and argued that the way to stop another world war was rearmament and an alliance of all the states threatened by the Axis powers. Blum stated that he did not want a war, but he favored rearmament to avoid the "atrocious choice between submission and war". On 28 December, the congress ended with 4,332 Socialist delegates voting for Blum's call for rearmament vs. 2,837 votes for Paul Faure's pacifist motion opposing rearmament and another 1,014 delegates who chose to abstain. Through Blum had triumphed at the Montrouge congress, the results of the vote showed a significant element of the Socialist Party opposed to or at least lukewarm about rearmament. On 10 February 1939, Blum met with the Soviet ambassador in Paris, Jakob Suritz, where he told him of his belief that Daladier and Bonnet were leading France "to a new Sedan". Suritz described Blum as morose and disconsolate as he noted that Blum seemed convinced that France was heading towards a catastrophe without being willing to do anything to stop it.

== Danzig crisis ==
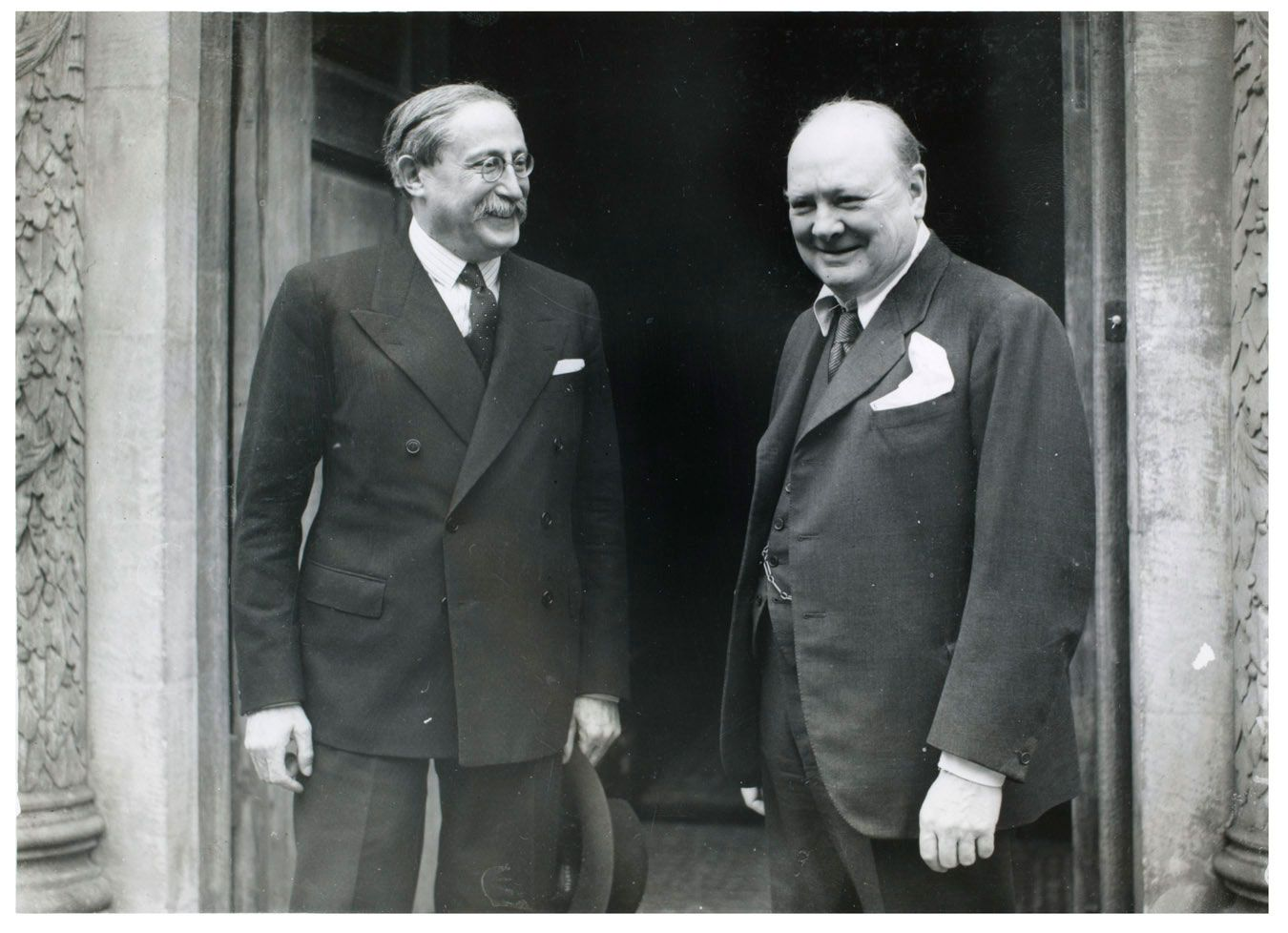
Blum and Winston Churchill, May 1939

During the Danzig crisis of 1939, Blum supported the measures taken by Britain and France to "contain" Germany and deter the Reich from invading Poland. The Danzig crisis forced Blum into the ambivalent position of supporting the foreign policy of the Daladier government while opposing its economic and social policies. Blum spoke in favor of greater military spending as he noted in an editorial in Le Populaire on 1 April 1939: "This is the state which the dictators have led Europe. For us Socialists, for us pacifists, the appeal to force is today the appeal for peace". When U.S. President Franklin D. Roosevelt issued a public letter to Hitler on 14 April 1939, asking him to promise to not threaten his neighbors, Blum expressed hope that this might be a solution for the crisis. However, in a brutal speech to the Reichstag on 28 April 1939, Hitler publicly mocked Roosevelt's appeal. Blum's support for Roosevelt's letter was the only time in the crisis that he expressed support for a measure of reconciliation with Germany.

During the crisis, Blum was greatly alarmed at the attitude of the British Labour Party, which were stoutly opposed to peacetime conscription, The Labour Party were planning to make the prospect of peacetime conscription into an election issue (a general election was expected in Britain in 1939 or 1940), which the Chamberlain government gave as the major reason for opposing peacetime conscription. Blum wrote to several Labour leaders as one Socialist to another, urging that Labour support peacetime conscription as necessary to resist Germany. Blum argued that France needed the "continental commitment" from Britain (i.e. send a large expeditionary force to France), which in turn required peacetime conscription as the current system of an all-volunteer army would never suffice for the "continental commitment". Blum stated in a public letter to the Labour Party in Le Populaire on 27 April 1939 that he did not like the Chamberlain government, but on the issue of peacetime conscription: "I do not hesitate to state to my Labour comrades my deepest conviction that at very moment at which I write, conscription in England is one of the capital acts upon which the peace of the world depends". Blum visited London to lobby the Labour leaders to support peacetime conscription, and met Chamberlain during the same visit. In a speech in the House of Commons on 11 May 1939, Chamberlain stated: "I had the opportunity yesterday of exchanging a few words with M. Blum, the French Socialist leader and former Prime Minister, and he said to me that in his view, and in the view of all the Socialist friends he had talked to, that there was only one danger of war in Europe, and that was a real one: It was that the impression should get about that Great Britain and France were not in earnest, and that they could not be relied upon to carry out their promises. If that there were so, no greater, no more deadly mistake could be made-and if it would be a frightful thing if Europe were to be plunged into war on the account of a misunderstanding. In many minds, the danger spot today is Danzig...if an attempt were made to change the situation by force in such a way as to threaten Polish independence, they would inevitably start a general conflagration in which this country would be involved." Upon his return to Paris, Blum gave a speech in the Chambre des députés that called upon France to stand by its alliance with Poland and in an implicit criticism of Bonnet called upon France "to fulfill without equivocation and without fail its pledges of mutual assurance and guarantee".

Blum supported the plans for a "peace front" to unite Britain, France and the Soviet Union with the aim of deterring Germany from invading Poland. Knowing that the major issue that was blocking the "peace front" talks was the demand by Soviet Foreign Commissar Vyacheslav Molotov for the Red Army to have transit rights into Poland in the event of a German invasion, which Polish Foreign Minister Colonel Józef Beck was utterly opposed to granting, Blum expressed much anger in his editorials as he wrote in an editorial on 25 June 1939 there was "not a day, not an hour to lose" as he urged Beck to concede on the transit rights issue. On 22 August 1939, Blum expressed hope in an editorial in Le Populaire that the "clouds of pessimism" would soon disappear as he asserted that the "peace front" would soon be in existence, which would in turn would deter the Reich from invading Poland. The next day, German Foreign Minister Joachim von Ribbentrop arrived in Moscow to sign the Molotov–Ribbentrop pact. On 24 August 1939, Blum wrote in an editorial that the Molotov–Ribbentrop pact was "a truly extraordinary event, almost incredible, one is dumbfounded by the blow". In his editorial, Blum strongly condemned Joseph Stalin for the Molotov–Ribbentrop pact as he wrote: "One would hardly be able to demonstrate greater audacity, scorn for world opinion and defiance of public morality". Blum wrote that his reaction to the famous photograph of Ribbentrop and Molotov signing the pact in the Kremlin while being watched by a smiling Stalin that: "I would try in vain to conceal my stupefaction". Blum used the Molotov–Ribbentrop pact to try to have French Communists to break with the Comintern as he urged the Communists to "become free men again" by ceasing to follow the orders of Moscow. Though Blum did not seriously expect the French Communists to break with Moscow, he did have hopes of winning the Communist voters over to the Socialists, whom he presented as the patriotic party committed to both socialism and France's interests.

== Second World War ==
On 1 September 1939, Germany invaded Poland. On 2 September 1939, Blum voted in the Chambre des députés for war credits to the government and urged the government to stand by its alliance with Poland. Daladier declared war on Germany on 3 September 1939. In an editorial in Le Populaire on 3 September 1939, Blum wrote: "Never was the violence more flagrant on one hand, and never was the will for peace more certain and more tenacious on the other". Poland was quickly defeated, and eight months of Phoney War followed, with little or no military movement in Western Europe. Blum argued that the existing cabinet was too awkward and urged France to copy the British example of an elite "war cabinet" that consisted of the key ministers. In the fall of 1939, Blum met with the Finance Minister Paul Reynaud and his protégé, Colonel Charles de Gaulle, to criticize Daladier's conduct of the war. Despite his support for the war, Blum criticized Daladier for banning the French Communist Party after the party declared its opposition to the war. During the Winter War, Blum praised Finland for its "sublime resistance" to the Soviet Union. Blum called the Soviet aggression against Finland a "crime" and accused Stalin of being an imperialist disguised as a Communist and stated that Stalin was the heir of Peter the Great, not Vladimir Lenin. In February 1940, the American Undersecretary of State, Sumner Welles, visited Paris as part of a peace mission on behalf of President Roosevelt. Blum met with Welles to tell him that he was wasting his time as no peace on reasonable terms was possible with Hitler. The defeat of Finland led to the fall of Daladier who had promised French aid to the Finns. Blum declared his support for the new Reynaud government, which promised to prosecute the war more vigorously.

On 10 May 1940, the Wehrmacht launched the Manstein variant of Fall Gelb ("Case Yellow") and invaded France via Belgium to by-pass the Maginot line. Blum noted bitterly that Nazi Germany no more respected Belgian neutrality in 1940 than the German Empire had done in 1914, and Belgium's neutral status allowed the Wehrmacht a head start in the invasion. The same day saw the fall of the Chamberlain government with Winston Churchill forming a new coalition government in London. Blum, in an editorial in Le Populaire, hailed the new Churchill government as a positive step. Blum had been invited before Fall Gelb to attend a Labour Party congress, and was especially keen to go as several of the Labour leaders were now cabinet ministers. Before leaving France, Reynaud met with Blum to tell him that the Wehrmacht was pressing very hard on the front on the Meuse river as Reynauld told him: "It is on the Meuse that we must at this moment with all our strength together defend our common safety". On 13–14 May 1940, Blum was in Bournemouth to attend the Labour Party congress. At the Bournemouth congress, Blum was cheered as a great socialist. As Blum spoke no English, he gave a short speech in French where he declared: "The war we are waging against Germany is not a capitalist war. I do not know what would become of capitalism if Hitler were to win the war, but I do know what would become of socialism if Germany were victorious. Wherever the motorized Attila has passed, every movement and institution created by the workers has been destroyed". On 15 May, Labour leader Clement Attlee did his best to tell Blum in his broken French that the Wehrmacht had won the Second Battle of Sedan and smashed its way through the French lines along the Meuse river, which came as a considerable shock once Blum finally understood what Attlee was trying to say.

Blum returned to Paris at once, and met Reynaud who told him that he was bringing in Marshal Philippe Pétain into his cabinet to reassure French public opinion. Blum did not see the appointment of Pétain-whom he called "the most noblest, the most human of our military chiefs"-as a problem. Pétain, the victor of the Battle of Verdun in 1916 was a beloved and deeply respected figure in France where he was seen as the greatest living French war hero and Reynaud saw Pétain in his cabinet as way to reassure the public. Blum later wrote that he had been in "illusion" about Pétain who immediately became the loudest voice of defeatism in the cabinet. Likewise, he did not oppose the appointment of Marshal Maxime Weygand as the new commander-in-chief to replace Maurice Gamelin, which he came to regret. Blum stated that he felt that Reynaud was correct to sack Gamelin-a soldier known for his loyalty to the republic-as he felt that Gemalin had lost control of the situation and that he hoped Weygand would restore France's fortunes. He was later to say that had he been aware that Weygand's loyalty to the republic was questionable, he would have been opposed to his appointment. Blum stated that in May 1940 that he lived "between the cruelest anguish and the most ardent hopes". Blum harbored hopes that just as in 1914 when Germany was initially victorious, but defeated in the Battle of the Marne that the French and the British would rally to stop the Wehrmacht before it was too late. Instead of heading for Paris as expected, the Wehrmacht headed towards the sea as part of a giant encirclement as Gamelin had sent the best divisions of the French Army along with the British Expeditionary Force (BEF) into Belgium to resist what he believed to be the main German blow. On 21 May 1940, the Wehrmacht reached the sea, cutting off the BEF, the elite of the French armies and what was left of the Belgian army. Blum used Le Populaire to argue that the Allies should break out of the encirclement to link up with the rest of the French armies, but the attempts to do so were unsuccessful. The BEF evacuated from Dunkirk, taking many French soldiers along. After the Dunkirk evacuation which ended with the fall of Dunkirk on 4 June, the Wehrmacht turned south towards Paris. When the government left Paris for Bordeaux on 10 June, Blum was not informed and found himself unable to speak to a person in authority. Blum met with the American ambassador, William Christian Bullitt Jr., and approved of his decision to remain in Paris. In retrospect, Blum stated that it was a mistake for the very popular Bullitt-who had much influence with the French cabinet-to remain in Paris as Bullitt could have used his influence to booster Reynaud against Pétain. Blum left Paris and made his way past vast columns of refugees to Bordeaux. On 14 June, the Wehrmacht took Paris.

In Bordeaux, Reynaud favored having the government relocate to Algiers (Algeria was considered an integral part of France) to continue the war while Pétain demanded an armistice. The Interior Minister, Georges Mandel, asked Blum to use his influence to persuade several wavering Socialist ministers to back the Algeria option. On 16 June, Reynaud was ousted as the majority of the cabinet rejected the Algeria option and Pétain formed the new government with a mandate to ask for an armistice. Blum allowed two Socialists to join Pétain's cabinet. Pétain's first act as premier was to ask for an armistice; Blum did not attach much importance to Pétain's request as he believed that Hitler would ask for armistice terms so harsh that Pétain would reject them and the government would relocate to Algiers. The notion that Pétain might actually accept Hitler's armistice terms did not occur to Blum at the time. Blum was so convinced that the government was going to Algiers that on 19 June 1940 he booked a passage on the ship SS Massilia that was to take the members of Assemblée nationale to Algiers. Blum missed the Massilia owing to confusion about where the Massilia was leaving as he had been told that the port of departure was Perpignan, which was changed at the last moment to Bordeaux. Just after the Massilia set sail for Algiers, Blum learned that the government was not going to Algiers after all and that Pétain had decided to sign an armistice. Blum was told by the police to leave Bordeaux for his own safety as right-wing extremists were parading though the streets and denouncing those they deemed responsible for declaration of war on Germany, causing him to go to Toulouse, where he stayed with Vincent Auriol. The Pétain government signed an armistice that gave Germany full control over much of France, with a rump Vichy government in control of the remainder as well as of the French colonial empire and the French Navy. Blum was in Toulouse when he read the news of the armistice in the Dépêche de Toulouse on 22 June, which he remembered as one of the blackest days of his life as he recalled: "I read, literally, without believing my eyes". Blum thought that the armistice was especially "abominable" because it required the French police to round up and return to the Reich all anti-Nazi German and Austrian exiles living in France, which he noted violated the traditional French custom of asylum. One of Blum's friends, Rudolf Hilferding, a prominent Jewish Social Democratic leader who had fled to France in 1933 was under the terms of the armistice arrested by the French police and returned to German custody, where he was beaten to death.

Blum spent the next ten days with Auriol and his family, where he refused their counsel to leave France. The Vice Premier in Pétain's cabinet, Pierre Laval called for the Assemblée nationale to meet in the new temporary capital of Vichy (Bordeaux had been assigned to the German occupation zone) to vote to give Pétain dictatorial powers. The task of lobbying the politicians was considered to be too vulgar by Pétain who assigned that mission to Laval. Blum arrived in Vichy on the afternoon of 4 July 1940. At the Petit Casino, which served as the meeting place for the "informational sessions" held by Laval, Blum later that day engaged in a vigorous debate with Laval who argued that the "mad, criminal war" proved that the constitutional changes he was championing were necessary. In response, Blum stated that it was "France that wanted the war" in September 1939 as he noted the majority of the cabinet had decided to honor the alliance with Poland. During the same "informational session", Laval told Blum that Le Populaire was banned as a threat to public order. Blum noted that he had known Laval since 1915, but on that day in 1940 he had seen him as never before as Laval was "bloated with incredible pride...handing out orders without appeal...visibly trying himself out in the role of a despot". On 8 July 1940, Blum called for a meeting of all the Socialist deputies and senators to discuss how to resist Laval's constitutional changes. Blum noted that to change the constitution required both houses of the Assemblée nationale to meet together, which led him to decide that the Socialist deputies and senators should vote against a joint session of the Assemblée nationale. Much to Blum's surprise, a number of Socialist deputies and senators rejected his plan and agreed for a joint session of the Assemblée nationale as they argued that the Socialists should instead ask for a referendum on any constitutional changes.

During the joint session of the Assemblée nationale held on 9–10 July in the Grand Casino to debate the request for constitutional revision, Blum found himself deserted by much of his caucus as many Socialist deputies and senators were bribed by Laval to vote for the constitutional changes. Blum was horrified by the extent of the corruption of much of the Socialist caucus who proved all too willing to vote to end French democracy if the bribe was large enough. Other Socialist deputies and senators were terrified by submission by the thugs from Jacques Doriot's Parti populaire français who were marching outside of the Grand Casino and threatening to lynch any deputies or senators who voted against Pétain. Marshal Maxime Weygand appeared at the session to talk menacing about the need for order in France and warned that he would call out the military if the Assemblée nationale did not vote as Marshal Pétain wanted. Laval in his speech used the British attack on the French fleet at Mers-el-Kébir on 3 July 1940 to argue that to vote against Pétain was unpatriotic and that Britain was the real enemy of France. Auriol called the Socialists who voted for the constitutional changes "this exhibition of miserable humanity" while saying that Blum was: "too sensitive not to suffer from it. He protects himself against it. He smiles".

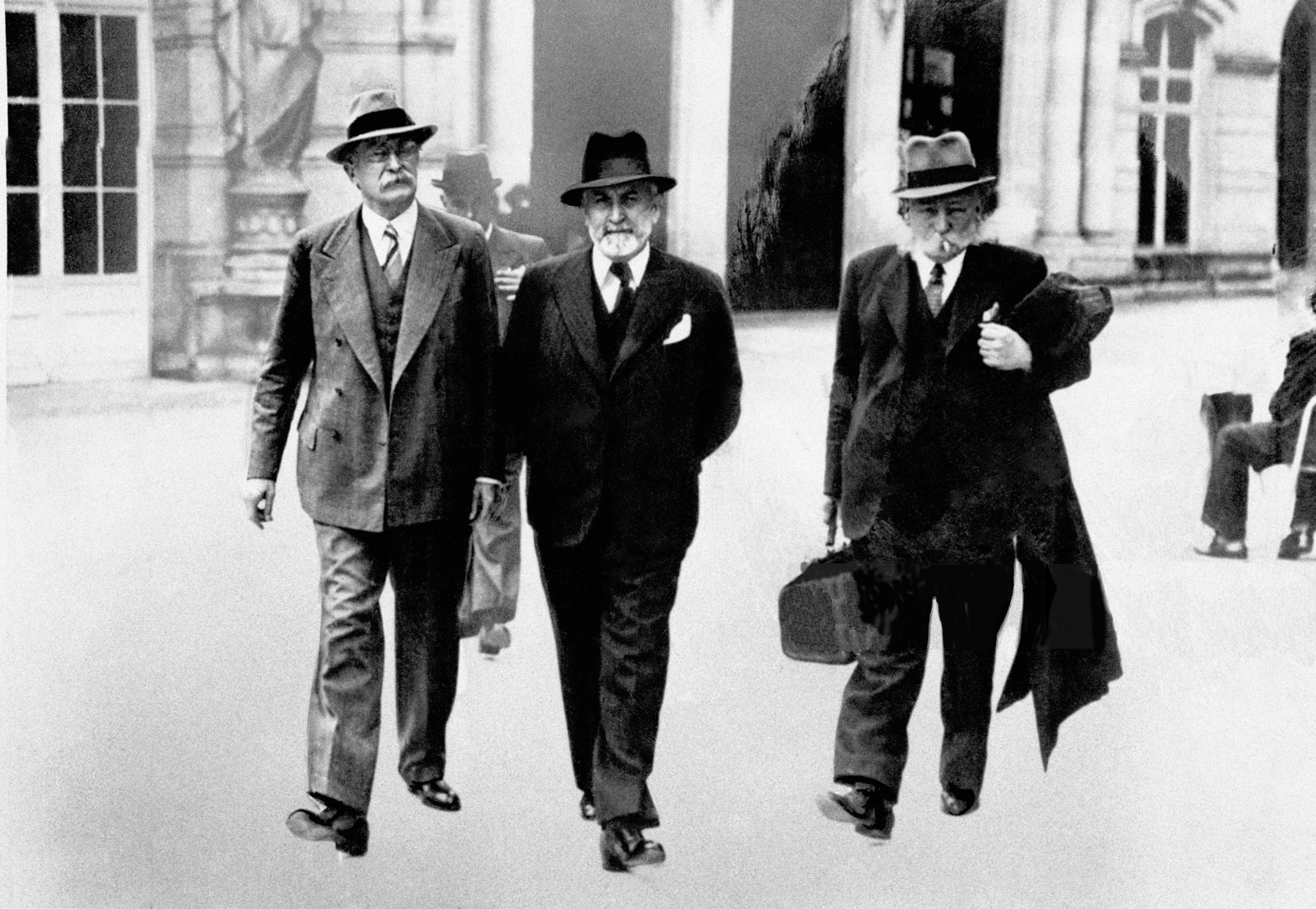
Blum and Marx Dormoy leaving the Opéra de Vichy after the National Assembly voted to give full power to Pétain, 10 July 1940

In his keynote speech on 9 July, Laval claimed that the Front populaire had weakened France to such an extent that it caused the defeat of 1940 while Blum had sabotaged Laval's policy of friendship with Italy, which he claimed caused the war. Afterwards, all eyes were turned to Blum who chose to not give a rebuttal speech. By this point, Blum was too broken by what he had seen that day, especially the corruption of his caucus, to speak in his defense as he later noted that he saw the republic and all that it stood for crumble. Blum found himself very much alone during the joint session as the leading politicians who would have normally spoken in favor of democracy were all absent. Paul Reynaud had been seriously injured in an automobile accident that killed his mistress; Édouard Daladier, Georges Mandel, Yvon Delbos, Jean Zay and César Campinchi had all left France on the Massilia and had not been permitted to return; and the courage of Édouard Herriot failed him as he limited himself to defending the patriotism of those left abroad the Massilia. When the final vote was held on 10 July, Blum voted against the request for constitutional revision. Blum was among "The Vichy 80", a minority of parliamentarians that refused to grant full powers to Marshal Pétain. The final result of the vote were 569 deputies and senators for constitutional revision, 80 against and 17 abstained. Of the 56 Socialist deputies and senators who had promised Blum on 8 July to vote against constitutional revision, only 35 (28 Deputies and 7 Senators) actually kept their promise on 10 July. The same Parliament that had sponsored the Popular Front program since 1936 remained in power; it voted overwhelmingly to make Marshal Philippe Pétain a dictator and reverse all of the gains of the French Third Republic.

== Prisoner ==
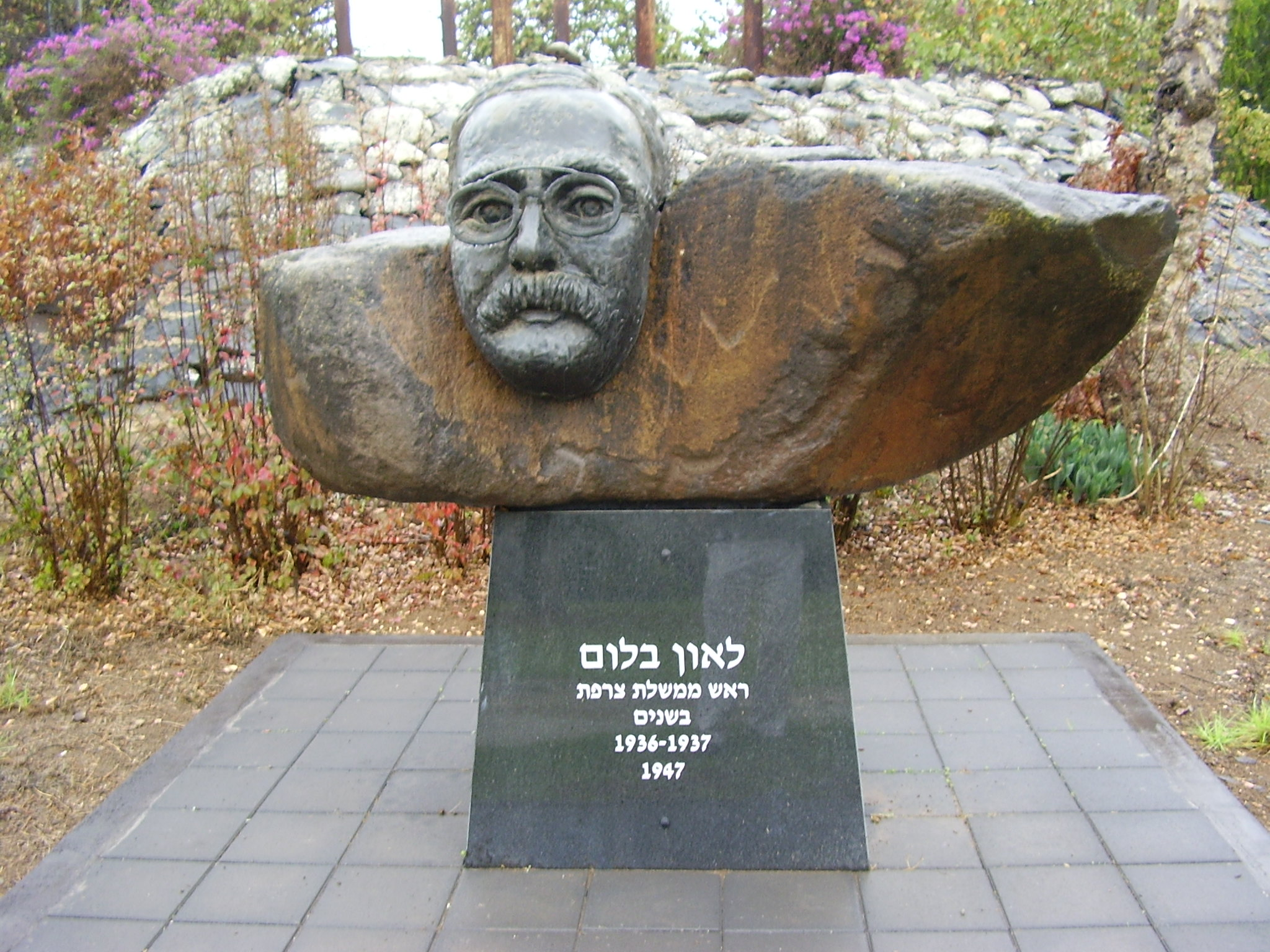
Léon Blum memorial in kibbutz Kfar Blum, Israel

Afterwards, Blum returned to a farm outside of Toulouse, where he wrote and listened to the BBC's French language broadcasts for news on the war. In July 1940, Blum ordered a young Socialist politician, Daniel Mayer, not to go to London to join de Gaulle's Free French movement, but to go to the unoccupied zone in the south of France to organize a resistance group. On 15 September 1940, he was arrested by the French police on charges of high treason. Despite being unarmed, Blum's arrest was treated as a major police operation with dozens of police automobiles parked around the farm while likewise dozens of armed policeman stormed the farmhouse. The excessive police force to arrest Blum was intended to symbolize his status as a man who was "dangerous" to France. Blum was held for the first two months of his imprisonment in the tower of the Château de Chazeron, where his cellmates were Daladier, Reynaud, Mandel and Gamelin. He later wrote that his imprisonment at the Château de Chazeron was at least tolerable as he spent his days writing his memoirs and admiring the Renaissance gardens from his window. Blum began his memoirs with a stark admission of failure as he observed that his generation who came of age in the 1890s had failed to achieve any of their dreams and hopes that they had held as young men and women. In his memoirs, Blum blamed the French bourgeoisie for the defeat of 1940 as he claimed that the bourgeoisie were selfish, petty people concerned with materialism and their self-interest, which had "rotted out" France. On 8 October 1940, Blum was formally charged with treason. In November 1940, Blum was sent to a run-down estate at Bourassol to be closer to the judicial proceedings at Riom. Unlike the comfortable Château de Chazeron the Bourassol estate was unheated, had no electricity and no running water, which as intended made for a more uncomfortable imprisonment.

On 9 April 1941, Blum received over a hundred birthday telegrams from distinguished Americans, the most notable of whom was the First Lady, Eleanor Roosevelt, which greatly cheered him. In May 1941, Blum wrote a letter to the court asking when his trial would begin as he stated it would have been three months since his last interrogation, and he still had no word when his trial would begin. On 22 June 1941, Germany launched Operation Barbarossa, the invasion of the Soviet Union, and Blum's confidence began to rise when Germany failed to achieve the expected swift victory. Blum wrote in late 1941 of the Red Army: "Do you recall with what scorn they used to speak to us of that army? Only the Polish Army counted for something. As to a comparison with the French Army, no one would hazarded such an impious thought!" On 16 October 1941, Marshal Pétain in a radio address to the French nation announced that the Council of Political Justice (whose members were all appointed by him) had convicted Blum, Daladier, Reynaud, Mandel and Gamelin of violating article seven of the Constitutional Act and as such were all sentenced to life imprisonment in a military prison. Pétain also announced that Blum, Daladier and Gamelin would be tried before the Supreme Court at Riom. Blum formally protested that it was unjust to be convicted by a tribunal before which he had not been allowed to present a defense, and that he was now going to face trial for the offenses of which he had been convicted. On 22 November 1941, Blum was then imprisoned in Fort du Portalet in the Pyrenees. The German Ambassador to Vichy, Otto Abetz, wanted Blum to be charged with declaring war on Germany in 1939, a demand resisted by Pétain and his premier, Admiral Darlan, who could not bring themselves to admit to France's supposed "war guilt". Instead, Pétain and Darlan resolved to charge Blum with failure to prepare France for war, much to the disappointment of Abetz. The Fort du Portalet was a remote fortress built in 1838 only ten miles from the Spanish border and Blum's cell was cut off from the sunlight. Blum found the winter of 1941–1942 in his cell up in the Pyrenees to be immensely uncomfortable as his cell was always cold and the cell walls were always moist from the humidity. Through visits with his daughter-in-law, Renée Blum, and his mistress, Jeanne Adèle "Janot" Levylier, he was able to maintain contacts with Socialist resistance groups in both the occupied and unoccupied zones. Right from the start, Blum supported the Free French movement led by General de Gaulle.

Blum was put on trial starting on 19 February 1942 in the Riom Trial on charges of treason, for having "weakened France's defenses" by ordering her arsenal shipped to Spain, leaving France's infantry unsupported by heavy artillery on the eastern front against Nazi Germany. The trial was given much publicity and over 200 journalists, both French and from abroad, attended the trial. In contrast to his cell at Fort du Portalet, the courtroom in Riom was overheated, stuffy, ornate and lavish with Louis XIV armchairs provided for the judges, prosecutors, defense counsel and the accused. Sitting next to Blum were his co-accused, namely Daladier, Gamelin, Robert Jacomet and Guy La Chambre. Blum was visibly angry when at the beginning of the trial Gamelin rose in the courtroom to say that he would not participate in the trial and had chosen to say nothing in his own defense under the grounds he was only a soldier while the trial was concerned with political questions. Blum felt that Gamelin was acting in a selfish way as Gamelin was in effect saying that only the politicians were responsible for the defeat of 1940, which did not help Blum's case. He believed that Gamelin was hoping that Pétain might pardon him from the expected death sentence to be handed down by the Supreme Court. Blum in his opening address attacked the "legal monstrosity" of having already been convicted without a trial in 1941 for the same offenses that he was now on trial for in 1942 as he stated that the presumption of innocence had been disregarded in his case. He also charged it was unjust that the court's preview only covered official actions up to 3 September 1939 and thus excluded the actual campaign of 10 May-21 June 1940, which he noted excused the generals from any responsibility for France's defeat. Blum charged his trial was a simply an elaborate excuse by France's defeated generals who were looking for a scapegoat to blame for their incompetence. Blum bitterly noted that it was always the Jews who were everyone's preferred scapegoat. He also noted that court's purview for official actions started on 4 June 1936, the same day that he took office with the obvious implication that it was with his government that the neglect of France's defenses was alleged to have begun.

Blum's opening address made a notable impression on the courtroom as one journalist noted: "No matter how prejudiced they were—and especially against Léon Blum—the audience was moved by his initial passionate eloquence". He used the courtroom to make a "brilliant indictment" of the French military and pro-German politicians like Pierre Laval. Both Daladier and Blum proved to be highly combative defendants who gave no quarter in their debates with the prosecutors while on the stand. Blum and Daladier charged it was the governments before the Popular Front who had neglected France's defense and both emphasized that it was Marshal Pétain who had been minister of war for much of 1934 and Laval who had been premier in 1935–1936. Blum made much of the fact that his government had launched the largest peacetime defense programme in French history in September 1936, which he used to ridicule the claims of the prosecution that he had neglected the defense of France. The trial was such an embarrassment to the Vichy regime that the Germans ordered it called off, worried that Blum's expert performance would have major public consequences.

The trial, which received much media attention made Blum into a popular hero. An editorial in The New York Times praised him, declaring: "When M. Blum was Prime Minister of the French Republic, he may have made errors in judgment. What man in public life hasn't done that? At Riom he spoke for the clear-eyed heroic France that every free man on earth loves and respects". For Blum's 70th birthday on 9 April 1942, he received a birthday telegram signed by 200 prominent Americans with the first name on the list being once again the First Lady Eleanor Roosevelt. The United States maintained diplomatic relations with Vichy France until November 1942, and it was believed that Eleanor Roosevelt was serving as a surrogate for the president. The American ambassador to Vichy, Admiral William D. Leahy, was in contact with Blum, who asked him in a letter dated 30 April 1942 to use his influence with the president to secure his release. Blum was greatly worried about his brother, René Blum, who had been interned in the Drancy camp in December 1941. In September 1942, René Blum was deported to Auschwitz along with a thousand other French Jews, where they were all exterminated in the gas chambers upon arrival. Blum always stated that the death of his brother at Auschwitz was for him the greatest loss of the war. On 8 November 1942, the Germans violated the armistice of 21 June 1940 and occupied the unoccupied zone in the south of France, bringing all of France under the control of the Reich. Both Churchill and to even greater extent Roosevelt disliked and distrusted de Gaulle, leading to Blum to write a letter smuggled out of prison in November 1942 addressed to Churchill and Roosevelt that denounced the "deal with Darlan" that Anglo-American forces had made in Algeria. In his letter, Blum wrote that Darlan was a traitor and collaborator, and praised de Gaulle as the real leader of France. Blum wrote: "One serves democratic France by helping General de Gaulle to assume at once the position of a leader". In March 1943, via a letter smuggled out of prison by Renée Blum, he wrote to General de Gaulle to declare his support, saying as the leader of the Socialist Party "we have from the very first hour recognized you as chief in the present battle". Blum was transferred to German custody and imprisoned in Germany until 1945.

On 31 March 1943, the German Government had Blum imprisoned in Buchenwald. Without consulting Laval, a group of SS officers arrived at the Bourassol prison on the morning of 31 March to take away Gamelin, Blum, Raynaud, Mandel and Daladier who arrived at Buchenwald the next day. Blum complained of the "peculiar odor" of Buchenwald that reached him as the smell of burned human flesh was overwhelming. Blum described his hut at Buchenwald as "less a prison than a burial vault or grave". Though Mandel was a conservative, Blum often discussed the future of post-war France with him. As Resistance attacks intensified in France in the spring of 1944, Abetz wrote to Hitler that the executions of "certain French personalities who hold a real interest for the Jews, the Gaullists and the Communists" was the only way to stop the Resistance, a plan that Hitler approved of on 30 May 1944. Abetz suggested executing Mandel, Reynaud, Daladier, and Blum as the men "responsible for the war". Despite the best efforts at censorship, Blum learned of Operation Overlord as the Allies landed in Normandy on 6 June 1944, which gave him hope that France would soon be liberated. On 28 June 1944, the collaborationist journalist Philippe Henriot was assassinated in Paris, leading Abetz to order Blum, Reynaud, Daladier and Mandel to be returned to Paris to be shot. In a rare act of defiance, Laval wrote to Abetz asking him to spare the French leaders, and as such it was only Mandel who was taken back from Paris to be shot. Blum remembered that Mandel was taken away very suddenly from Buchenwald, and he never heard from him again.

As the war worsened for the Germans, they moved Blum into the section reserved for high-ranking prisoners, as a possible hostage for future surrender negotiations. His future wife, Jeanne Adèle "Janot" Levylier, came to the camp voluntarily to live with him in the camp, and they were married there. In February 1945, Blum wrote to the commandant of Buchenwald: "You are already conquerors in this sense: you have succeeded in communicating to the entire world your cruelty and hatred. At this very moment your resistance without hope appears only as the extreme mark of a sadistic ferocity...And we respond, waging the war like you, in exasperated rage; everywhere it takes on the face of Biblical extermination. I tremble at the thought that you are already conquerors in this sense; you have breathed such terror all about that to master you, to prevent the return of your fury, we shall see no other way of fashioning the world save in your image, your laws, the law of Force".

As the Allied armies approached Buchenwald, he was transferred to Dachau, near Munich. On 3 April 1945, Blum and his wife were placed into a convoy of cars that took them to Regensburg camp. Along the way, he saw prisoners on death marches that he noted were "even more lamentable and haggard" than at Buchenwald. On 12 April 1945, he was saddened by the news of the death of President Roosevelt, a leader he always greatly admired and whom he had hopes of meeting one day. Blum had learned from Bullitt about Roosevelt's secret, namely that he was paralyzed due to the polio he contracted on a trip to Canada in 1921, and he admired the way that Roosevelt had gone on to become president despite his paralysis. On a more practical level, Blum soon discovered that his SS guards were jubilant over the news of Roosevelt's death as everyone in Germany seemed to believe that the new American president, Harry S. Truman, would ally the United States with the Reich and declare war on the Soviet Union. The belief, however erroneous it was, that the new Truman administration was about to ally itself with Germany against the Soviet Union reduced the reasons for the Nazis to keep Blum alive as they believed that as a Jew he had certain connections with the Jewish groups that they believed ruled the Soviet Union.

On 17 April 1945, Blum and his wife arrived at Dachau, where Blum was shocked by the "living skeletons" that were the prisoners of Dachau. On 20 April 1945, the Red Army entered Berlin, which led Blum to hope that the war would soon be over, and fear that the SS would execute him before the war ended. On 26 April 1945, as the Americans approached Munich, the SS guards ordered the prisoners of Dachau to go on a death march. Blum at first thought that he was going to join the death march, but was instead sent south on a truck to Austria. In late April 1945, he was together with other notable inmates, sent to Tyrol. On 30 April 1945, Hitler committed suicide in the Fűhrerbunker under the Reich Chancellery in Berlin, which Blum noted seemed to disorient his SS guards. In the last weeks of the war the Nazi regime gave orders that he was to be executed, but the local authorities decided not to obey them. Blum was rescued by Allied troops in May 1945. While in prison he wrote his best-known work, the essay "On a human scale". His brother René, the founder of the Ballet de l'Opéra à Monte Carlo, was arrested in Paris in 1942. He was deported to Auschwitz, where, according to the Vrba-Wetzler report, he was tortured and killed in September 1942.

== Post-war period ==
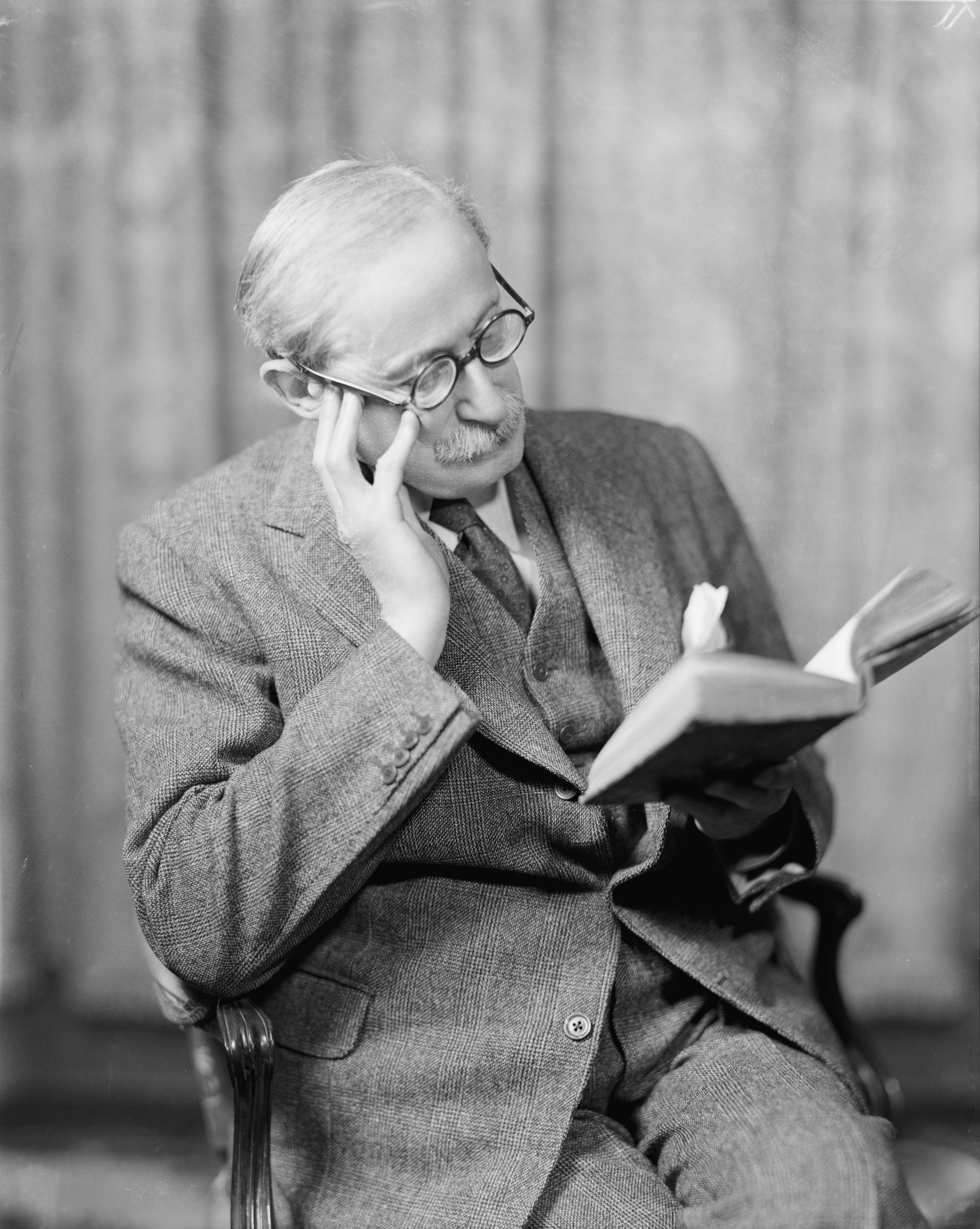
Léon Blum, before 1945

After the war, Léon Blum returned to politics, and was again briefly prime minister in the transitional postwar coalition government. On 14 May 1945, Blum returned to Paris for the first time since 1940. The British Foreign Secretary Anthony Eden who had known Blum during his time as premier recalled: "He came to see me in London, frail, but with all the natural dignity I had remembered, which no harsh treatment could impair". Blum praised de Gaulle who proclaimed himself to be the provisional president of France as "the only man who could unite around his name the pure, honest forces of liberated France", but expressed opposition to de Gaulle's plans for a new constitution with an executive presidency. Blum wanted a new constitution, but one that would abolish the Senate and give more power to the premier instead of the president as de Gaulle wanted. In several meetings, de Gaulle attempted to convince Blum to support his plans for a new constitution, but after failing to win him over, his relations with Blum went into a decline. On 22 September 1945, Blum received a letter from Laval who was on trial for his life, asking him to testify in his defense. Blum refused to testify for Laval, but he did write a letter in his defense saying that Laval had saved him from being executed in 1944 when Abetz was pressing for him to be shot. Blum testified for the prosecution at the trial of Pétain for treason, where Blum stated Pétain had been the voice of "military defeatism" in 1940, denounced the "corrupting bath of Vichy", and flatly stated that Pétain was guilty of "treason".

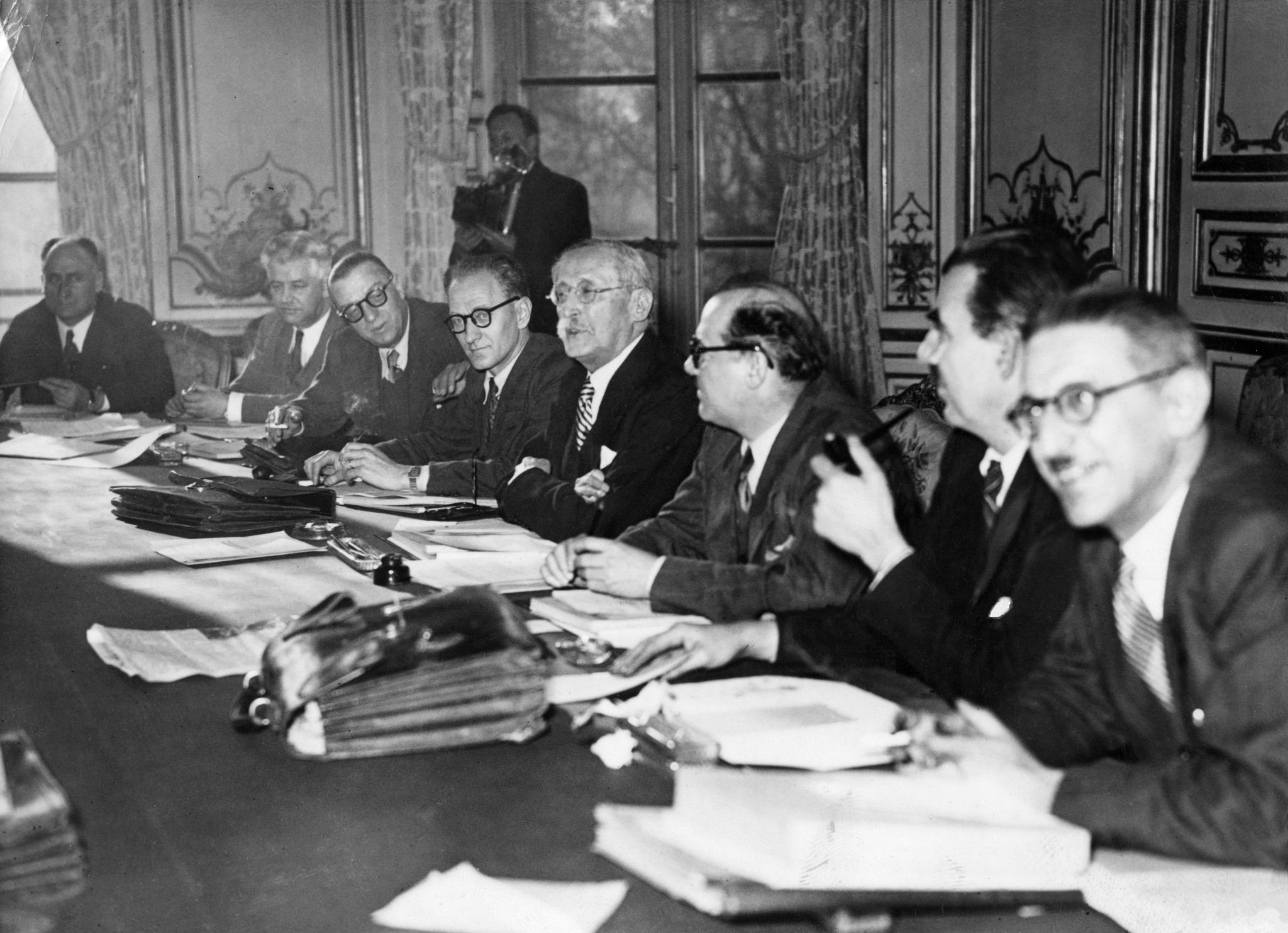
Blum and his third government, December 1946

He advocated an alliance between the center-left and the center-right parties in order to support the Fourth Republic against the Gaullists and the Communists. Blum also served as an ambassador on a government loan mission to the United States, and as head of the French mission to UNESCO. Blum paid a two-month visit to the United States in the spring of 1946 where along with the economist Jean Monnet he sought a loan for the reconstruction of war-devastated France. Blum was greeted at the White House by President Truman as an honoured guest, and Blum was a keynote speaker at a ceremony to honor the first anniversary of Roosevelt's death on 12 April 1946. On 28 May 1946, Blum signed the Blum–Byrnes agreement that cancelled much of the French war debts relating to Lend-Lease aid; arranged for the purchase of surplus American material at a discount and granted credits on easy terms to buy American industrial equipment to replace French industrial equipment lost in the war. Blum hailed the agreement he signed with the Secretary of State James F. Byrnes as an act of remarkable generosity on the part of the United States, which agreed to support the reconstruction of France without imposing controls on the French economy as the French Communists claimed that it would.

In the talks regarding the future of Vietnam, Blum reprinted a letter from Ho Chi Minh in Le Populaire calling for France to grant independence to Vietnam at once, and to recognize the government that Ho had proclaimed in August 1945. He favored the plans for the French Union, the French version of the Commonwealth under which the various colonies of France would be granted the equivalent of Dominion status. Blum praised the agreement for Vietnam to be independent within the French Union that was negotiated in 1946. On 19 December 1946, war broke out in Vietnam as fighting erupted in Hanoi and Haiphong between French forces and the Viet Minh and Blum vowed to put down the rebellion.

Blum supported the Marshall Plan for the reconstruction of Europe, and ordered the Socialist deputies and senators to vote for the plan in the National Assembly. In the emerging Cold War, he was a conditional supporter of the Western line as he stated in the states of Eastern Europe occupied by the Soviet Union that the new Communist regimes that were installed were not democracies, and that much of the break-down in relations between the victorious Allies was due to Stalin. However, Blum had hopes that the wartime alliance of the Allies would continue after the war, and felt that some of the policies of the Truman administration were too extreme. He always held to the hope that the wartime spirit of co-operation could be restored, and deplored the breakup of Europe into two blocs, one dominated by the Soviet Union and the other by the United States. Alfred Duff Cooper, the British ambassador in Paris, acting more or less on his own had been pressing for an Anglo-French alliance ever since he arrived in France. Seeing a chance with the Anglophile Blum in office, Duff Cooper arranged for him to go to London. Blum was more interested in British coal as the retreating Germans had destroyed most of France's coal mines in 1944–1945, causing many of the French to live in unheated homes in the wintertime, which Britain, which had its own coal shortages could not provide. As a result, the British offered up an alliance as a substitute for the coal that they could not provide. In 1947, Blum strongly supported the Treaty of Dunkirk, a military alliance with Great Britain, which Blum felt gave France what it sought in vain for most of the interwar period, a firm commitment from Britain to defend France. In January 1947, Blum visited London where he received the approval both Clement Attlee and his foreign secretary, Ernest Bevin for the treaty.

After the war, Blum became more supportive of Zionism. Prior to the Holocaust, Blum regarded the Dreyfus Affair as an aberration in French history, but after the Holocaust, he became less certain on this point, and several of Blum's post-1945 statements implied it was not entirely possible for Jews to be ever being fully accepted by Gentiles as equals. As a Socialist and an Anglophile, the Labour government's policy of enforcing the 1939 White Paper on restricting Jewish immigration to Palestine caused him much anguish. The fact that Ernest Bevin, a politician whom Blum otherwise liked and admired, was the Labour government's principal spokesman on Palestine, caused him much dismay. In 1947, he supported the voyage of the ship SS Exodus taking Jewish Holocaust survivors from France to Palestine that was stopped by the British, an action that Blum sharply condemned in an editorial in Le Populaire. Blum wrote: "The passengers abroad the Exodus are not terrorists. They are simply martyrs. They would die with arms in their hands, as heroes, like their fathers and brothers, mothers and sisters, in the Warsaw Ghetto...Pardon the unlucky heroes of the Exodus. The ship's passengers are not crates that longshoremen can pass from hand to hand, freight to be unloaded indiscriminately in this port or that depot. They are human beings, free individuals". However, Blum made it clear that he only supported settling Holocaust survivors in Palestine who had no other place to go, and felt that as a French Jew his homeland was France. Blum believed it was possible for the Palestinian Arabs to co-exist with the Jews, writing the "humble Arab peasant" in Palestine was being befriended by the "humble Jewish peasant". In 1948, Blum supported the establishment of Israel, writing in an editorial in Le Populaire on 15 May 1948 that he hoped Israel would be "a fatherland of dignity, equality and freedom for all Jews who had not had like myself the good fortune to find one in their native country". During the first Arab-Israeli war of 1948–1949, Blum took a strongly pro-Israeli line in his editorials.

Blum spoke in favor of a European federation as the best solution to the problems of Europe, saying in 1949 was needed was to "create Europe while thinking of the world". On 19 November 1949, he wrote in an editorial in Le Populaire that: "we must create Europe. We must do it with Germany and not for her. We must do it with Great Britain and not against her". Blum urged the French to forgive the Germans, saying he was opposed to any idea of German collective guilt for Nazism and "nothing fruitful, nothing lasting is built on hatred and enslavement". Much to his disappointment, neither Attlee nor Bevin were much interested in his plans for European unity. Although Blum's last government was very much an interim administration (lasting less than five weeks), it nevertheless succeeded in implementing a number of measures which helped to reduce the cost of living. Blum also served as Vice-Premier for one month in the summer of 1948 in the very short-lived government led by André Marie. He continued to write for Le Populaire until his death at Jouy-en-Josas, near Paris, on 30 March 1950. The kibbutz of Kfar Blum in northern Israel is named after him.

== Honors and awards ==
- Knight of the Order of Legion of Honour (1909)
- Resistance Medal (1947)

== Government ==
=== First ministry (4 June 1936 – 22 June 1937) ===
- Léon Blum – President of the Council
- Édouard Daladier – Vice President of the Council and Minister of National Defense and War
- Yvon Delbos – Minister of Foreign Affairs
- Roger Salengro – Minister of the Interior
- Vincent Auriol – Minister of Finance
- Charles Spinasse – Minister of National Economy
- Jean-Baptiste Lebas – Minister of Labour
- Marc Rucart – Minister of Justice
- Alphonse Gasnier-Duparc – Minister of Marine
- Pierre Cot – Minister of Air
- Jean Zay – Minister of National Education
- Albert Rivière – Minister of Pensions
- Georges Monnet – Minister of Agriculture
- Marius Moutet – Minister of Colonies
- Albert Bedouce – Minister of Public Works
- Henri Sellier – Minister of Public Health
- Robert Jardillier – Minister of Posts, Telegraphs, and Telephones
- Paul Bastid – Minister of Commerce
- Camille Chautemps – Minister of State
- Paul Faure – Minister of State
- Maurice Viollette – Minister of State
- Léo Lagrange – Under-Secretary of State for the Organization of leisure activities and sports - i.e. Minister of Sports

Changes:

- 18 November 1936 – Marx Dormoy succeeds Roger Salengro as Minister of the Interior, following Salengro's suicide.

=== Second ministry (13 March – 10 April 1938) ===
- Léon Blum – President of the Council and Minister of Treasury
- Édouard Daladier – Vice President of the Council and Minister of National Defense and War
- Joseph Paul-Boncour – Minister of Foreign Affairs
- Marx Dormoy – Minister of the Interior
- Charles Spinasse – Minister of Budget
- Albert Sérol – Minister of Labour
- Marc Rucart – Minister of Justice
- César Campinchi – Minister of Military Marine
- Guy La Chambre – Minister of Air
- Jean Zay – Minister of National Education
- Albert Rivière – Minister of Pensions
- Georges Monnet – Minister of Agriculture
- Marius Moutet – Minister of Colonies
- Jules Moch – Minister of Public Works
- Fernand Gentin – Minister of Public Health
- Jean-Baptiste Lebas – Minister of Posts, Telegraphs, and Telephones
- Ludovic-Oscar Frossard – Minister of Propaganda
- Vincent Auriol – Minister of Coordination of Services of the Presidency of the Council
- Pierre Cot – Minister of Commerce
- Paul Faure – Minister of State
- Théodore Steeg – Minister of State
- Maurice Viollette – Minister of State
- Albert Sarraut – Minister of State in charge of North African Affairs
- Léo Lagrange – Under-Secretary of State for Sports, Leisure Activities and Physical Education

=== Third ministry (16 December 1946 – 22 January 1947) ===
- Léon Blum – President of the Provisional Government and Minister of Foreign Affairs
- André Le Troquer – Minister of National Defense
- Édouard Depreux – Minister of the Interior
- André Philip – Minister of Familial Economy and Finance
- Robert Lacoste – Minister of Industrial Production
- Daniel Mayer – Minister of Labour and Social Security
- Paul Ramadier – Minister of Justice
- Yves Tanguy – Minister of Public Utilities
- Marcel Edmond Naegelen – Minister of National Education
- Max Lejeune – Minister of Veterans and War Victims
- François Tanguy-Prigent – Minister of Agriculture
- Marius Moutet – Minister of Overseas France
- Jules Moch – Minister of Public Works, Transport, Reconstruction, and Town Planning
- Pierre Ségelle – Minister of Public Health and Population
- Eugène Thomas – Minister of Posts
- Félix Gouin – Minister of Planning
- Guy Mollet – Minister of State
- Augustin Laurent – Minister of State

Changes:

- 23 December 1946 – Augustin Laurent succeeds Moutet as Minister of Overseas France.

== Bibliography ==
- Nouvelles conversations de Goethe avec Eckermann, Éditions de la Revue blanche, 1901.
- Du mariage, Paul Ollendorff, 1907; English translation, Marriage, J. B. Lippincott Company, 1937.
- Stendhal et le beylisme, Paul Ollendorff, 1914.
- Pour être socialiste, Libraire Populaire, 1920.
- Bolchévisme et socialisme, Librairie populaire, 1927.
- Souvenirs sur l'Affaire, Gallimard, 1935.
- La Réforme gouvernementale, Bernard Grasset, 1936.
- À l'échelle humaine, Gallimard, 1945; English translation, For All Mankind, Victor Gollancz, 1946 (Left Book Club).
- L'Histoire jugera, Éditions de l'Arbre, 1943.
- Le Dernier mois, Diderot, 1946.
- Révolution socialiste ou révolution directoriale, J. Lefeuvre, 1947.
- Discours politiques, Imprimerie Nationale, 1997.

== Sources ==
- Adamthwaite, Anthony (1977). France and the Coming of the Second World War, 1936-1939. London: Taylor & Francis. ISBN 9781000352788.
- Barbieri, Pierpaolo (2015). Hitler's Shadow Empire: Nazi Economics and the Spanish Civil War. Cambridge: Harvard University Press. ISBN 9780674426252.
- Birnbaum, Pierre (2015). Léon Blum: Prime Minister, Socialist, Zionist. Yale UP. p. 74. ISBN 9780300213737.
- Cameron, Elizabeth (1953). "Alexis Saint-Léger-Léger". In Gordon A. Craig & Felix Gilbert (ed.). The Diplomats 1919-1939. Princeton: Princeton University Press. pp. 378–405.
- Carley, Michael Jabara (1999). 1939: The Alliance That Never Was and the Coming of World War II. Chicago: Ivan R. Dee. ISBN 9781461699385.
- Colton, Joel (1966). Leon Blum: Humanist in Politics. Knopf Doubleday Publishing Group. ISBN 978-0-307-83089-0. LCCN 65-18768. OCLC 265833.
- Crozier, Andrew J. (1988). Appeasement And Germany's Last Bid For Colonies. London: Macmillan. ISBN 9781349192557.
- Ford, Franklin; Schorske, Carl (1953). "The Voice in the Wilderness: Robert Coulondre". In Gordon A. Craig; Felix Gilbert (eds.). The Diplomats 1919-1939. Princeton: Princeton University Press. pp. 555–578.
- Greenwood, Sean (2002). "The Most Important of the Western Nations: France's Place in Britain's Post-War foreign policy, 1945-1949". In Alan Sharp & Glyn Stone (ed.). Anglo-French Relations in the Twentieth Century Rivalry and Cooperation. London: Taylor & Francis. pp. 244–265. ISBN 9781134690732.
- Judt, Tony (1998). The Burden of Responsibility: Blum, Camus, Aron, and the French Twentieth Century. Chicago: University of Chicago Press. ISBN 9780226414195.
- Kaufmann, William (1953). "Two American Ambassadors: Bullitt and Kennedy". In Gordan A. Craig & Felix Gilbert (ed.). The Diplomats, 1919–1939. Princeton: Princeton University Press. pp. 649–681.
- Keylor, William (1997). "France and the Illusion of American Support 1919-1940". In Joel Blatt (ed.). The French Defeat of 1940 Reassessments. Providence, Rhode Island: Berghahn Books. pp. 204–244.
- Leutner, Mechtild (2020). "Chinese Visas for European Refugees, Marseille, 1940/1941: An (Almost) Forgotten Example of International Solidarity". In Nele Noesselt (ed.). China's New Silk Road Dreams. Berlin: Lit Verlag. pp. 144–161. ISBN 978-3-643-91349-4.
- Maiolo, Joseph (2010). Cry Havoc: How the Arms Race Drove the World to War, 1931-1941. New York: Basic Books. ISBN 9780465022670.
- Moradiellos, Enrique (2011). "The International Dimensions of the Spanish Civil War". In Frank McDonough (ed.). Origins of the Second World War: An International Perspective. London: Continuum. pp. 311–326.
- Salerno, Reynolds M. (February 1997). "The French Navy and the Appeasement of Italy, 1937-9". English Historical Review. 112 (445): 66–104. doi:10.1093/ehr/CXII.445.66.
- Sullivan, Barry (1999). "More Than Meets the Eye: The Ethiopian War and the Origins of the Second World War"". In Gordon Martel (ed.). The Origins of the Second World War Reconsidered: A.J.P. Taylor and the Historians. London: Routledge. pp. 178–203.
- Watt, Donald Cameron (1989). How War Came: The Immediate Origins of the Second World War, 1938-1939. London: Heinemann. ISBN 0-434-84216-8. OCLC 19269229.
- Weinberg, Gerhard (1980). The Foreign Policy of Hitler's Germany, Volume 2: Starting World War Two, 1937-1939. Chicago: University of Chicago Press.
- Young, Robert (2005). An Uncertain Idea of France. New York: Peter Lang. ISBN 0-8204-7481-9.

Political offices
Preceded by Albert Sarraut	Prime Minister of France; 1936–1937	Succeeded by Camille Chautemps
Preceded by Camille Chautemps	Prime Minister of France; 1938	Succeeded by Édouard Daladier
Preceded by Georges Bidault	President of the Provisional Government of France; 1946–1947	Succeeded by Vincent Auriol as President of France
Preceded by Georges Bidault	President of the Provisional Government of France; 1946–1947	Succeeded by Paul Ramadier as Prime Minister of France
