= Maurice Viollette =

French politician (1870–1960)

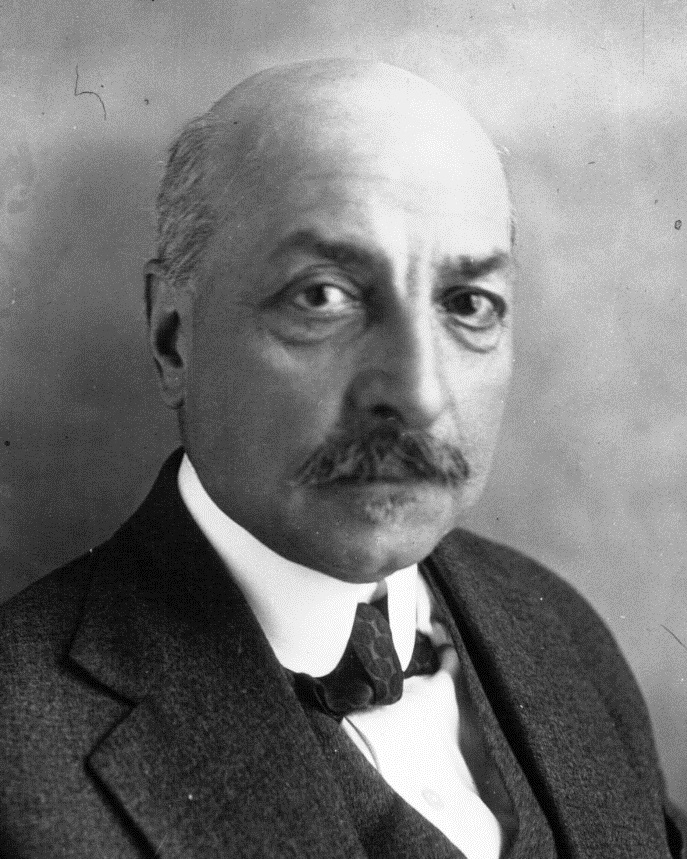
- Maurice Viollette, 1929
- Born: Maurice Gabriel Viollette; 3 September 1870; Janville, France
- Died: 9 September 1960 (aged 90); Dreux, France
- Occupation: Politician, legal advocate in France
- Awards: Croix de guerre 1914–1918
- Position held: senator of the French Third Republic (1930–1939), deputy (1902–1906), deputy (1906–1910), deputy (1910–1914), deputy (1914–1919), deputy (1924–1928), deputy (1928–1930), deputy (1945–1946), deputy (1946–1946), deputy (1946–1951), deputy (1951–1955), Governor of Algeria (1925–1927), mayor (1908–1940), President of the General Council of Eure-et-Loir (1921–1960), mayor (1944–1959), minister of state (1936–1938), minister of state (1938–1938), minister (1917–1917)

Maurice Gabriel Viollette (French pronunciation: [mɔʁis vjɔlɛt]; 3 September 1870 – 9 September 1960) was a French lawyer, politician and statesman who served in government as Minister of General Supply and Maritime Transport in 1917 amid World War I, a Minister of State from 1936 to 1938 and again in 1938 under the Popular Front, as well as Governor General of Algeria from 1925 to 1927.

For his actions in battle in World War I defending the national territory from the German invasion in Oise as a captain, Viollette was awarded the Croix de guerre 1914–1918. In 1956 he was made an Officer of the Legion of Honour.

== Political career ==
A Radical, Viollette was chief of staff for Alexandre Millerand in the Waldeck-Rousseau government in 1898, before he was elected a deputy for Eure-et-Loir in 1902 and mayor of Dreux from 1908 to 1959, although he was officially revoked during the German occupation from 1940 to 1945. He became president of the General Council of Eure-et-Loir in 1921 and a senator in 1930.

He acted as Supply and Transport Minister in 1917, Governor General of Algeria from 1925 to 1927, and Minister of State for the Front Populaire. He co-authored the Blum-Viollette proposal of 1936, which proposed to grant French citizenship to Algerian elites. Ousted and placed under house arrest by the Vichy government, Viollette was re-elected after the Liberation as mayor and deputy of Dreux. He returned as president of the General Council of Eure-et-Loir as well, having been revoked from office in 1941, a position he retained until his death in 1960 at age 90.
