= Clemenceau (disambiguation) =

Georges Clemenceau (1841–1929) was a French statesman and leader in the First World War.

Clemenceau may also refer to:

- Michel Clemenceau his son, a conservative politician
- The Clemenceau family, a Protestant family from the Vendee
- Martine Clémenceau (born 1949), French singer
- Clemenceau-class aircraft carrier, a class of aircraft carriers of the French Navy
  - Clemenceau (R 98), the lead ship of the class
- Clemenceau metro station, a Brussels metro station
- Mount Clemenceau, a mountain in the Canadian Rockies
- Rue Clémenceau, a commercial and residential street in Beirut, Lebanon
- Clemenceau, Arizona, a former smelter town
- Clemenceau, Saskatchewan, a hamlet in the Canadian province of Saskatchewan
- Clemenceau Urey, Liberian businessman
