= Roger Catroux =

French politician

Roger Catroux (17 January 1913 - 3 November 1982) was a French politician.

Catroux was born in Saïda, Algeria. He represented the Republican Party of Liberty (PRL) in the Constituent Assembly elected in 1946.
