= Clemenceau family =

French Protestant family

- Per fess: first, gules, a key argent; second, argent, a seal gules.
- Origin: Poitou
- Founded: 18th century
- Distinctions: National Order of the Legion of Honour
- Branches: de La Serrie des Chaffauds de La Locquerie des Salinières

The Clemenceau family is a French Protestant family originating from the Vendée.

This family has produced notable physicians and politicians, including Georges Clemenceau, who served multiple times as a minister and as President of the Council of Ministers from 1917 to 1920.

== Surname ==
The family name was originally spelled "Clémenceau" (with an accent), as evidenced in the birth certificate of Georges Clemenceau. However, for unknown reasons, Georges Clemenceau standardized the spelling without the accent in March 1884. This change was officially imposed by him.

== History ==
The family belongs to the Vendée bourgeoisie, with several physicians among its members.

Pierre Benjamin Clemenceau, sieur du Colombier et de La Ronde (1709–1782), a law graduate and parliamentary lawyer, married Charlotte Bouquet. The family resided at the Colombier manor in Mouchamps, acquired in the 17th century. Pierre-Paul Clemenceau, his son, was a physician in the Armies of the West during the War in the Vendée. He also served as mayor of Mouchamps, sub-prefect of Montaigu, and as a deputy in the Legislative Corps in 1805 under the First French Empire. He was also a key figure in the republican movement in Vendée, leading the "Bleus de Montaigu."

Paul, his son, married Thérèse Joubert in 1809, inheriting the Aubraie estate, a gentleman's house in La Réorthe, in the Vendée bocage. This estate had been acquired by his father from a nobleman unable to repay an 80000 livres debt. Benjamin Clemenceau, his son, was an ardent republican, atheist, and an enthusiast of art, literature, and philosophy. He instilled revolutionary ideals and a disdain for monarchy in his son, Georges Clemenceau, who became a prominent politician and reformer.

== Lineage ==
Civil records document the lineage of Pierre Benjamin Clemenceau and Charlotte Bouquet, whose descendants survive today.

{{{Pierre Benjamin Clemenceau (1709–1782), lawyer}}}
{{{Paul Jean Benjamin Clemenceau (1777–1860), physician, mayor of La Réorthe}}}
{{{spouse Sophie Gautreau (1817–1903)}}}

{{{spouse Charlotte Bouquet}}}
{{{spouse Gabrielle Joubert}}}

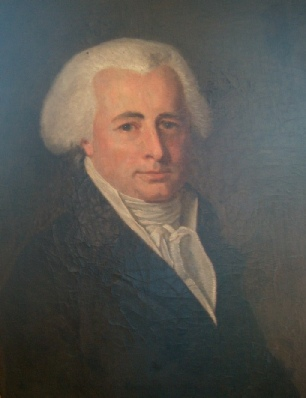
Pierre-Paul Clemenceau (1749–1825)

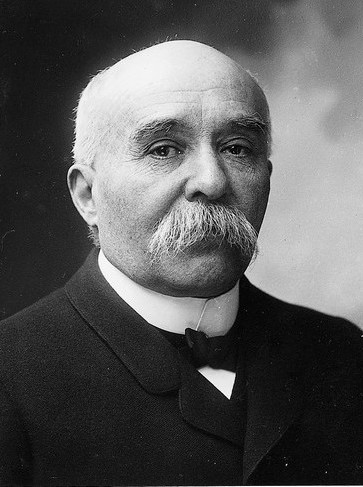
Georges Clemenceau (1841–1929)

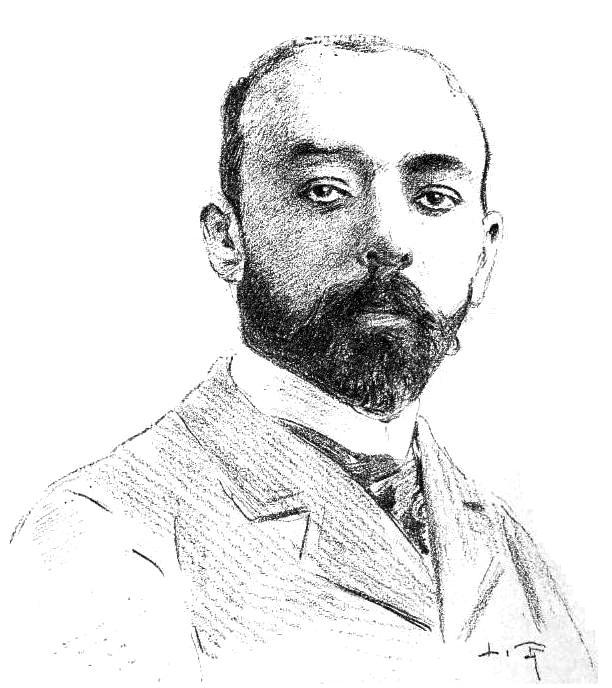
Albert Clemenceau (1861–1955)

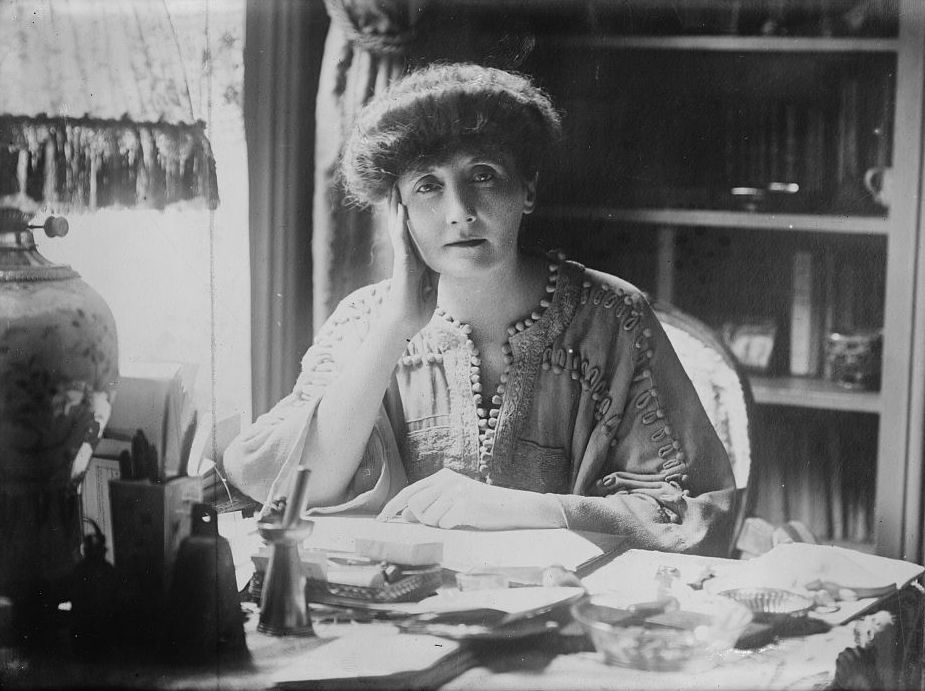
Madeleine Clemenceau (1870–1949)

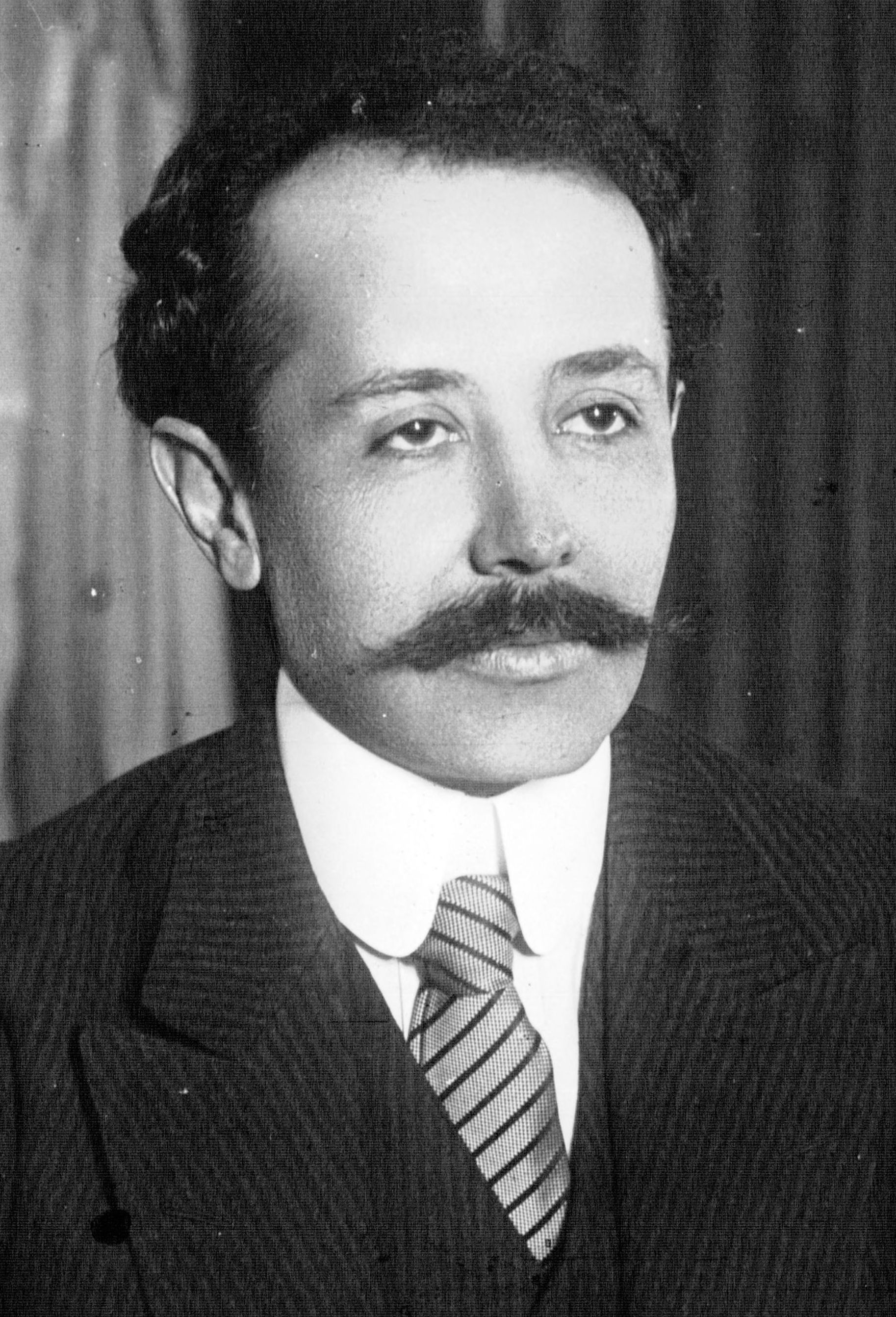
Michel Clemenceau (1873–1964)

== Sources ==
- Brodziak, Sylvie (2015). Clemenceau (in French). Presses universitaires de Vincennes. doi:10.3917/puv.brodz.2015.01. ISBN 978-2-84292-435-5.
- Brodziak, Sylvie; Melet-Sanson, Jacqueline, eds. (2018). Georges Clemenceau: le courage de la République (in French). Éditions du Patrimoine, Centre des monuments nationaux. ISBN 9782757706350.
- Minart, Gérard (2005). Clemenceau journaliste (1841-1929): les combats d'un républicain pour la liberté et la justice (in French). Paris: L'Harmattan. ISBN 2-7475-8475-5.
- Winock, Michel (2010) [2007]. Clemenceau (in French). Paris: Perrin. ISBN 978-2-262-03498-6.
