= Treaty of Guarantee =

The Treaty of Guarantee may refer to:

- Treaty of Guarantee (proposed), 1919, between France, the United Kingdom and the United States
- Treaty of Guarantee (1960) between Cyprus, Greece, Turkey and the United Kingdom
