= Michel Clemenceau =

French politician (1873–1964)

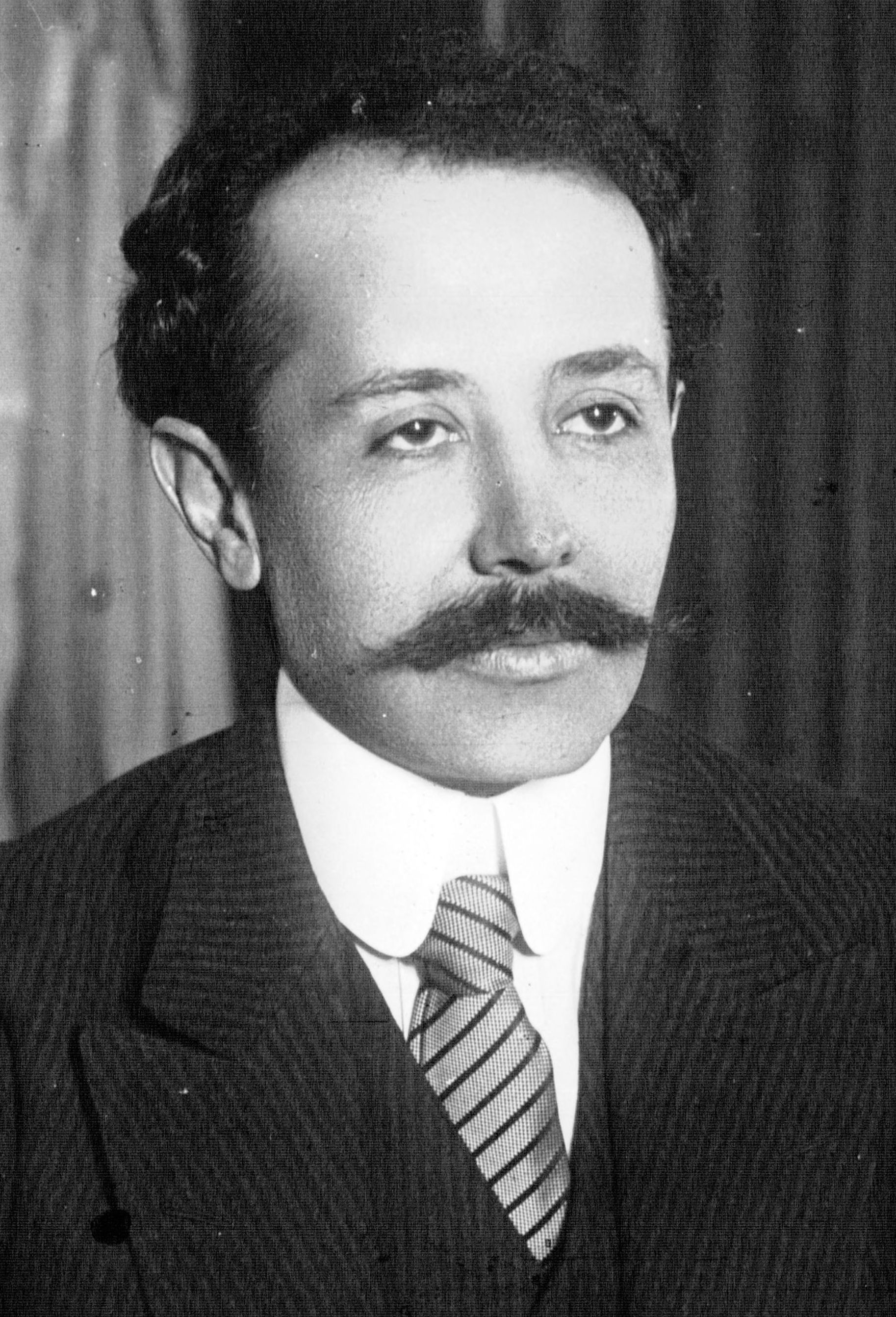
- Michel Clemenceau in 1909

Member of the National Assembly of France
- In office 6 November 1945 – 3 July 1951 (5 years, 239 days)
- Constituency: Seine-et-Marne

Personal details
- Born: Michel William Benjamin Clemenceau; 24 November 1873 La Réorthe, France
- Died: 4 March 1964 (aged 90) Moret-sur-Loing, France
- Party: Republican Party of Liberty
- Parents: Georges Clemenceau (father); Mary Plummer (mother)
- Profession: Agricultural engineer Businessperson

Michel Clemenceau (born 24 November 1873 in La Réorthe (Vendée) and died 4 March 1964 in Moret-sur-Loing (Seine-et-Marne) was a French politician.

The son of Georges Clemenceau, he served as a deputy from 1945 to 1951.

== Biography ==
=== Family and career ===
The son of Georges Clemenceau and American Mary Plummer, Michel Clemenceau spent part of his childhood with his paternal grandfather Benjamin at the family manor in L'Aubraie, located in Féole in La Réorthe (Vendée).

Undisciplined and expelled from several schools, including École Monge in Paris, he was sent by his father to Zurich around 1888 to study under a private tutor, followed by courses at the Agricultural Institute, graduating as an agricultural engineer in 1894.

Returning to France in 1905, he engaged in business ventures of varying legitimacy, which sometimes tarnished his father's reputation (accused of favoring his son in dealings with military procurement). One of his associates, called Le François, was convicted of fraud in 1910. Estranged due to these actions, "the Tiger" and his son reconciled only in 1914 when Michel enlisted for World War I.

=== World wars ===
As a lieutenant interpreter in the Colonial Army Corps of the 6th Army, Michel Clemenceau was wounded on 21 August 1914 during an encounter with a Uhlan. After recovering, he served as a staff captain for his corps.

In September 1918, he was part of the first battalion to enter Saint-Mihiel. At the war's end, he was promoted to major and named an Officer of the Legion of Honour.

During World War II, he served as a staff officer in the Deuxième Bureau, responsible for intelligence. Following the 1940 defeat, he opposed the Vichy government and was arrested in 1943 for his resistance activities. Deported to the Eisenberg Castle and later the Itter Castle in Austria, he was liberated by American forces on 5 May 1945.

=== Political career ===
After the Liberation of France, Michel Clemenceau was elected as a representative for Seine-et-Marne in the French Constituent Assembly of 1945 and reelected to the French Constituent Assembly of 1946. He was the Republican Party of Liberty's candidate for the 1947 French presidential election, coming last with 60 votes out of 883.

== Decorations ==
- Commandeur de la Légion d'honneur - 11 July 1947
- Officier de la Légion d'honneur - 7 July 1927
- Chevalier de la Légion d'honneur - 30 July 1916
- Croix de guerre 1914-1918
- Military Cross - UK
- Chevalier de l'ordre de la Couronne
