= Mouilleron-Saint-Germain =

- Commune
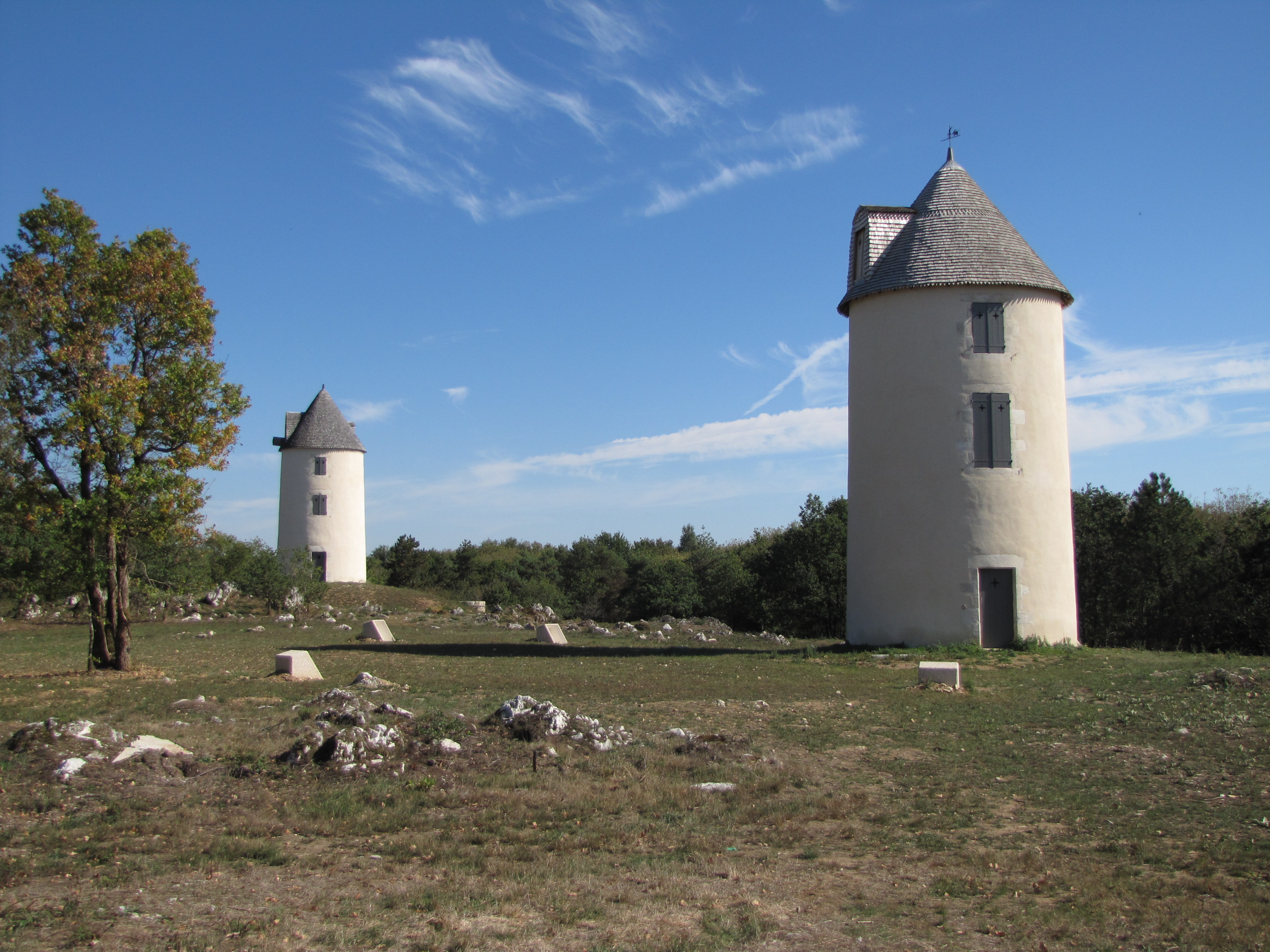
- Windmills of Mouilleron-en-Pareds
- Location of Mouilleron-Saint-Germain
- Location within France Location within Pays de la Loire
- Coordinates: 46°40′34″N 0°50′53″W
- Country: France
- Region: Pays de la Loire
- Department: Vendée
- Arrondissement: Fontenay-le-Comte
- Canton: La Châtaigneraie

Government
  - Mayor (2020–2026): Valentin Josse
- Area^{1}: 28.40 km^{2} (10.97 sq mi)
- Population (2023): 1,744
  - Density: 61.41/km^{2} (159.0/sq mi)
- Time zone: UTC+01:00 (CET)
  - Summer (DST): UTC+02:00 (CEST)
- INSEE/Postal code: 85154 /85390
- ^{1} French Land Register data, which excludes lakes, ponds, glaciers > 1 km^{2} (0.386 sq mi or 247 acres) and river estuaries.

Mouilleron-Saint-Germain is a commune in the department of Vendée, western France. The municipality was established on 1 January 2016 by merger of the former communes of Mouilleron-en-Pareds and Saint-Germain-l'Aiguiller.

== See also ==
- Communes of the Vendée department
