= Mouilleron-en-Pareds =

- Part of Mouilleron-Saint-Germain
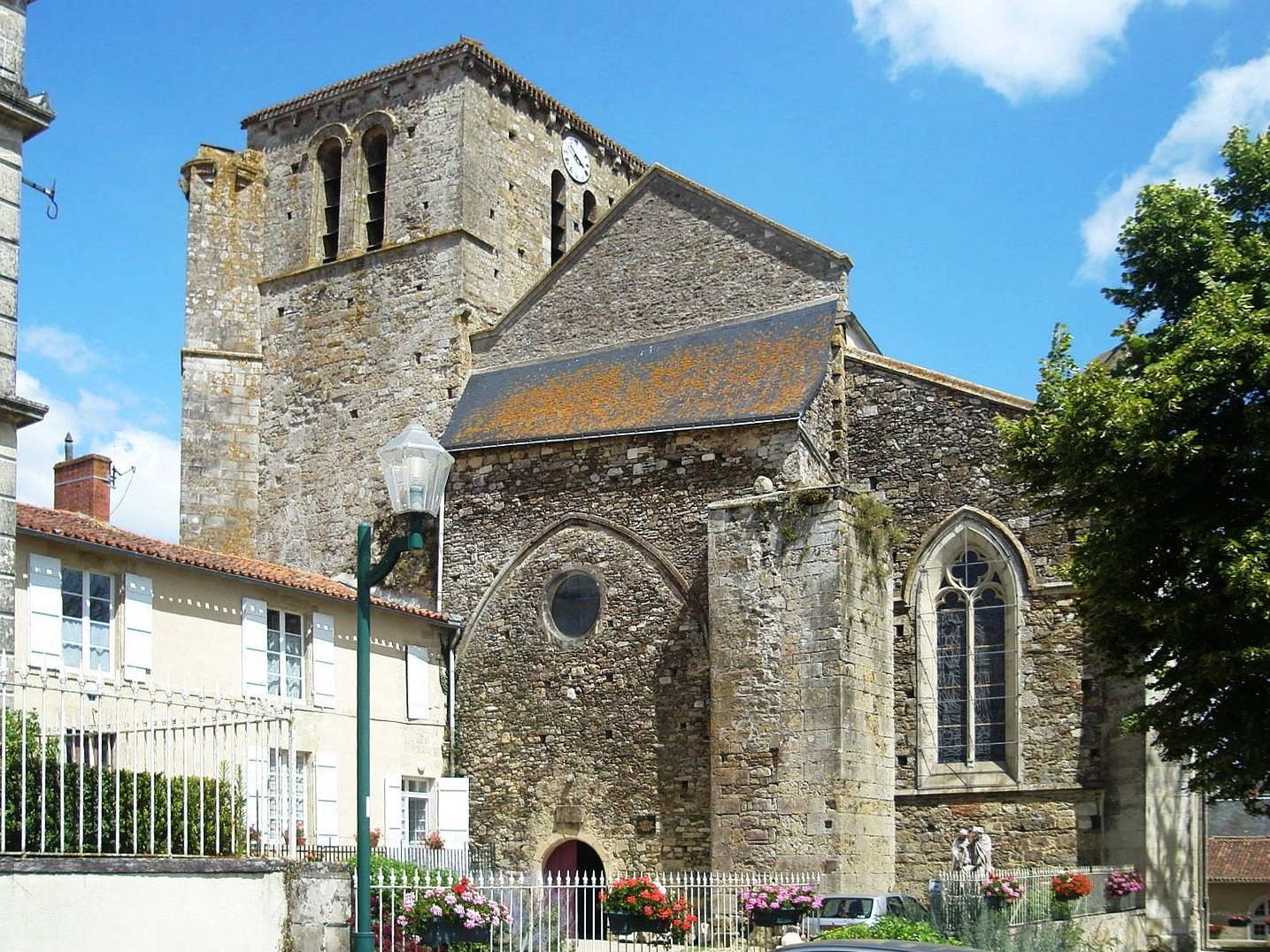
- The church of Saint-Hilaire, in Mouilleron-en-Pareds

- Coat of arms
- Location of Mouilleron-en-Pareds
- Location within France Location within Pays de la Loire
- Coordinates: 46°40′36″N 0°51′00″W
- Country: France
- Region: Pays de la Loire
- Department: Vendée
- Arrondissement: Fontenay-le-Comte
- Canton: La Châtaigneraie
- Commune: Mouilleron-Saint-Germain
- Area^{1}: 19.97 km^{2} (7.71 sq mi)
- Highest elevation: 182 m (597 ft)
- Lowest elevation: 60 m (200 ft)
- Population (2022): 1,334
  - Density: 66.80/km^{2} (173.0/sq mi)
- Time zone: UTC+01:00 (CET)
  - Summer (DST): UTC+02:00 (CEST)
- Postal code: 85390
- ^{1} French Land Register data, which excludes lakes, ponds, glaciers > 1 km^{2} (0.386 sq mi or 247 acres) and river estuaries.

Mouilleron-en-Pareds (French pronunciation: [mujʁɔ̃ ɑ̃ paʁɛ]) is a former commune in the Vendée department in the Pays de la Loire region in western France. On 1 January 2016, it was merged into the new commune of Mouilleron-Saint-Germain. It is in the arrondissement of Fontenay-le-Comte.

It is known as the place of birth of Charles-Louis Largeteau (who contributed to the establishment of the Greenwich Meridian), Georges Clemenceau (head of the French government during World War I and who signed the Treaty of Versailles with Lloyd George, Vittorio Emanuele Orlando and Woodrow Wilson) and Marshal Jean de Lattre de Tassigny (who later led the French First Army during the liberation of France with the Allied forces in 1945).

== See also ==
- Communes of the Vendée department
