= Clemenceau, Saskatchewan =

Hamlet in Saskatchewan, Canada

Coordinates: 52°39′51″N 102°31′38″W

Farmyard near Clemenceau

Clemenceau is a hamlet in the Canadian province of Saskatchewan named after Georges Clemenceau, the French physician, journalist and statesman.

Clemenceau is located on the Canadian National Railway approximately 27 kilometres (17 miles) south of Hudson Bay, Saskatchewan, and by 1929 the town was one of the largest shipping points of railcar lots of lumber in the province. The lumber industry was the key industry of the town, but a forest fire in 1942 seriously damaged forestry in the area. In 1950, Clemenceau was one of nine provincial land settlement projects after World War II, and was primarily a resettlement block for farmers.

As of 2011, a Federal grain elevator in Clemenceau still stands adjacent to the railway.

== Demographics ==
In the 2021 Census of Population conducted by Statistics Canada, Clemenceau had a population of 15 living in 6 of its 24 total private dwellings, a change of 50% from its 2016 population of 10. With a land area of 0.27 km^{2} (0.10 sq mi), it had a population density of 55.6/km^{2} (143.9/sq mi) in 2021.

== See also ==
- List of communities in Saskatchewan
