= Republican Party of Liberty =

Republican Party of Liberty Parti républicain de la liberté
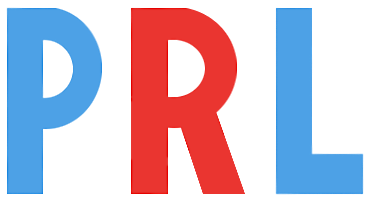
- Abbreviation: PRL
- President: Michel Clemenceau
- Founded: December 22, 1945
- Dissolved: June 17, 1951
- Preceded by: Republican Federation
- Merged into: National Centre of Independents and Peasants
- Headquarters: Paris, France
- Ideology: Conservatism; Republicanism; Anti-communism
- Political position: Centre-right to right-wing
- Colours: Blue, White and Red

The Republican Party of Liberty (French: Parti républicain de la liberté, PRL) was a centre-right to right-wing French political party founded after the Liberation of France on 22 December 1945 by Joseph Laniel, André Mutter, Édouard Frédéric-Dupont and Jules Ramarony. It was the only significant right-wing conservative political party in the late 1940s. Key elements in this program were enacted, including the exclusion of the Communist Party from power, closer relations with the United States, and amnesty for Marshal Philippe Pétain's supporters. It was absorbed by the National Centre of Independents and Peasants (CNI) in 1951.

The PRL's aim was to unite French conservatives, who had been totally discredited in 1944 due to the numbers of Vichy collaborators in their ranks, and the role they played during the interwar period. Bernard Frank mocked "this right which suddenly discovered in itself a love for the Republic and liberty." The PRL's tentative approach failed, most conservative leaders trying to conserve their autonomy or to recreate parties of the Third Republic such as the Democratic Alliance, the Republican Federation or the Republican Social Party of French Reconciliation (Parti républicain social de la réconciliation française).

The PRL campaigned for a "no" vote in the May 1946 referendum on the Constitution. It obtained 38 seats in the November 1946 legislative elections. The party was presided over by Michel Clemenceau (son of Georges), who obtained 60 votes out of 883 during the 1947 presidential election — under the Fourth Republic, the President was elected by members of the two chambers of Parliament, not by universal suffrage.

The PRL then obtained 11 Senators in the indirect elections for the Council of the Republic of 1948. After numerous internal dissensions, the PRL merged into the CNI in 1951, while some members joined the Gaullist Rally of the French People.

== Members ==
- Michel Clemenceau, President.
- Robert Bertolaud
- Édouard Barrachin
- Henry Bergasse
- François Brigneau
- Robert Bruyneel
- Fernand Chevalier
- Jean Crouzier
- Édouard Frédéric-Dupont
- Henri Giraud
- Louis Jacquinot
- Pierre July
- Joseph Laniel
- Joseph Lecacheux
- Jean Legendre
- Pierre Montel
- André Mutter
- Georges Pernot
- Jules Ramarony
- Paul Reynaud
