= Charles-Louis Largeteau =

French physicist and astronomer (1791–1857)

- Born: 23 July 1791; Mouilleron-en-Pareds
- Died: 11 September 1857 (aged 66); Pouzauges
- Education: École Polytechnique
- Scientific career
- Fields: Physics and astronomy

Charles-Louis Largeteau (1791–1857) was a French physicist and astronomer. He was born in Mouilleron-en-Pareds in the Vendée into a poor family. His father, a gunner, died in the 1793 Battle of Le Mans. He was taken in by an uncle in Fontenay-le-Comte, and excelled at school there, moving to grammar school in Poitiers. He studied then at the École Polytechnique. In 1813, he joined the Corps royal du génie, where he worked mapping France.

In 1825, he participated, alongside John Herschel in a joint French-British governmental study of the difference in longitudes between the observatories of Paris and Greenwich. In 1829, he entered the Bureau des Longitudes and, in 1832, became the secretary-librarian of the Paris Observatory and studied geodesy with François Arago. He both edited and submitted to the Connaissance des Temps, the astronomical ephemerides used by many navigators, geographers and astronomers of the time.

He developed a method of calculating tables to determine the phases of the moon over much longer durations than before (over 30 centuries). Presented at the French Academy of Sciences, it earned admission as a Free Academician on December 13, 1847. This work, in concert with a Xia dynasty document preserved in a Chinese classic, the Book of Documents, allowed the calculation of the date of a solar eclipse recorded during the reign of Zhong Kang.

He was appointed a Chavalier of the Legion of Honour.

He died aged 66 in Pouzauges in the Vendée in 1857. He had one daughter.
