= Albert Clemenceau =

French lawyer and politician (1861-1955)

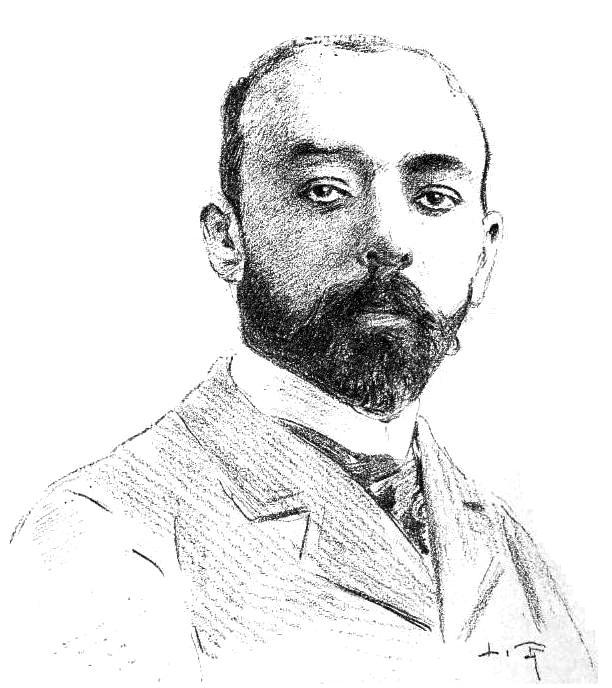
- Born: Albert Adrien Clemenceau; 23 February 1861; Nantes
- Died: 23 July 1955 (aged 94); Sceaux
- Occupations: Lawyer, politician

Albert Clemenceau (23 February 1861 – 23 July 1955) was a French lawyer and politician. Georges Clemenceau was his brother.

Along with Fernand Labori, he was one of the defenders in the trials linked to the Dreyfus affair.
