= Saint-Germain-l'Aiguiller =

- Part of Mouilleron-Saint-Germain
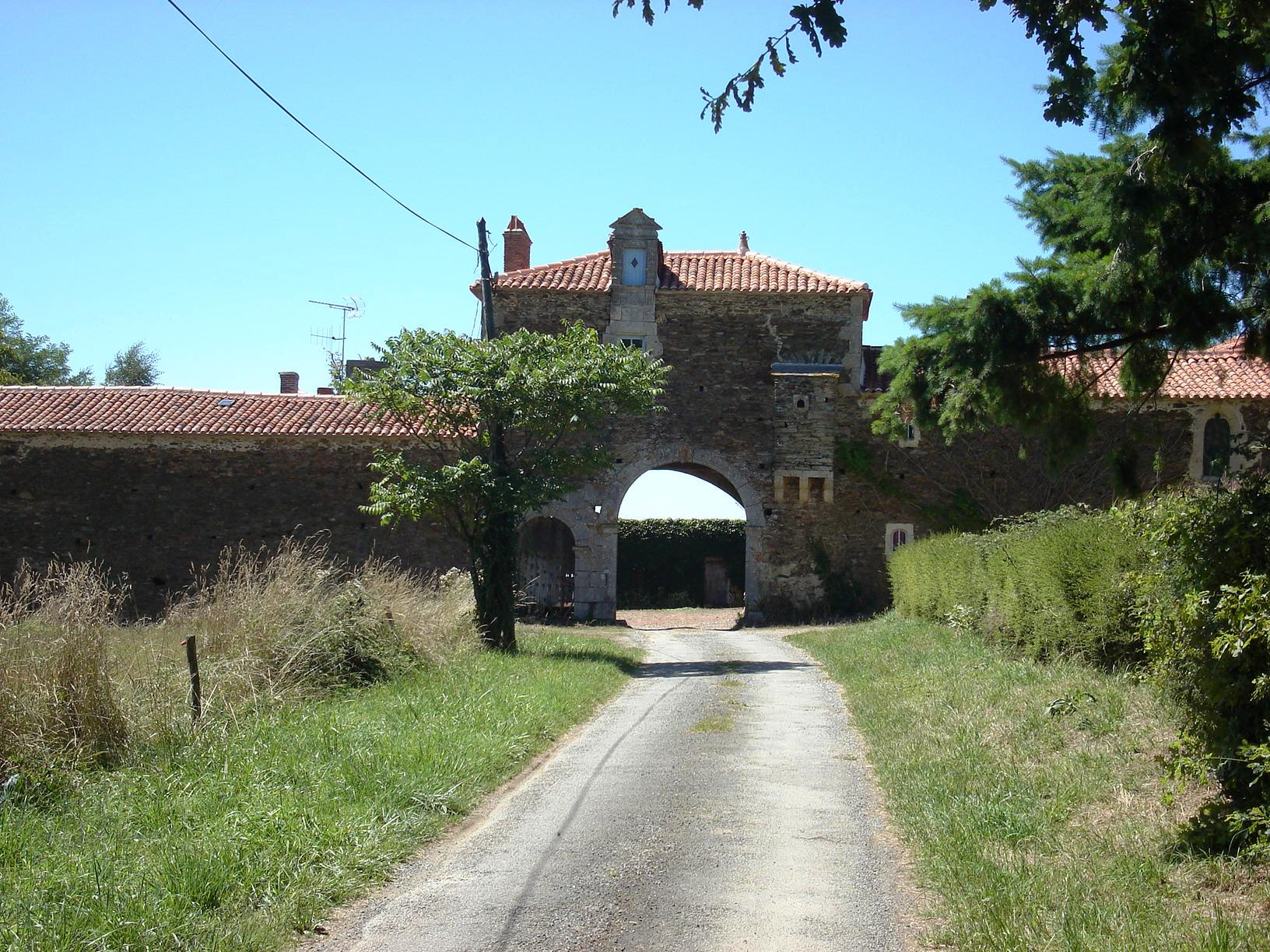
- Vigneau Manor
- Location of Saint-Germain-l'Aiguiller
- Location within France Location within Pays de la Loire
- Coordinates: 46°41′18″N 0°50′26″W
- Country: France
- Region: Pays de la Loire
- Department: Vendée
- Arrondissement: Fontenay-le-Comte
- Canton: La Châtaigneraie
- Commune: Mouilleron-Saint-Germain
- Area^{1}: 8.43 km^{2} (3.25 sq mi)
- Highest elevation: 161 m (528 ft)
- Lowest elevation: 94 m (308 ft)
- Population (2022): 415
  - Density: 49.2/km^{2} (128/sq mi)
- Time zone: UTC+01:00 (CET)
  - Summer (DST): UTC+02:00 (CEST)
- Postal code: 85390
- ^{1} French Land Register data, which excludes lakes, ponds, glaciers > 1 km^{2} (0.386 sq mi or 247 acres) and river estuaries.

Saint-Germain-l'Aiguiller (French pronunciation: [sɛ̃ ʒɛʁmɛ̃ lɛɡɥije]) is a former commune in the Vendée department in the Pays de la Loire region in western France. On 1 January 2016, it was merged into the new commune of Mouilleron-Saint-Germain.

== See also ==
- Communes of the Vendée department
