= Fernand Chevalier =

French politician

Fernand Chevalier (8 December 1898 – 9 May 1980) was a French politician.

Chevalier was born in El Affroun, Algeria. He represented the Republican Party of Liberty (PRL) in the Constituent Assembly elected in 1946 and in the National Assembly from 1946 to 1951.
