= Treaty of Guarantee (proposed) =

1919 agreement to guarantee the French border against future German aggression

The Treaty of Guarantee was an agreement in which the United Kingdom and the United States guaranteed the French border against future German aggression. It came out of a proposal by British Prime Minister David Lloyd George at the Paris Peace Conference in 1919, after World War I, as a compromise to French Marshal Ferdinand Foch's insistence for the French-German border to be pushed back to the Rhine. Foch felt that the new border would prevent another German invasion into France. (France had been invaded from across the Rhine five times within just over a century: in 1814, 1815, 1870, 1914 and 1918.)

== Origins at Versailles ==
Along with Foch, French Prime Minister Georges Clemenceau had demanded for Germany's western border to be fixed at the Rhine. Clemenceau relented when the Treaty of Guarantee was proposed, but Foch insisted that the French occupation of the Rhineland was crucial to halt future German aggression.

== Lloyd George's proposal and Foch's protest ==
Lloyd George suggested a compromise. If France relinquished its claims on the Rhine, the United Kingdom and the United States would guarantee the French border against future German aggression. Wilson agreed and treaties to that effect were drawn up. Foch had stated:

"If we do not hold the Rhine permanently there is no neutralization, no disarmament, no written clause of any nature, which can prevent Germany from breaking out across it and gaining the upper hand. No aid could arrive in time from England or America to save France from complete defeat".

== Rejection ==
In return for abandoning the Rhine, Clemenceau accepted solemn guarantees of his country's frontier from his two great allies. Both houses of the British Parliament approved the Treaty of Guarantee in July 1919 under the condition of its ratification by the United States. However, the US Senate refused to approve either it or the Treaty of Versailles, which nullified the British assent.

Clemenceau had been promised that aid in return for giving up the security of the Rhine that his generals had demanded. It was believed that Germany would not have invaded France if it known by Germans that to the British and the Americans would oppose the invasion by military force.

The rejection made Clemenceau unpopular and so ended his political career.
