= Mary Plummer =

Wife of Georges Clemenceau

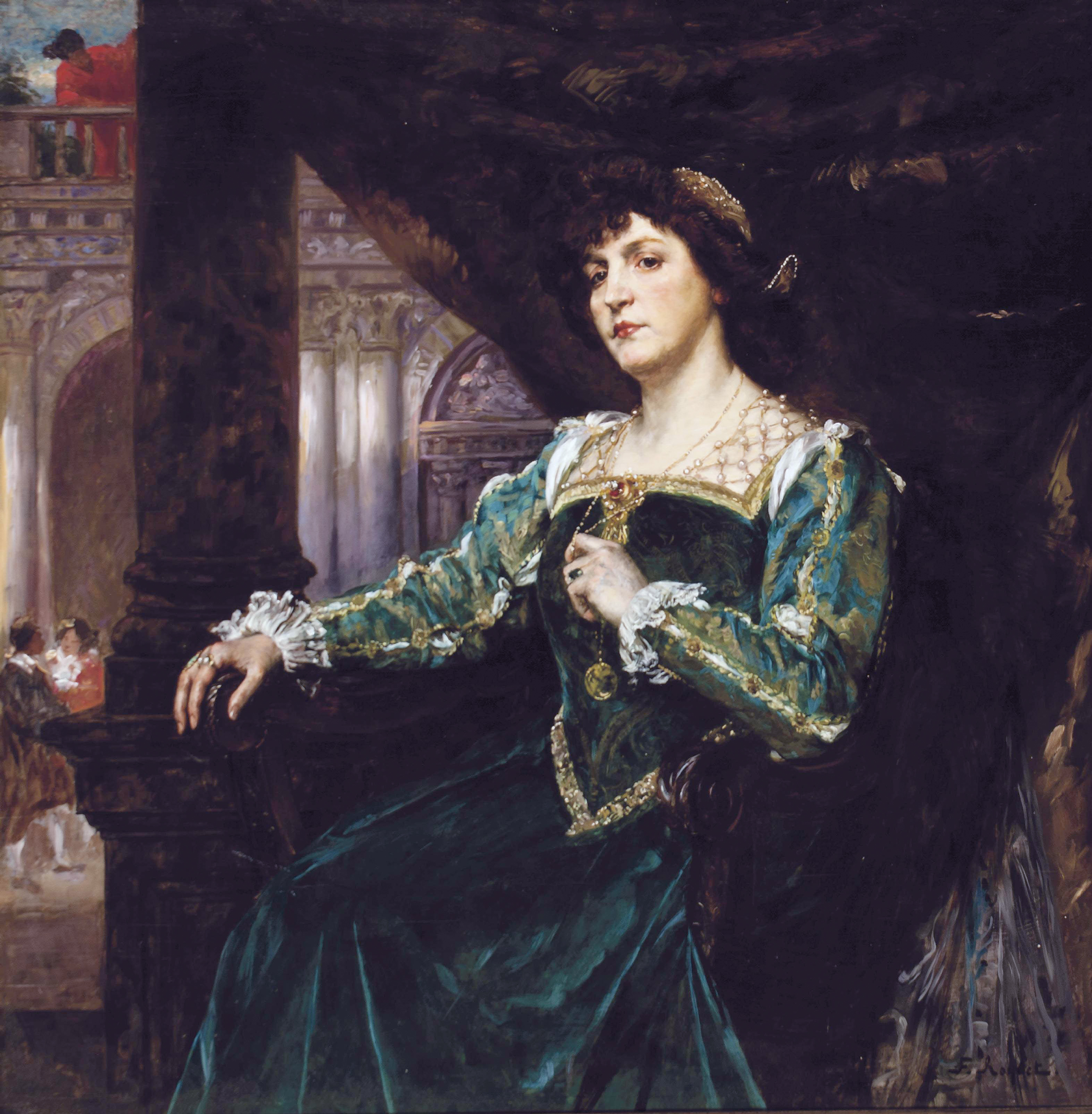
Mary Plummer, by Ferdinand Roybet

Mary Elizabeth Plummer (18 March 1849 – 13 September 1922) was an American-born pupil of and later the wife of Georges Clemenceau, Prime Minister of France during Third Republic. Plummer was a native of Springfield, Massachusetts. Clemenceau arrived in the United States in 1865 after fleeing France due to involvement in radical political activism during the regime of Napoleon III. He eventually taught at a girls school in Stamford, Connecticut, which Plummer attended. The two wed in 1869 and moved to France a year later. Together they had three children. Plummer and Clemenceau separated in 1876 and divorced in 1891.

Though Clemenceau had many mistresses, when his wife took as her lover a tutor of their children, he had her put in jail for two weeks and sent her back to the United States on a steamer in third class. He divorced her, obtained custody of their children and had her stripped of her French nationality.
