= Mouchamps =

- Commune
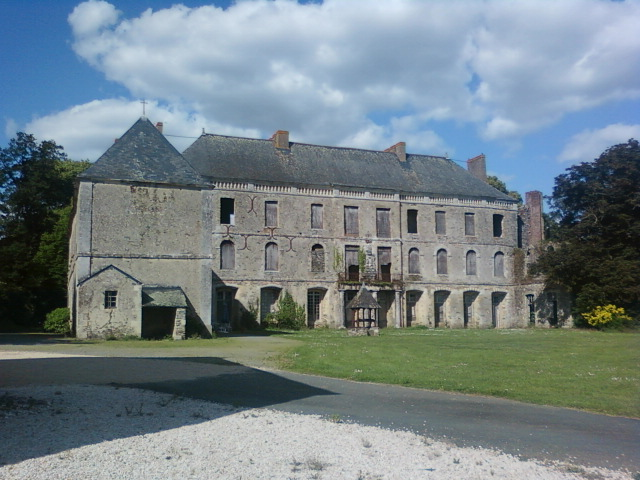
- The Château of Soubise Park
- Location of Mouchamps
- Location within France Location within Pays de la Loire
- Coordinates: 46°46′53″N 1°03′42″W
- Country: France
- Region: Pays de la Loire
- Department: Vendée
- Arrondissement: La Roche-sur-Yon
- Canton: Les Herbiers
- Intercommunality: Pays des Herbiers

Government
  - Mayor (2020–2026): Patrick Mandin
- Area^{1}: 55 km^{2} (21 sq mi)
- Highest elevation: 121 m (397 ft)
- Lowest elevation: 47 m (154 ft)
- Population (2023): 3,015
  - Density: 55/km^{2} (140/sq mi)
- Time zone: UTC+01:00 (CET)
  - Summer (DST): UTC+02:00 (CEST)
- INSEE/Postal code: 85153 /85640
- ^{1} French Land Register data, which excludes lakes, ponds, glaciers > 1 km^{2} (0.386 sq mi or 247 acres) and river estuaries.

Mouchamps (French pronunciation: [muʃɑ̃]) is a commune in the Vendée department in the Pays de la Loire region in western France.

The grave of the noted French prime minister, Georges Clemenceau, is located near Mouchamps at the small hamlet of Le Colombier. It may be reached by following the D28 road from the center of Mouchamps northeastward approximately two and one-half miles to a road on the right signposted as "La Brachetiere", "La Monceliere", and "Colombier". Very shortly after that initial right turn, the route takes a further right turn at the sign marked "Tombeau de Clemenceau". A separate sign says "Colombier", and the route continues on that road for approximately one and one-half miles. The tomb (along with that of Clemenceau's father) is on the left (in a small wooded area.)

== Population ==
Historical population
Year	Pop.	±% p.a.
1968	2,434	—
1975	2,235	−1.21%
1982	2,293	+0.37%
1990	2,398	+0.56%
1999	2,443	+0.21%
2007	2,585	+0.71%
2012	2,811	+1.69%
2017	2,886	+0.53%
2023	3,015	+0.73%
Source: INSEE

== See also ==
- Communes of the Vendée department
