= La Réorthe =

- Commune
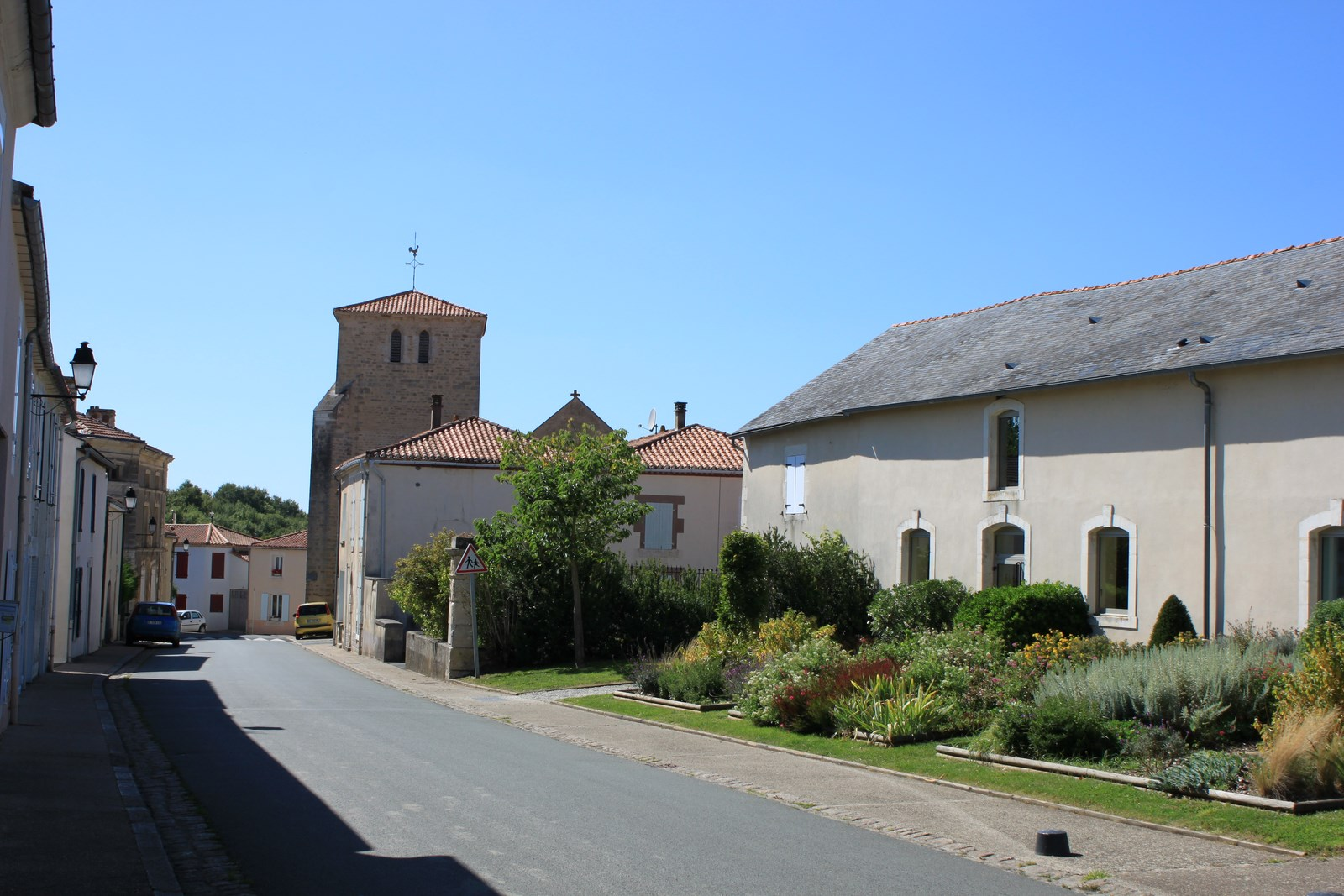
- The church and the town hall

- Coat of arms
- Location of La Réorthe
- Location within France Location within Pays de la Loire
- Coordinates: 46°36′28″N 1°02′55″W
- Country: France
- Region: Pays de la Loire
- Department: Vendée
- Arrondissement: Fontenay-le-Comte
- Canton: La Châtaigneraie
- Intercommunality: Sud Vendée Littoral

Government
  - Mayor (2020–2026): Magalie Grolleau
- Area^{1}: 23.88 km^{2} (9.22 sq mi)
- Highest elevation: 104 m (341 ft)
- Lowest elevation: 15 m (49 ft)
- Population (2023): 1,161
  - Density: 48.62/km^{2} (125.9/sq mi)
- Time zone: UTC+01:00 (CET)
  - Summer (DST): UTC+02:00 (CEST)
- INSEE/Postal code: 85188 /85210
- ^{1} French Land Register data, which excludes lakes, ponds, glaciers > 1 km^{2} (0.386 sq mi or 247 acres) and river estuaries.

La Réorthe (French pronunciation: [la ʁeɔʁt]) is a commune in the Vendée department in the Pays de la Loire region in western France.

== See also ==
- Communes of the Vendée department
