= Georges Clemenceau =

Prime Minister of France (1906–1909, 1917–1920)

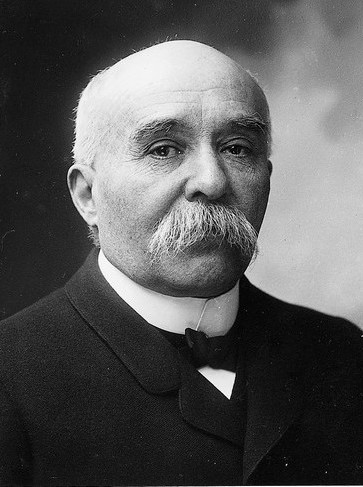
- Portrait by Nadar, 1904

Prime Minister of France
- In office 16 November 1917 – 20 January 1920
- President: Raymond Poincaré
- Preceded by: Paul Painlevé
- Succeeded by: Alexandre Millerand
- In office 25 October 1906 – 24 July 1909
- President: Armand Fallières
- Preceded by: Ferdinand Sarrien
- Succeeded by: Aristide Briand

Minister of War
- In office 16 November 1917 – 20 January 1920
- Prime Minister: Himself
- Preceded by: Paul Painlevé
- Succeeded by: André Joseph Lefèvre

Minister of the Interior
- In office 14 March 1906 – 24 July 1909
- Prime Minister: Ferdinand Sarrien; Himself
- Preceded by: Fernand Dubief
- Succeeded by: Aristide Briand
Parliamentary offices
Senator for Var
In office 6 April 1902 – 10 January 1910
Preceded by	Ernest Denormandie
Succeeded by	Gustave Fourment
Member of the Chamber of Deputies
In office 15 October 1885 – 14 October 1893
Preceded by	Auguste Maurel
Succeeded by	Joseph Jourdan
Constituency	Var
In office 9 March 1876 – 14 October 1885
Constituency	Seine
Member of the National Assembly
In office 12 February 1871 – 17 March 1871
Constituency	Seine

President of the Council of Paris
- In office 28 November 1875 – 24 April 1876
- Preceded by: Pierre Marmottan
- Succeeded by: Barthélemy Forest

Personal details
- Born: Georges Benjamin Clémenceau; 28 September 1841 Mouilleron-en-Pareds, France
- Died: 24 November 1929 (aged 88) Paris, France
- Resting place: Mouchamps, Vendée
- Party: Radical Republicans (1871–1901); Radical Party (1901–1914); Independent Radicals (1914–1929)
- Spouse: Mary Eliza Plummer (m. 1869; div. 1891)
- Children: 3 (including Michel)
- Education: University of Paris
- Profession: Physician, journalist, statesman
- Nicknames: Father Victory; The Tiger

Georges Benjamin Clemenceau (Note: /ˈklɛmənsoʊ/, also US: /ˌklɛmənˈsoʊ, ˌkleɪmɒ̃ˈsoʊ/; French: [ʒɔʁʒ(ə) bɛ̃ʒamɛ̃ klemɑ̃so]; Clemenceau's name is spelled with an ⟨e⟩ and not with the ⟨é⟩ that is normally required in French for the pronunciation /e/. Clemenceau indeed preferred the spelling pronunciation [kləmɑ̃so], but current usage has adopted the vowel /e/ by analogy with the name Clément.) (28 September 1841 – 24 November 1929) was a French statesman who was prime minister of France from 1906 to 1909 and again from 1917 until 1920. A physician turned journalist, he played a central role in the politics of the Third Republic, particularly amid the end of the First World War. He was a key figure of the Independent Radicals, advocating for the separation of church and state, as well as the amnesty of the Communards exiled to New Caledonia.

After about 1,400,000 French soldiers were killed between the German invasion and Armistice, he demanded a total victory over the German Empire. Clemenceau stood for reparations, a transfer of colonies, strict rules to prevent a rearming process, as well as the restitution of Alsace–Lorraine, which had been annexed to Germany in 1871. He achieved these goals through the Treaty of Versailles signed at the Paris Peace Conference (1919–1920). Nicknamed Père la Victoire ("Father Victory") or Le Tigre ("The Tiger"), he continued his harsh position against Germany in the 1920s, although not quite so much as President Raymond Poincaré or former Supreme Allied Commander Ferdinand Foch, both of whom thought the treaty was too lenient on Germany. Clemenceau obtained mutual defence treaties with the United Kingdom and the United States against possible future German aggression, but these never took effect due to the U.S. Senate's failure to ratify the treaty, which in turn released Britain from its obligation.

== Early years ==
Clemenceau was a native of Vendée, born in Mouilleron-en-Pareds. During the period of the French Revolution, Vendée had been a hotbed of monarchist sympathies. The department was remote from Paris, rural, and poor. His mother, Sophie Eucharie Gautreau (1817–1903), was of Huguenot descent. His father, Benjamin Clemenceau (1810–1897), came from a long line of physicians, but lived off his lands and investments and did not practice medicine. Benjamin was a political activist; he was arrested and briefly held in 1851 and again in 1858. He instilled in his son a love of learning, devotion to radical politics, and a hatred of Catholicism.

The lawyer Albert Clemenceau (1861–1955) was his brother. His mother was a devout Protestant; his father was an atheist and insisted that his children should have no religious education. Clemenceau was interested in religious issues. He became a leader of anti-clerical or "Radical" forces that battled against the Catholic Church in France and the Catholics in politics. He stopped short of the more extreme attacks. His position was that if church and state were kept rigidly separated, he would not support oppressive measures designed to further weaken the Catholic Church.

After his studies in the Lycée in Nantes, Clemenceau received his French baccalaureate of letters in 1858. He went to Paris to study medicine and eventually graduated with the completion of his thesis "De la génération des éléments anatomiques" in 1865.

== Political activism and American experience ==
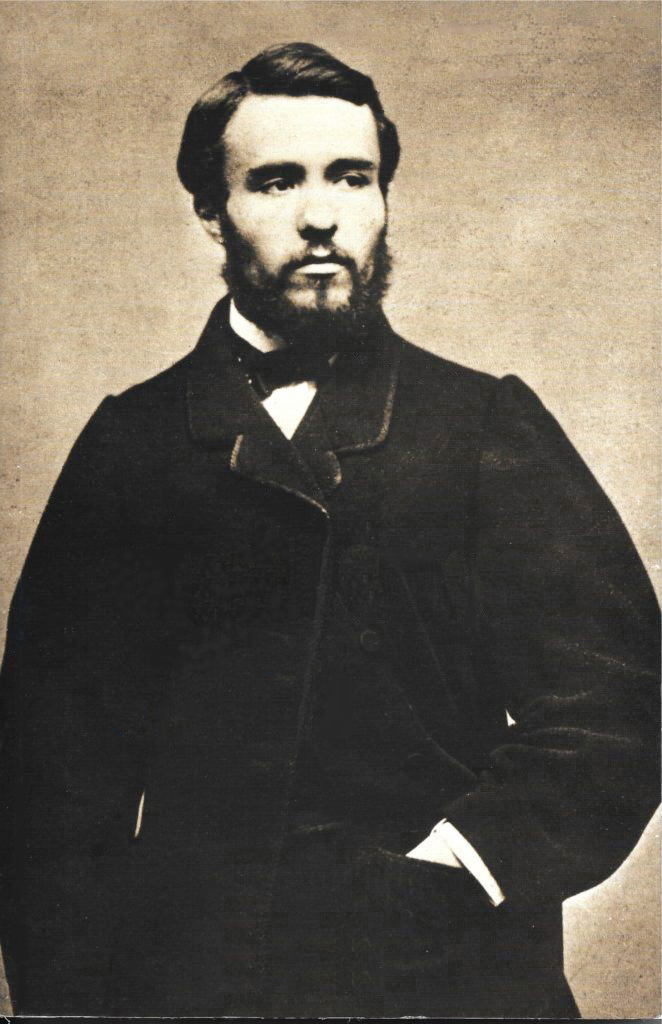
Clemenceau at age 24, c. 1865

In Paris, the young Clemenceau became a political activist and writer. In December 1861, he and some friends co-founded a weekly newsletter, Le Travail. On 23 February 1862, he was arrested by the imperial police for having placed posters summoning a demonstration. He spent 77 days in the Mazas Prison. Around the same time, Clemenceau also visited the old French revolutionary Auguste Blanqui and another Republican activist, Auguste Scheurer-Kestner, in jail, further deepening his hatred of the Napoleon III regime and advancing his fervent republicanism.

He was graduated as a doctor of medicine on 13 May 1865, founded several literary magazines, and wrote many articles, most of which attacked the imperial regime of Napoleon III. After a failed love affair, Clemenceau left France for the United States as the imperial agents began cracking down on dissidents and sending most of them to the bagne de Cayenne (Devil's Island Penal System) in French Guiana.

Clemenceau worked in New York City during the years 1865–1869, following the American Civil War. He maintained a medical practice, but spent much of his time on political journalism for a Parisian newspaper, Le Temps. He taught French in Great Barrington, Massachusetts, and also taught and rode horseback at a private girls' school in Stamford, Connecticut, where he would meet his future wife. During this time, he joined French exile clubs in New York that were opposing the imperial regime.

As part of his journalistic activity, Clemenceau covered the country's recovery following the Civil War, the workings of American democracy, and the racial questions related to the end of slavery. From his time in America, he retained a strong faith in American democratic ideals as opposed to France's imperial regime, as well as a sense of political compromise that later would become a hallmark of his political career.

== Marriage and family ==
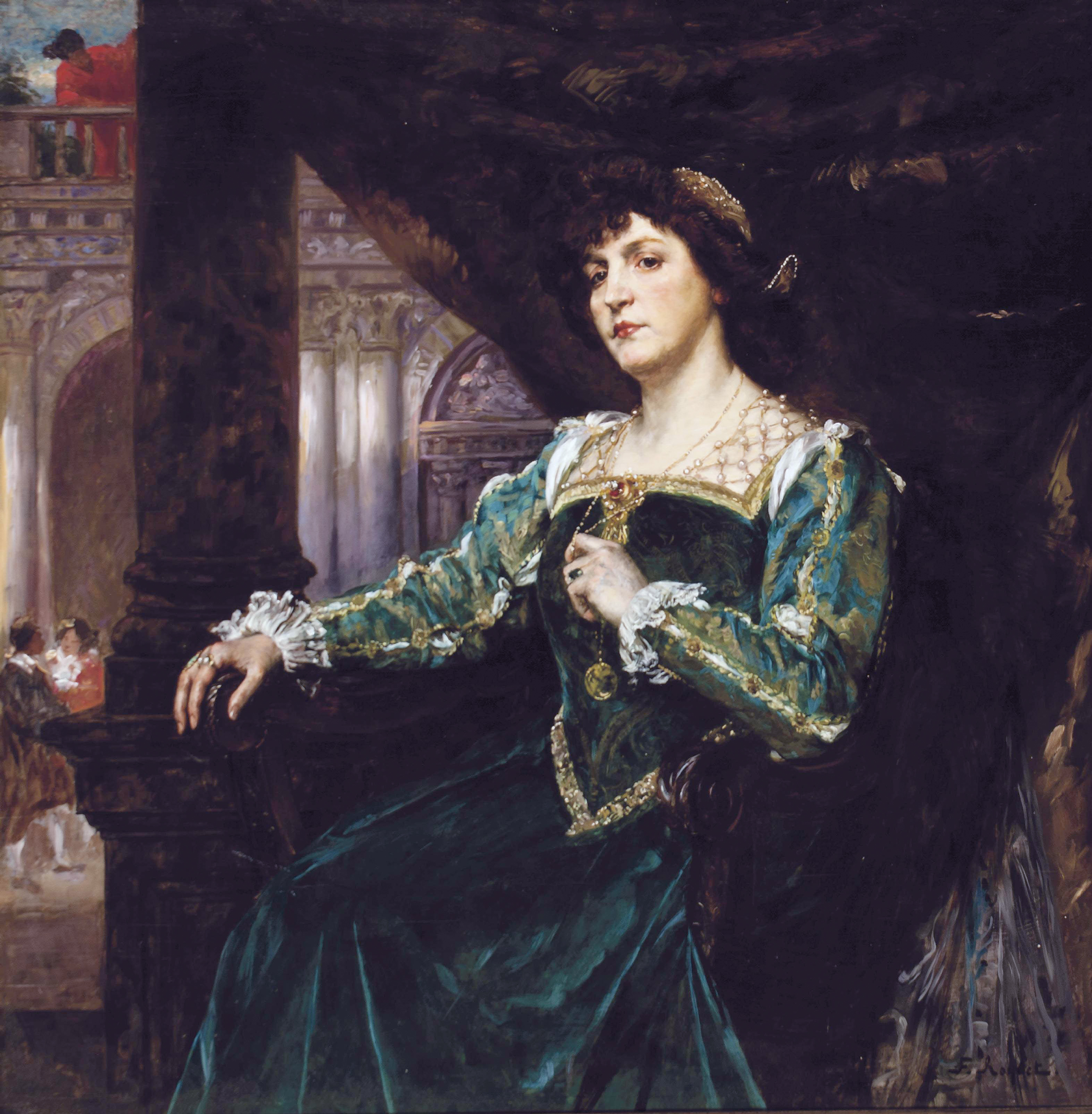
Mary Clemenceau in period costume. Portrait by Ferdinand Roybet

On 23 June 1869, he married Mary Eliza Plummer (1849–1922), in New York City. She had attended the school where he taught horseback riding and was one of his students. She was the daughter of Harriet A. Taylor and William Kelly Plummer.

Following their marriage, the Clemenceaus moved to France. They had three children together, Madeleine (born in 1870), Thérèse (1872) and Michel (1873).

Although Clemenceau had many mistresses, when his wife took a tutor of their children as her lover, Clemenceau had her put in jail for two weeks and then sent her back to the United States on a steamer in third class. The marriage ended in a contentious divorce in 1891. He obtained custody of their children. He then had his wife stripped of French nationality.

== Beginning of the Third Republic ==
Clemenceau had returned to Paris after the French defeat at the Battle of Sedan in 1870 during the Franco-Prussian War and the fall of the Second French Empire. After returning to medical practice as a physician in Vendée, he was appointed mayor of the 18th arrondissement of Paris, including Montmartre, and he also was elected to the National Assembly for the 18th arrondissement. When the Paris Commune seized power in March 1871, he tried unsuccessfully to find a compromise between the more radical leaders of the Commune and the more conservative French government. The Commune declared that he had no legal authority to be mayor and seized the city hall of the 18th arrondissement. He ran for election to the Paris Commune council, but received fewer than eight hundred votes and took no part in its governance. He was in Bordeaux when the commune was suppressed by the French Army in May 1871.

After the fall of the commune, he was elected to the Paris municipal council on 23 July 1871 for the Clignancourt quarter and retained his seat until 1876. He first held the offices of secretary and vice-president, then he became president in 1875.

=== Chamber of Deputies ===
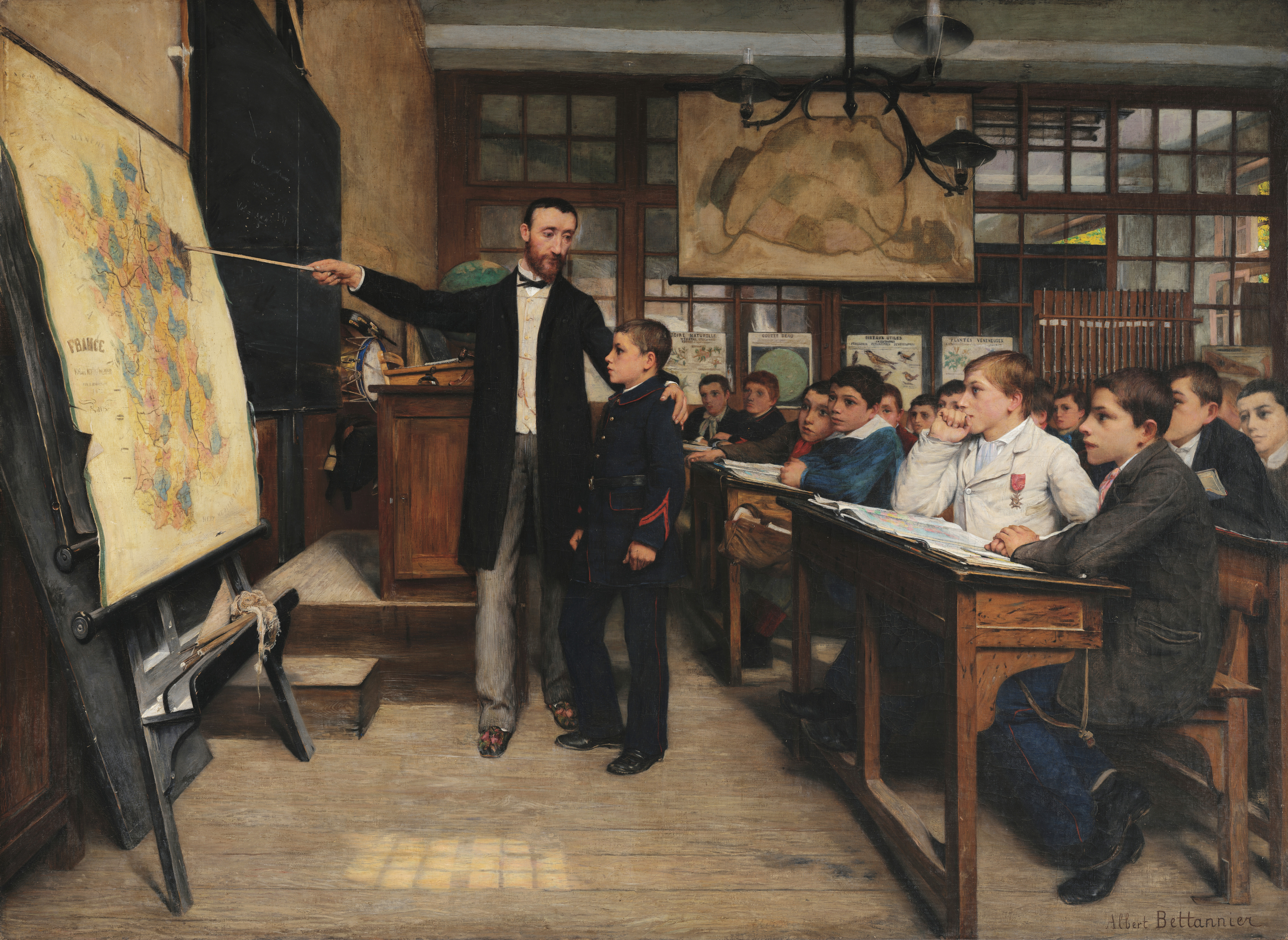
An 1887 painting of a French child being taught about the "lost" province of Alsace-Lorraine in the aftermath of the Franco-Prussian War dramatizes the main goal of Clemenceau and the French in general, to regain those provinces

In 1876, Clemenceau stood for the Chamber of Deputies (which replaced the National Assembly in 1875) and was elected for the 18th arrondissement. He joined the far left and his energy and mordant eloquence speedily made him the leader of the radical section. In 1877, after the Crisis of 16 May 1877, he was one of the republican majority who denounced the ministry of the Duc de Broglie. Clemenceau led resistance to the anti-republican policy of which the incident of 16 May was a manifestation. In 1879, his demand for the indictment of the Broglie ministry brought him prominence.

From 1876 to 1880, Clemenceau was one of the main defenders of the general amnesty of thousands of Communards, members of the revolutionary government of the 1871 Paris Commune who had been deported to New Caledonia. Along with other radicals and figures such as poet and then-Senator Victor Hugo, as well as a growing number of republicans, he supported several unsuccessful proposals. Finally a general amnesty was adopted on 11 July 1880. The "reconciliation" envisaged by Clemenceau could begin, as the remaining deported Communards returned to France, including his friend Louise Michel.

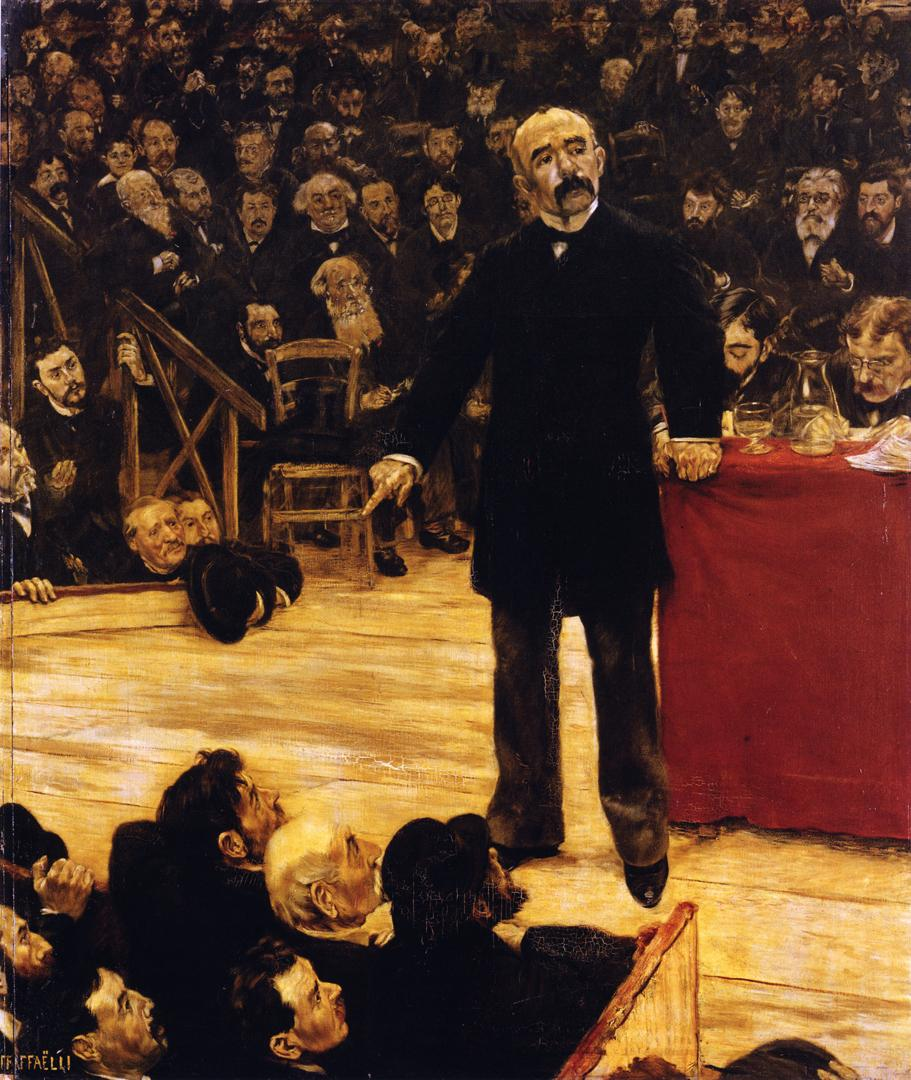
Clemenceau giving a speech in the Parisian Fernando Circus, painting by Jean-François Raffaëlli, 1883

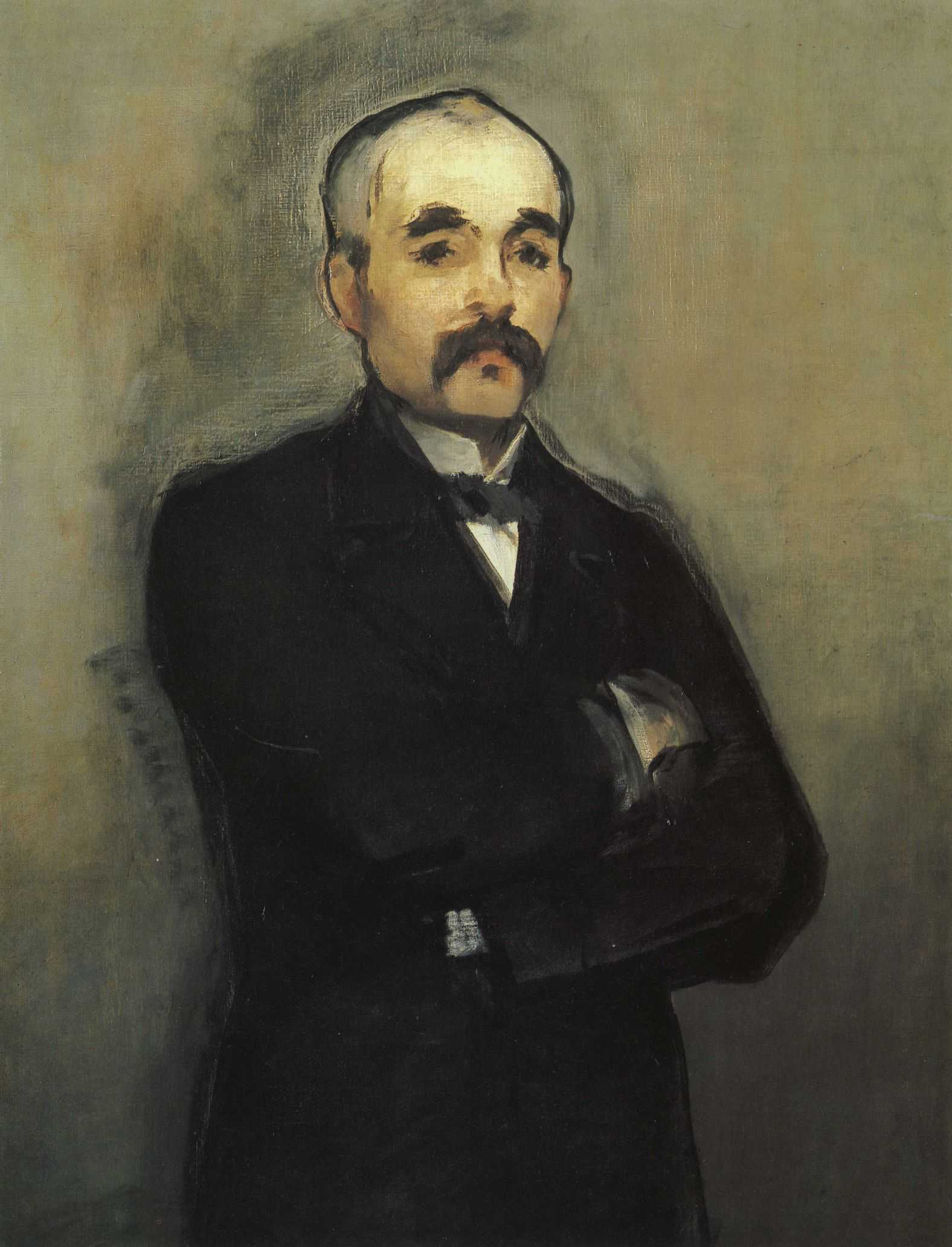
Portrait of Georges Clemenceau, painting by Édouard Manet, c. 1879–80

In 1880, Clemenceau started his newspaper, La Justice, which became the principal organ of Parisian Radicalism. From this time, throughout the presidency of Jules Grévy (1879–1887), he became widely known as a political critic and destroyer of ministries (le Tombeur de ministères) who avoided taking office himself. Leading the far left in the Chamber of Deputies, he was an active opponent of the colonial policy of Prime Minister Jules Ferry, which he opposed on moral grounds and also as a form of diversion from the more important goal of "Revenge against Germany" for the annexation of Alsace and Lorraine after the Franco-Prussian War. In 1885, his criticism of the conduct of the Sino-French War contributed strongly to the fall of the Ferry cabinet that year.

During the French legislative elections of 1885, he advocated a strong radical programme and was returned both for his old seat in Paris and for the Var, district of Draguignan. He chose to represent the latter in the Chamber of Deputies. Refusing to form a ministry to replace the one he had overthrown, he supported the right in keeping Prime Minister Charles de Freycinet in power in 1886 and was responsible for the inclusion of Georges Ernest Boulanger in the Freycinet cabinet as war minister. When General Boulanger revealed himself as an ambitious pretender, Clemenceau withdrew his support and became a vigorous opponent of the heterogeneous Boulangist movement, although the radical press continued to patronize the general.

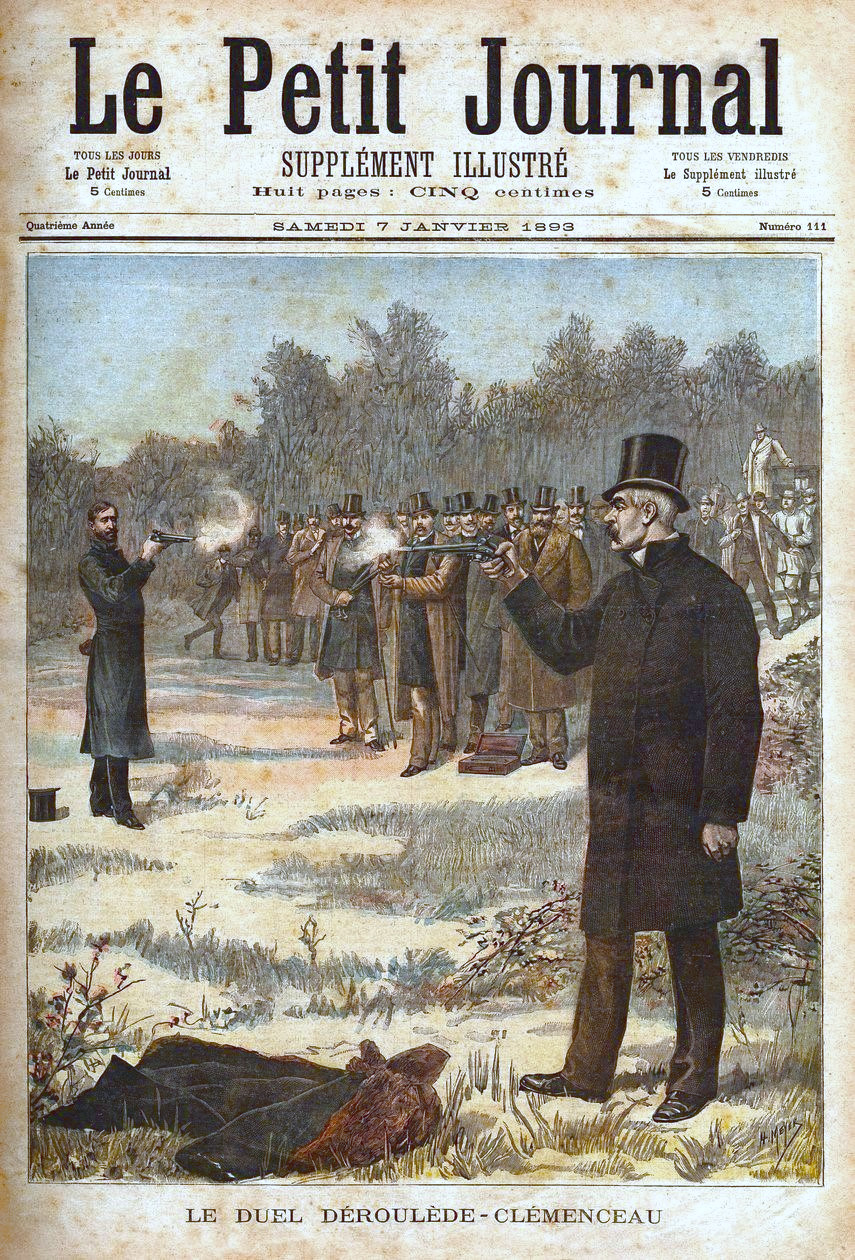
Duel between Clemenceau and Paul Déroulède

By his exposure of the Wilson scandal, and by his personal plain speaking, Clemenceau contributed largely to the resignation of Jules Grévy from the presidency of France in 1887. He had declined Grévy's request to form a cabinet upon the downfall of the cabinet of Maurice Rouvier by advising his followers not to vote for Charles Floquet, Jules Ferry, nor Charles de Freycinet, Clemenceau was primarily responsible for the election of an "outsider", Marie François Sadi Carnot, as president.

The split in the Radical Party over Boulangism weakened his hand and its collapse meant that moderate republicans did not need his help. A further misfortune occurred in the Panama affair, as Clemenceau's relations with the businessman and politician Cornelius Herz led to his being included in the general suspicion. In response to accusations of corruption levelled by the nationalist politician Paul Déroulède, Clemenceau fought a duel with him on 23 December 1892. Six shots were discharged, but neither participant was injured.

Clemenceau remained the leading spokesman for French radicalism, but his hostility to the Franco-Russian Alliance so increased his unpopularity that in the French legislative elections of 1893, he was defeated for his seat in the Chamber of Deputies after having held it continuously since 1876.

=== Dreyfus Affair ===
For nearly a decade after his 1893 defeat, Clemenceau confined his political activities to journalism. His career was further clouded by the long-drawn-out Dreyfus case, in which he took an active part as a supporter of Émile Zola and an opponent of the anti-Semitic and nationalist campaigns. In all, during the affair Clemenceau published 665 articles defending Dreyfus.

On 13 January 1898, Clemenceau published Émile Zola's J'Accuse...! on the front page of the Paris daily newspaper, L'Aurore, of which he was owner and editor. The controversial article, written in the form of an open letter to Félix Faure, the president of France, would become a famous part of the Dreyfus Affair.

In 1900, he withdrew from La Justice to found a weekly review, Le Bloc, to which he practically was the sole contributor. The publication of Le Bloc lasted until 15 March 1902. On 6 April 1902, he was elected senator for the Var district of Draguignan, although he had previously called for the suppression of the French Senate, as he considered it a strong-house of conservatism. He served as the senator for Draguignan until 1920.

Clemenceau sat with the Independent Radicals in the Senate and moderated his positions, although he still vigorously supported the Radical-Socialist ministry of Prime Minister Émile Combes, who spearheaded the anti-clericalist republican struggle. In June 1903, he undertook the direction of L'Aurore, the journal that he had founded. In it, he led the campaign to revisit the Dreyfus affair and to create a separation of church and state in France. The latter was implemented by the 1905 French law on the Separation of the Churches and the State.

Another cause of social justice Clemenceau was involved in was supporting the Young Turks in their struggle against the Hamidian government. When French authorities elected to shutter Ahmet Rıza's Meşveret, many journalists, principally Clemenceau, choose to support his efforts against Yıldız's lawsuit. The French censors, heeding Clemenceau's mission for the protection of free speech, chose to only ban the Turkish version of the newspaper, with the French supplemental being allowed to continue publication.

== Prime Minister of France (1906-1909) ==
In March 1906, the ministry of Maurice Rouvier fell as a result of civil disturbances provoked by the implementation of the law on the separation of church and state and the victory of radicals in the French legislative elections of 1906. The new ministry of Ferdinand Sarrien appointed Clemenceau as Minister of the Interior. On a domestic level, Clemenceau reformed the French police forces and ordered repressive policies toward the workers' movement. He supported the formation of scientific police by Alphonse Bertillon and founded the Brigades mobiles ("mobile squads") led by Célestin Hennion. These squads were nicknamed Brigades du Tigre ("The Tiger's Brigades") after Clemenceau, who was nicknamed "The Tiger".

The miners' strike in the Pas de Calais, after the Courrières mine disaster resulted in the death of more than one thousand persons, threatened widespread disorder on 1 May 1906. Clemenceau ordered the military against the strikers and also repressed the wine growers strike in Languedoc-Roussillon. His actions alienated the French Section of the Workers' International (SFIO, the socialist party). He definitively broke with the SFIO in his notable reply in the Chamber of Deputies to SFIO leader Jean Jaurès in June 1906. Clemenceau's speech positioned him as the strong man of the day in French politics; when the Sarrien ministry resigned in October, Clemenceau became premier.

After a proposal by the deputy Paul Dussaussoy for limited women's suffrage in local elections, Clemenceau published a pamphlet in 1907 in which he declared that if women were given the vote France would return to the Middle Ages.

As the revolt of the Languedoc winegrowers developed Clemenceau at first dismissed the complaints, then sent in troops to keep the peace in June 1907.

During 1907 and 1908, he led the development of a new Entente cordiale with Britain, which gave France a successful role in European politics. Difficulties with Germany and criticism by the Socialist party in connection with the handling of the First Moroccan Crisis in 1905–06 were settled at the Algeciras Conference.

Clemenceau's ministry fell on 20 July 1909. During a debate in the Chamber of Deputies on the state of the navy, he exchanged bitter words with Théophile Delcassé. Refusing to respond to Delcassé's technical questions, Clemenceau resigned after his motion for the order of the day was defeated. He was succeeded as premier by Aristide Briand, with a reconstructed cabinet.

Between 1909 and 1912, Clemenceau dedicated his time to travel, conferences, and the treatment of his illness. He went to South America in 1910, traveling to Brazil, Uruguay, and Argentina (where he went as far as Santa Ana (Tucuman) in northwest Argentina). There, he was amazed by the influence of French culture and of the French Revolution on local elites.

He published the first issue of the Journal du Var on 10 April 1910. Three years later, on 6 May 1913, he founded the newspaper L'Homme libre ("The Free Man") in Paris, for which he wrote a daily editorial. In these media, Clemenceau focused increasingly on foreign policy and condemned the anti-militarism of the Socialists.

A number of progressive reforms were carried out during Clemenceau's first ministry. A law of March 1907 reorganized the industrial tribunals, providing for (as noted by one study) “the election of their members (employer and employer representatives) and prescribes equal representation.” A law of July 1907 allowed married women (as noted by one study) “to freely dispose of the salary from their professional activity.” A law designed to facilitate working-class home ownership was introduced in 1908, and in April that year a decree was issued prescribing special regulations (as noted by one study) “for the hygiene of industries in which workmen are exposed to lead poisoning,”, while a law concerning health and safety in relation to white lead was promulgated on July the 20th 1909.

=== First World War ===
At the outbreak of World War I in France in August 1914, Clemenceau's newspaper was one of the first to be censored by the government. It was suspended from 29 September 1914 to 7 October. In response, Clemenceau changed the newspaper's name to L'Homme enchaîné ("The Chained Man") and criticized the government for its lack of transparency and its ineffectiveness, while defending the patriotic union sacrée against the German Empire.

In spite of the censorship imposed by the French government on Clemenceau's journalism at the beginning of World War I, he still wielded considerable political influence. As soon as the war started, Clemenceau advised Interior Minister Louis Malvy to invoke Carnet B, a list of known and suspected subversives who were supposed to be arrested upon mobilisation, in order to prevent the collapse of popular support for a war effort. The Prefect of Police gave the same advice, but the government did not follow it. In the end, 80% of the 2,501 people listed on Carnet B as subversives volunteered for service. In autumn 1914, Clemenceau declined to join the government of national unity as justice minister.

He was a vehement critic of the wartime French government, asserting that it was not doing enough to win the war. His stance was driven by a will to regain the province of Alsace-Lorraine, a view shared by public opinion. The autumn of 1917 saw the disastrous Italian defeat at the Battle of Caporetto, the Bolshevik seizure of power in Russia, and rumours that former Prime Minister Joseph Caillaux and Interior Minister Malvy had engaged in treason. Prime Minister Paul Painlevé was inclined to open negotiations with Germany. Clemenceau argued that even German restitution of Alsace-Lorraine and the liberation of Belgium would not be enough to justify France abandoning her allies. This forced Alexandre Ribot and Aristide Briand (both the previous two prime ministers, of whom the latter was by far the more powerful politician who had been approached by a German diplomat) to agree in public that there would be no separate peace. For many years, Clemenceau was blamed for having blocked a possible compromise peace, but it is now clear from examination of German documents that Germany had no serious intention of handing over Alsace-Lorraine. The prominence of his opposition made him the best known critic and the last man standing when the others had failed. "Messieurs, les Allemands sont toujours à Noyon" (Gentlemen, the Germans are still at Noyon) wrote Clemenceau's paper endlessly.

=== Second term as prime minister ===
In November 1917, at one of the darkest hours for the French war effort in World War I, Clemenceau was appointed to the prime ministership. Unlike his predecessors, he discouraged internal disagreement and called for peace among the senior politicians.

==== 1917: return to power ====
Clemenceau governed from the Ministry of War on Rue Saint-Dominique. Almost his first act as prime minister was to relieve General Maurice Sarrail from his command of the Salonika front. This was the main topic of discussion at the first meeting of the war committee on 6 December, at which Clemenceau stated, "Sarrail cannot remain there". The reason for Sarrail's dismissal was his links with the socialist politicians Joseph Caillaux and Louis Malvy (at that time suspected of treasonable contacts with the Germans)

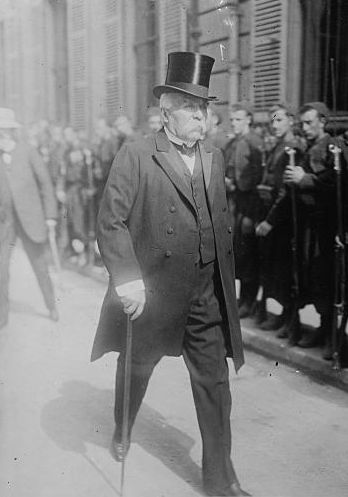
Clemenceau as prime minister of France

Churchill later wrote that Clemenceau "looked like a wild animal pacing to and fro behind bars" in front of "an assembly which would have done anything to avoid putting him there, but, having put him there, felt they must obey".

When Clemenceau became prime minister in 1917 victory seemed to be elusive. There was little activity on the western front because it was believed that there should be limited attacks until the American support arrived. At this time, Italy was on the defensive, Russia virtually had stopped fighting – and it was believed that they would be making a separate peace with Germany. At home, the government had to deal with increasing demonstrations against the war, a scarcity of resources, and air raids that were causing huge physical damage to Paris as well as undermining the morale of its citizens. It also was believed that many politicians secretly wanted peace. It was a challenging situation for Clemenceau; after years of criticizing other men during the war, he suddenly found himself in a position of supreme power. He was isolated politically, however. He did not have close links with any parliamentary leaders (especially after he had antagonized them so relentlessly during the course of the war) and so, had to rely on himself and his own circle of friends.

Clemenceau's assumption of power meant little to the men in the trenches at first. They thought of him as "just another politician", and the monthly assessment of troop morale found that only a minority found comfort in his appointment. Slowly, however, as time passed, the confidence he inspired in a few, began to grow throughout all the fighting men. They were encouraged by his many visits to the trenches. This confidence began to spread from the trenches to the home front and it was said, "We believed in Clemenceau rather in the way that our ancestors believed in Joan of Arc." After years of criticism against the French army for its conservatism and Catholicism, Clemenceau would need help to get along with the military leaders to achieve a sound strategic plan. He nominated General Henri Mordacq to be his military chief of staff. Mordacq helped to inspire trust and mutual respect from the army to the government which proved essential to the final victory.

Clemenceau also was well received by the media, because they felt that France was in need of strong leadership. It was widely recognized that throughout the war he was never discouraged and never stopped believing that France could achieve total victory. There were skeptics, however, who believed that Clemenceau, like other war-time leaders, would have a short time in office. It was said, "Like everyone else ... Clemenceau will not last long – only long enough to clean up [the war]."

==== 1918: crackdown ====
As the military situation worsened in early 1918, Clemenceau continued to support the policy of total war – "We present ourselves before you with the single thought of total war" – and the policy of "la guerre jusqu'au bout" (war until the end). His speech of 8 March advocating this policy was so effective that it left a vivid impression on Winston Churchill, who would make similar speeches upon becoming British prime minister in 1940. Clemenceau's war policy encompassed the promise of victory with justice, loyalty to the fighting men, and immediate and severe punishment of crimes against France.

Joseph Caillaux, a former French prime minister, disagreed with Clemenceau's policies. He wanted to surrender to Germany and negotiate a peace, thus Clemenceau viewed Caillaux as a threat to national security. Unlike previous ministers, Clemenceau moved against Caillaux publicly. As a result, a parliamentary committee decided that Caillaux would be arrested and imprisoned for three years. Clemenceau believed, in the words of Jean Ybarnégaray, that Caillaux's crime "was not to have believed in victory [and] to have gambled on his nation's defeat".

The arrest of Caillaux and others raised the issue of Clemenceau's harshness, who in turn argued that the only powers he assumed were those necessary for winning the war. The many trials and arrests aroused great public excitement. These trials, far from making the public fear the government, inspired confidence, as the public felt that for the first time in the war, action was being taken and they were being firmly governed. The claims that Clemenceau's "firm government" was a dictatorship found little support. Clemenceau was still held accountable to the people and media. He relaxed censorship on political views as he believed that newspapers had the right to criticize political figures: "The right to insult members of the government is inviolable."

In 1918, Clemenceau thought that France should adopt Woodrow Wilson's Fourteen Points, mainly because of its point that called for the return of Alsace-Lorraine to France. This meant that victory would fulfil the war aim that was crucial for the French public. Clemenceau was sceptical about some other points, however, including those concerning the League of Nations, as he believed that the latter could succeed only in a utopian society.

==== 1918: German spring offensive ====
On 21 March 1918, the Germans began their great spring offensive. The allies were caught off guard and a gap was created in the British and French lines that risked handing over access to Paris to the Germans. This defeat cemented Clemenceau's belief, and that of the other allies, that a coordinated, unified command was the best option. It was decided that Ferdinand Foch would be appointed as "generalissimo".

The German line continued to advance and Clemenceau believed that the fall of Paris could not be ruled out. Public opinions arose that if "the Tiger", as well as Foch and Philippe Pétain stayed in power for even another week, France would be lost and that a government headed by Aristide Briand would be beneficial to France, because he would make peace with Germany on advantageous terms. Clemenceau adamantly opposed these opinions and he gave an inspirational speech in the Chamber of Deputies; the chamber subsequently voted their confidence in him by 377 votes to 110.

As the allied counter-offensives began to push the Germans back, it became clear that the Germans could no longer win the war. Although they still occupied vast amounts of French territory, they did not have sufficient resources and manpower to continue their attack. As countries allied to Germany began to ask for an armistice, it was obvious that Germany would soon follow. On 11 November 1918, an armistice with Germany was signed. Clemenceau was embraced in the streets and attracted many admiring crowds.

== President of 1919 Paris Peace Conference ==
To settle the international political issues left over from the conclusion of World War I, it was decided that a peace conference would be held in Paris, France. Famously, the Treaty of Versailles between Germany and the Allied Powers to conclude the conflict was signed in the Palace of Versailles, but the deliberations on which it was based were conducted in Paris, hence the name given to the meeting of the victorious heads of state that produced the treaties signed with the defeated powers: the Paris Peace Conference of 1919. On 13 December 1918, United States president Woodrow Wilson received an enthusiastic welcome in France. His Fourteen Points and the concept of a League of Nations had made a big impact on the war-weary French.

The powers agreed that since the conference was being held in France, Clemenceau would be the most appropriate president. Also, he spoke both English and French, the official languages of the conference. Clemenceau had an unassailable position of full control of the French delegation. Parliament gave him a vote of confidence on 30 December 1918, by a vote of 398 to 93. The rules of the conference allowed France five plenipotentiaries. They became Clemenceau and four others who were his pawns. He excluded all military men, especially Foch. He excluded the president of France, Raymond Poincaré, keeping him in the dark on the progress of negotiations. He excluded all parliamentary deputies, saying he would negotiate the treaty and it would be parliament's duty to vote it up or down, after it was finished.

=== Attempted assassination ===
On 19 February 1919, as Clemenceau was leaving his apartment, a man fired several shots at the car. Clemenceau's assailant, anarchist Émile Cottin, was nearly lynched. Clemenceau's assistant found him pale, but conscious. "They shot me in the back", Clemenceau told him. "They didn't even dare to attack me from the front." One bullet hit Clemenceau between the ribs, just missing his vital organs. Too dangerous to remove, the bullet remained with him for the rest of his life.

Clemenceau often joked about the "assassin's" bad marksmanship – "We have just won the most terrible war in history, yet here is a Frenchman who misses his target six out of seven times at point-blank range. Of course this fellow must be punished for the careless use of a dangerous weapon and for poor marksmanship. I suggest that he be locked up for eight years, with intensive training in a shooting gallery."

=== Rhineland and the Saar ===
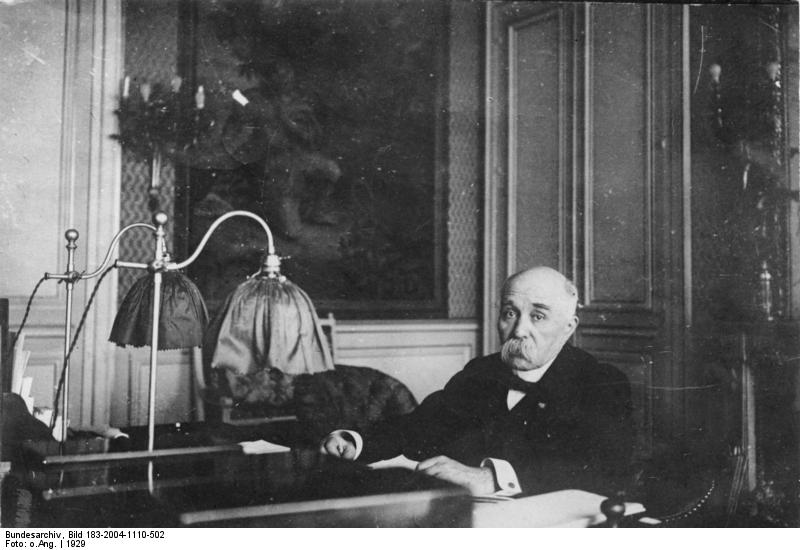
Clemenceau in his office, 1929

When Clemenceau returned to the Council of Ten on 1 March, he found that little had changed. One issue that had not changed at all was the long-running dispute over France's eastern frontier and control of the German Rhineland. Clemenceau believed that Germany's possession of this territory left France without a natural frontier in the east and thus, was vulnerable to invasion. The British ambassador reported in December 1918 on Clemenceau's views on the future of the Rhineland: "He said that the Rhine was a natural boundary of Gaul and Germany and that it ought to be made the German boundary now, the territory between the Rhine and the French frontier being made into an Independent State whose neutrality should be guaranteed by the great powers."

Finally, the issue was resolved when Lloyd George and Woodrow Wilson guaranteed immediate military assistance if Germany attacked without provocation. It also was decided that the allies would occupy the territory for fifteen years, and that Germany could never rearm the area. Lloyd George insisted on a clause allowing for the early withdrawal of allied troops if the Germans fulfilled the treaty; Clemenceau inserted Article 429 into the treaty that permitted allied occupation beyond the fifteen years if adequate guarantees for allied security against unprovoked aggression were not met. This was in case the U.S. Senate refused to ratify the Treaty of Guarantee, thereby making null and void the British guarantee as well, since that was dependent on the Americans being part of it. This is, in fact, what did occur. Article 429 ensured that a refusal of the U.S. Senate to ratify the treaties of guarantee would not weaken them.

President Poincaré and Marshal Ferdinand Foch both pressed repeatedly for an autonomous Rhineland state. Foch thought the Treaty of Versailles was too lenient on Germany, stating "This is not peace. It is an armistice for twenty years." At a cabinet meeting on 25 April Foch spoke against the deal Clemenceau had brokered and pushed for a separate Rhineland. On 28 April Poincaré sent Clemenceau a long letter detailing why he thought allied occupation should continue until Germany had paid all her reparations. Clemenceau replied that the alliance with America and Britain was of more value than an isolated France that held onto the Rhineland: "In fifteen years I will be dead, but if you do me the honour of visiting my tomb, you will be able to say that the Germans have not fulfilled all the clauses of the treaty, and that we are still on the Rhine."

Clemenceau said to Lloyd George in June, "We need a barrier behind which, in the years to come, our people can work in security to rebuild its ruins. The barrier is the Rhine. I must take national feelings into account. That does not mean that I am afraid of losing office. I am quite indifferent on that point. But I will not, by giving up the occupation, do something which will break the willpower of our people." Later, he said to Jean Martel, "The policy of Foch and Poincaré was bad in principle. It was a policy no Frenchman, no republican Frenchman could accept for a moment, except in the hope of obtaining other guarantees, other advantages. We leave that sort of thing to Bismarck."

There was increasing discontent among Clemenceau, Lloyd George, and Woodrow Wilson about slow progress and information leaks surrounding the Council of Ten. They began to meet in a smaller group, called the Council of Four, Vittorio Orlando of Italy being the fourth, although less weighty, member. This offered greater privacy and security and increased the efficiency of the decision-making process. Another major issue that the Council of Four discussed was the future of the German Saar region. Clemenceau believed that France was entitled to the region and its coal mines after Germany deliberately damaged the coal mines in northern France. Wilson, however, resisted the French claim so firmly that Clemenceau accused him of being "pro-German". Lloyd George came to a compromise; the coal mines were given to France and the territory placed under French administration for 15 years, after which a vote would determine whether the region would rejoin Germany.

Although Clemenceau had little knowledge of the defunct Austro-Hungarian Empire, he supported the causes of its smaller ethnic groups and his adamant stance led to the stringent terms in the Treaty of Trianon that dismantled Hungary. Rather than recognizing territories of the Austro-Hungarian Empire solely within the principles of self-determination, Clemenceau sought to weaken Hungary, just as Germany was, and to remove the threat of such a large power within Central Europe. The entire Czechoslovak state was seen a potential buffer from Communism and this encompassed majority Hungarian territories.

=== Reparations ===
Clemenceau was not experienced in the fields of economics or finance, and as John Maynard Keynes pointed out, "he did not trouble his head to understand either the Indemnity or [France's] overwhelming financial difficulties", but he was under strong public and parliamentary pressure to make Germany's reparations bill as large as possible.

Generally, it was agreed that Germany should not pay more than it could afford, but the estimates of what it could afford varied greatly. Figures ranged between £2,000 million and £20,000 million. Clemenceau realised that any compromise would anger both the French and British citizens and that the only option was to establish a reparations commission that would examine Germany's capacity for reparations. This meant that the French government was not directly involved in the issue of reparations.

=== Defence of the treaty ===
The Treaty of Versailles was signed on 28 June 1919. Clemenceau now had to defend the treaty against critics who viewed the compromises he had negotiated as inadequate for French national interests. The French Parliament debated the treaty and Louis Barthou on 24 September claimed that the U.S. Senate would not vote for the Treaty of Guarantee or the Treaty of Versailles and therefore, it would have been wiser to have the Rhine as a frontier. Clemenceau replied that he was sure the Senate would ratify both and that he had inserted Article 429 into the treaty, providing for "new arrangements concerning the Rhine". This interpretation of Article 429 was disputed by Barthou.

Clemenceau's main speech on the treaty was delivered on 25 September. He said that he knew the treaty was not perfect, but that the war had been fought by a coalition and therefore, the treaty would express the lowest common denominator of those involved. He claimed criticisms of the details of the treaty were misleading; that critics should look at the treaty as a whole and see how they could benefit from it:

The treaty, with all its complex clauses, will only be worth what you are worth; it will be what you make it ... What you are going to vote to-day is not even a beginning, it is a beginning of a beginning. The ideas it contains will grow and bear fruit. You have won the power to impose them on a defeated Germany. We are told that she will revive. All the more reason not to show her that we fear her ... M. Marin went to the heart of the question, when he turned to us and said in despairing tones, "You have reduced us to a policy of vigilance." Yes, M. Marin, do you think that one could make a treaty which would do away with the need for vigilance among the nations of Europe who only yesterday were pouring out their blood in battle? Life is a perpetual struggle in war, as in peace ... That struggle cannot be avoided. Yes, we must have vigilance, we must have a great deal of vigilance. I cannot say for how many years, perhaps I should say for how many centuries, the crisis which has begun will continue. Yes, this treaty will bring us burdens, troubles, miseries, difficulties, and that will continue for long years.

The Chamber of Deputies ratified the treaty by 372 votes to 53, with the Senate voting unanimously for its ratification. On 11 October Clemenceau gave his last parliamentary speech, addressed to the Senate. He said that any attempt to partition Germany would be self-defeating and that France must find a way of living with sixty million Germans. He also said that the bourgeoisie, like the aristocracy before them in the ancien régime, had failed as a ruling class. It was now the turn of the working class to rule. He advocated national unity and a demographic revolution: "The treaty does not state that France will have many children, but it is the first thing that should have been written there. For if France does not have large families, it will be in vain that you put all the finest clauses in the treaty, that you take away all the Germans guns, France will be lost because there will be no more French".

== Domestic policies ==
Clemenceau's final tenure as prime minister witnessed the implementation of various reforms aimed at regulating the hours of labour. A general eight-hour day law passed in April 1919 amending the French Labour Code, and in June that year, existing legislation concerning the duration of the working day in the mining industry was amended by extending the eight-hour day to all classes of workers, "whether employed underground or on the surface". Under a previous law of December 1913, the eight-hour limit had only applied to workers employed underground. In August 1919, a similar limit was introduced for all those employed in French vessels. Another law passed in 1919 (which came into operation in October 1920) prohibited employment in bakeries between the hours of 10 P.M. and 4 A.M.; this law is sometimes credited as the cause of the popularization if not the development of the baguette as a dominant form of bread in France, and the earliest written references to a "baguette" as a style of bread date from August 1920. A decree of May 1919 introduced the eight-hour day for workers on trams, railways, and in inland waterways, and a second of June 1919 extended this provision to the state railways. In April 1919, an enabling act was approved for an eight-hour day and a six-day work week, although farm workers were excluded from the act.

== 1920 Presidential bid ==
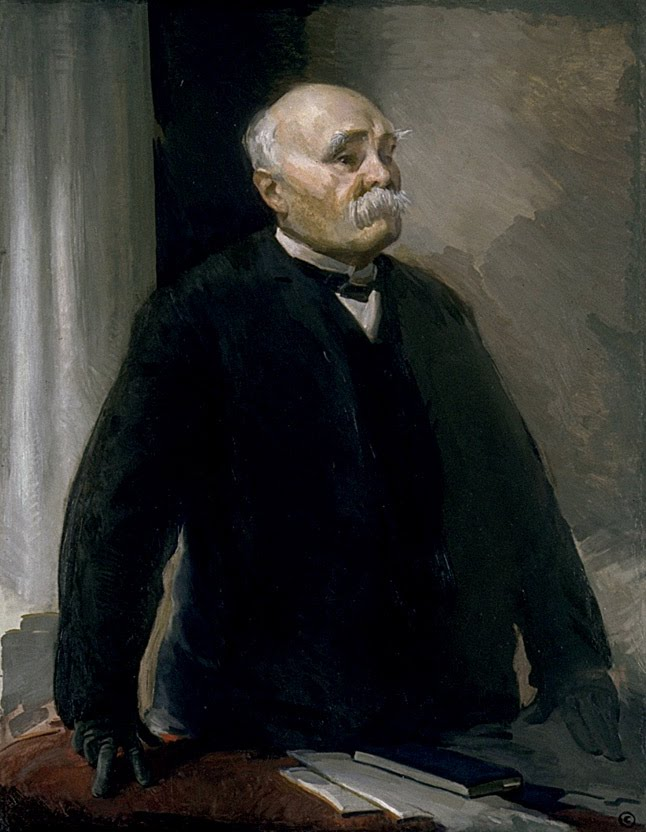
Clemenceau by Cecilia Beaux (1920)

In 1919, France adopted a new electoral system and the legislative election gave the National Bloc (a coalition of right-wing parties) a majority. Clemenceau only intervened once in the election campaign, delivering a speech on 4 November at Strasbourg, praising the manifesto and men of the National Bloc and he urged that the victory in the war needed to be safeguarded by vigilance. In private he was concerned at this huge swing to the right.

His friend, Georges Mandel, urged Clemenceau to stand for the presidency in the upcoming election and on 15 January 1920 he let Mandel announce that he would be prepared to serve if elected. However, Clemenceau did not intend to campaign for the post, instead he wished to be chosen by acclaim as a national symbol. The preliminary meeting of the republican caucus (a forerunner to the vote in the National Assembly) chose Paul Deschanel instead of Clemenceau by a vote of 408 to 389. In response, Clemenceau refused to be put forward for the vote in the National Assembly because he did not want to win by a small majority, but by a near-unanimous vote. Only then, he claimed, could he negotiate with confidence with the allies.

In his last speech to the cabinet on 18 January he said, "We must show the world the extent of our victory, and we must take up the mentality and habits of a victorious people, which once more takes its place at the head of Europe. But all that will now be placed in jeopardy ... It will take less time and less thought to destroy the edifice so patiently and painfully erected than it took to complete it. Poor France. The mistakes have begun already."

== Last years ==
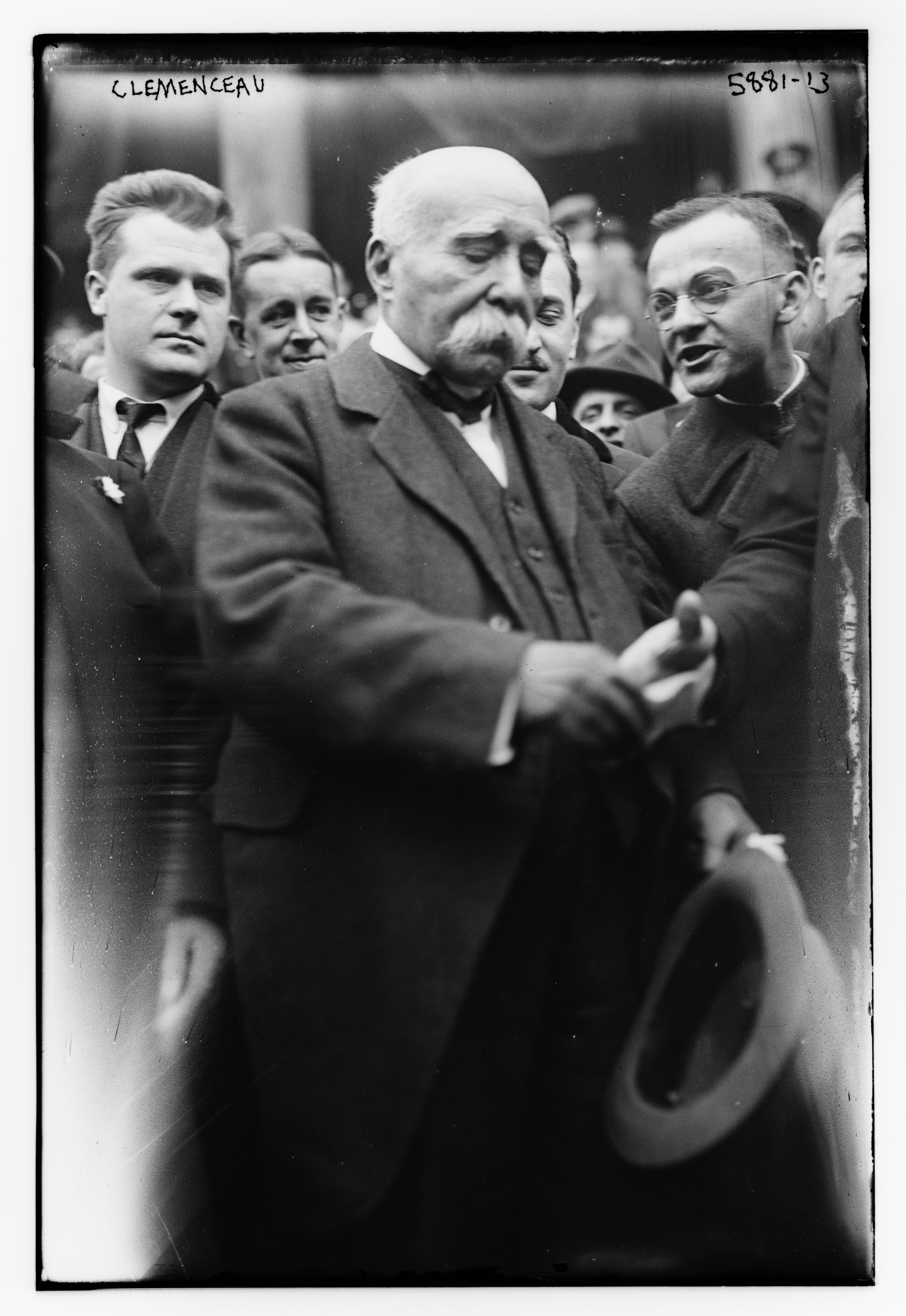
Clemenceau visited the United States in 1922

Clemenceau resigned as prime minister as soon as the presidential election was held (17 January 1920) and took no further part in politics. In private, he condemned the unilateral occupation by French troops of the German city of Frankfurt in 1920 and said if he had been in power, he would have persuaded the British to join it.

He took a holiday in Egypt and the Sudan from February to April 1920, then embarked for the Far East in September, returning to France in March 1921. In June, he visited England and received an honorary degree from the University of Oxford. He met Lloyd George and said to him that after the armistice he had become the enemy of France. Lloyd George replied, "Well, was not that always our traditional policy?" He was joking, but after reflection, Clemenceau took it seriously. After Lloyd George's fall from power in 1922 Clemenceau remarked, "As for France, it is a real enemy who disappears. Lloyd George did not hide it: at my last visit to London he cynically admitted it".

In late 1922, Clemenceau gave a lecture tour in major cities of the American northeast. He defended the policy of France, including war debts and reparations, and condemned American isolationism. He was well received and attracted large audiences, but America's policy remained unchanged. On 9 August 1926, he wrote an open letter to US President Calvin Coolidge that argued against France paying all its war debts: "France is not for sale, even to her friends". This appeal went unheard.

He condemned Poincaré's occupation of the Ruhr in 1923 as an undoing of the entente between France and Britain.

He wrote two short biographies, one of the Greek orator Demosthenes and one of the French painter Claude Monet. He also penned a huge two-volume tome, covering philosophy, history, and science, entitled Au Soir de la Pensée. Writing this occupied most of his time between 1923 and 1927.

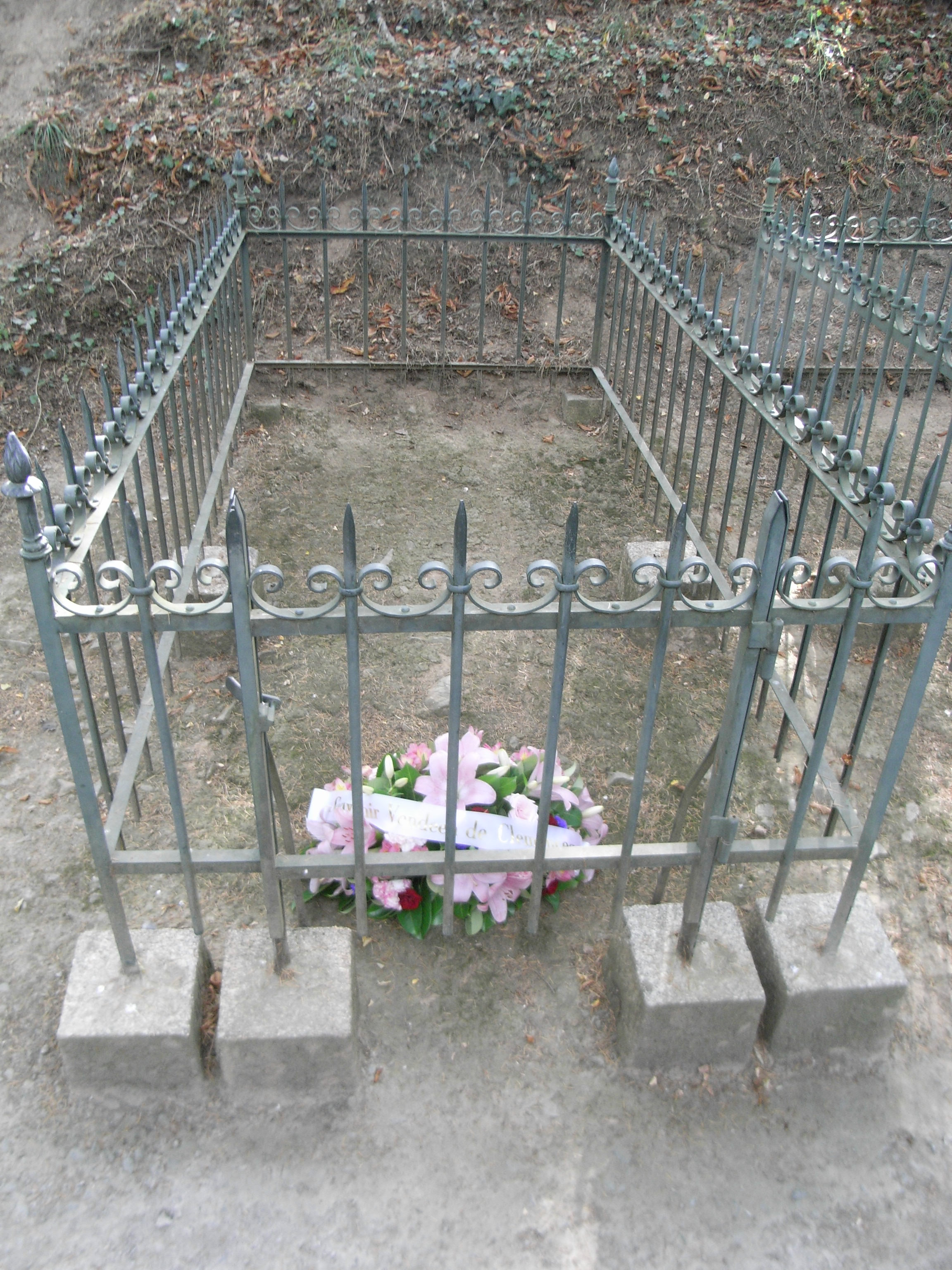
Clemenceau's grave at Mouchamps

During his last months, he wrote his memoirs, despite declaring previously that he would not write them. He was spurred into doing so by the appearance of Marshal Foch's memoirs, which were highly critical of Clemenceau, mainly for his policy at the Paris Peace Conference. Clemenceau only had time to finish the first draft and it was published posthumously as Grandeurs et miseres d'une victoire (Grandeur and Misery of Victory). He was critical of Foch and also of his successors who had allowed the Treaty of Versailles to be undermined in the face of Germany's revival. He burned all of his private letters.

Clemenceau died on 24 November 1929 and was buried in a simple grave next to his father's at Mouchamps.

== Honours ==
- 1919: Member of the Royal Academy of Science, Letters and Fine Arts of Belgium

== Clemenceau's first ministry, 25 October 1906 – 24 July 1909 ==
- Georges Clemenceau – President of the Council and Minister of the Interior
- Stéphen Pichon – Minister of Foreign Affairs
- Georges Picquart – Minister of War
- Joseph Caillaux – Minister of Finance
- René Viviani – Minister of Labour and Social Security Provisions
- Edmond Guyot-Dessaigne – Minister of Justice
- Gaston Thomson – Minister of Marine
- Aristide Briand – Minister of Public Instruction, Fine Arts, and Worship
- Joseph Ruau – Minister of Agriculture
- Raphaël Milliès-Lacroix – Minister of Colonies
- Louis Barthou – Minister of Public Works, Posts, and Telegraphs
- Gaston Doumergue – Minister of Commerce and Industry

Changes

- 4 January 1908 – Aristide Briand succeeds Guyot-Dessaigne as Minister of Justice. Gaston Doumergue succeeds Briand as Minister of Public Instruction and Fine Arts. Briand remains Minister of Worship. Jean Cruppi succeeds Doumergue as Minister of Commerce and Industry.
- 22 October 1908 – Alfred Picard succeeds Thomson as Minister of Marine.

== Clemenceau's second ministry, 16 November 1917 – 20 January 1920 ==
- Georges Clemenceau – President of the Council and Minister of War
- Stéphen Pichon – Minister of Foreign Affairs
- Louis Loucheur – Minister of Armaments and War Manufacturing
- Jules Pams – Minister of the Interior
- Louis Lucien Klotz – Minister of Finance
- Pierre Colliard – Minister of Labour and Social Security Provisions
- Louis Nail – Minister of Justice
- Georges Leygues – Minister of Marine
- Louis Lafferre – Minister of Public Instruction and Fine Arts
- Victor Boret – Minister of Agriculture and Supply
- Henry Simon – Minister of Colonies
- Albert Claveille – Minister of Public Works and Transport
- Étienne Clémentel – Minister of Commerce, Industry, Maritime Transports, Merchant Marine, Posts, and Telegraphs
- Charles Jonnart – Minister of Liberated Regions and Blockade

Changes

- 23 November 1917 – Albert Lebrun succeeds Jonnart as Minister of Liberated Regions and Blockade
- 26 November 1918 – Louis Loucheur becomes Minister of Industrial Reconstitution, his office of Minister of Armaments and War Manufacturing is abolished
- 24 December 1918 – The office of Minister of Blockade is abolished, Lebrun remains Minister of Liberated Regions
- 5 May 1919 – Albert Claveille succeeds Clémentel as Minister of Merchant Marine, he remains Minister of Public Works and Transport, while Clémentel remains Minister of Commerce, Industry, Posts, and Telegraphs
- 20 July 1919 – Joseph Noulens succeeds Boret as Minister of Agriculture and Supply
- 6 November 1919 – André Tardieu succeeds Lebrun as Minister of Liberated Regions
- 27 November 1919 – Léon Bérard succeeds Lafferre as Minister of Public Instruction and Fine Arts, Louis Dubois succeeds Clémentel as Minister of Commerce, Industry, Posts, and Telegraphs
- 2 December 1919 – Paul Jourdain succeeds Colliard as Minister of Labour and Social Security Provisions

== Personal life ==
Clemenceau was a long-time friend and supporter of the impressionist painter Claude Monet. He was instrumental in persuading Monet to have a cataract operation in 1923. For more than a decade, Clemenceau encouraged Monet to complete his donation to the French state of the large Les Nymphéas (Water Lilies) paintings that now are on display in the Paris Musée de l'Orangerie. They are housed in specially constructed oval galleries that opened to the public in 1927.

Having fought a dozen duels against political opponents, Clemenceau knew the importance of exercise and practised fencing every morning even when he was an old man. In 1897, Joseph, Prince de Caraman-Chimay and Georges Clemenceau (then the President of the Council of Paris, later the Prime Minister of France), fought a duel with swords over an article published by Clemenceau in L'Écho de Paris. "Both were wounded simultaneously, Clemenceau receiving a gash in the right arm and the Prince a slight scratch on the shoulder."

He took an interest in Japanese art, especially Japanese ceramics. He collected approximately 3,000 small incense containers (kōgō 香合), which are now in museums. The Montreal Museum of Fine Arts held a special exhibition of his collection in 1978.

== Namesakes ==
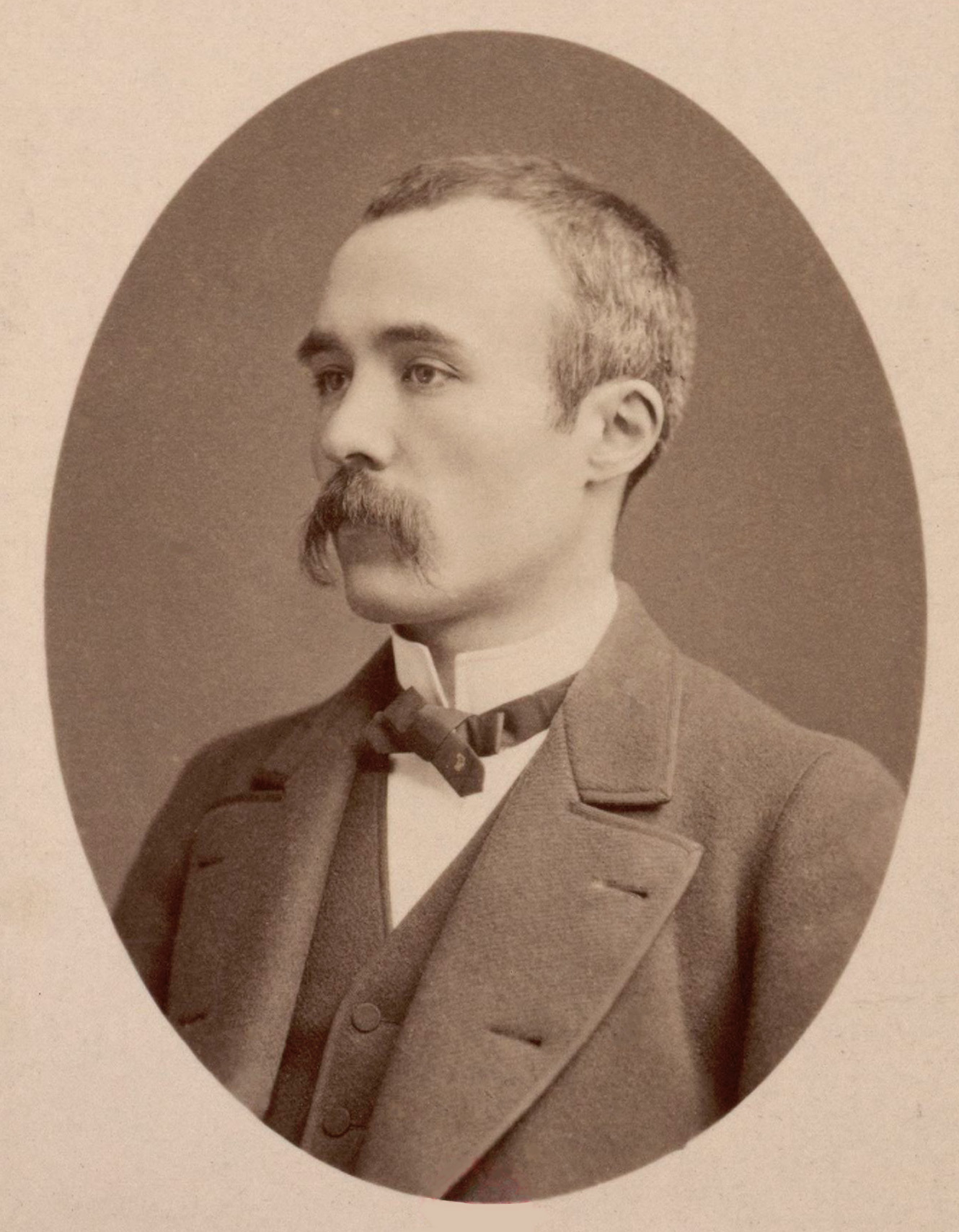
Clemenceau portrait by Nadar

- James Douglas, Jr. bought an apartment in Paris for his friend Clemenceau in 1926 to use as a retirement home. This building later became the Musée Clemenceau.
- Clemenceau, Arizona, U.S. was named in honor of Clemenceau by his friend James Douglas, Jr. in 1917
- Mount Clemenceau (3,658m) in the Canadian Rockies was named after Clemenceau in 1919.
- A Richelieu-class battleship, laid down in January 1939 and destroyed by Allied bombing in 1944, was to be named after Clemenceau.
- The French aircraft carrier Clemenceau was named after Clemenceau.
- Champs-Élysées – Clemenceau is a station on lines 1 and 13 of the Paris Métro in the 8th arrondissement. The stations platforms and access tunnels lie beneath Avenue des Champs-Élysées and Place Clemenceau.
- The Cuban Romeo y Julieta cigar brand once produced a size named the Clemenceau in his honour, and the Dominican-made variety still does.
- One of Beirut's streets is named in honour of Clemenceau. See Rue Clemenceau
- Similarly, there is a street named Clemenceau in a southeastern suburb of Montreal, Canada (Verdun).
- One of Singapore's streets is named in honour of Clemenceau. See Clemenceau Avenue. Clemenceau was on an eastern tour in the 1920s, when he visited Singapore, and was invited to witness the foundation stone laying of a cenotaph. At that visit, he had the honour to mark the foundation of Clemenceau Avenue. The Clemenceau Bridge (1920s) was a crossing over the Singapore River.
- A street in the centre of Belgrade is named after him.
- A street in the centre of Bucharest is named after him.
- A street in the centre of Antibes is named after him.

== See also ==
- Interwar France
- International relations (1919–1939)
- List of covers of Time magazine – 4 January 1926

== Sources and further reading ==
- Castillon, René (2007), "Le 19 juin 1907, la crise de la viticulture languedocienne débouche...", La Vie (in French), archived from the original on 13 October 2012
- This article incorporates text from a publication now in the public domain: Chisholm, Hugh, ed. (1910). "Clemenceau, Georges". Encyclopædia Britannica. Vol. 6 (11th ed.). Cambridge University Press. p. 482.
- Chisholm, Hugh, ed. (1922). "Clemenceau, Georges Eugène Benjamin". Encyclopædia Britannica. Vol. 30 (12th ed.). London & New York: The Encyclopædia Britannica Company. pp. 701–702.
- Cohen, Eliot A. Supreme Command: Soldiers, Statesmen, and Leadership in Wartime (Free Press, 2002)
- Dallas, Gregor. At the Heart of a Tiger: Clemenceau and His World 1841–1929 (1993); emphasis on political milieu
- Doughty, Robert A. (2005). Pyrrhic Victory. Harvard University Press. ISBN 978-0-674-02726-8.
- Duval-Stalla, Alexandre, "Claude Monet - Georges Clemenceau : une histoire, deux cacactères", (Paris : Folio, 2013)
- Gazdar, Kaevan (30 September 2016), Feminism's Founding Fathers: The Men Who Fought for Women's Rights, John Hunt Publishing, ISBN 978-1-78099-161-0, archived from the original on 28 October 2023
- Gottfried, Ted. Georges Clemenceau (1987) online
- Greenhalgh, Elizabeth, " David Lloyd George, Georges Clemenceau, and the 1918 Manpower Crisis", Historical Journal (2007) 50#2 pp. 397–421
- Greenhalgh, Elizabeth. "Marshal Ferdinand Foch versus Georges Clemenceau in 1919", War in History 24.4 (2017): 458-497. online Archived 28 October 2023 at the Wayback Machine
- Hanks, Robert K. "Georges Clemenceau and the English", Historical Journal 45.1 (2002): 53-77.
- Holt, E., The Tiger: The Life of Georges Clemenceau 1841–1929, (London : Hamilton, 1976)
- Jackson, Peter. "Great Britain in French Policy Conceptions at the Paris Peace Conference, 1919", Diplomacy & Statecraft 30.2 (2019): 358-397 online Archived 28 October 2023 at the Wayback Machine.
- Jackson, J. Hampden. Clemenceau and the Third Republic (1962) online edition Archived 23 June 2013 at the Wayback Machine
- Jackson, Peter. "A Tran-Atlantic Condominium of Democratic Power: the grand design for a post-war order at the heart of French policy at the Paris Peace Conference", Journal of Military and Strategic Studies 16.2 (2015) online Archived 28 October 2023 at the Wayback Machine.
- King, Jere Clemens. Foch versus Clemenceau (Harvard UP, 1960), in 1918-1919. online
- Lentin, Antony. "‘Une aberration inexplicable’? Clemenceau and the abortive Anglo‐French guarantee treaty of 1919", Diplomacy and Statecraft 8.2 (1997): 31-49.
- McDougall, Walter A. France's Rhineland Diplomacy, 1914–1924: The Last Bid for a Balance of Power in Europe (Princeton UP, 1978)
- MacMillan, Margaret. Peacemakers: The Paris Conference of 1919 and Its Attempt to End War (2001)
- McAuliffe, Mary. Dawn of the Belle Epoque: The Paris of Monet, Zola, Bernhardt, Eiffel, Debussy, Clemenceau, and Their Friends (2011) excerpt and text search Archived 15 March 2021 at the Wayback Machine
- Martet, Jean. Clemenceau: the events of his life as told by himself (1930) online
- Milza, Pierre (2009). L'année terrible – La Commune (mars-juin 1871). Paris: Perrin. ISBN 978-2-262-03073-5.
- Newhall, David S. Clemenceau: A Life at War (1991)
- Palmer, Alan (1998). Victory 1918. Weidenfeld & Nicolson. ISBN 978-0-297-84124-1.
- Roberts, John. "Clemenceau: The Politician" History Today (Sep 1956) 6#9 pp 581–591
- Soutou, Georges-Henri. "The French Peacemakers and Their Home Front", in Manfred F. Boemeke, Gerald D. Feldman and Elisabeth Glaser, eds, The Treaty of Versailles: A Reassessment 75 Years On (1998), pp. 167–88.
- Stevenson, David. "French war aims and the American challenge, 1914–1918", Historical Journal 22.4 (1979): 877-894.
- Terraine, John (1978). To Win a War. London: Sidgwick & Jackson. ISBN 978-0-304-35321-7.
- Tuchman, Barbara (1962). August 1914. Constable & Co. (2004 paperback edition ISBN 978-0-345-47609-8)
- Watson, D. R. "The Making of French Foreign Policy during the First Clemenceau Ministry, 1906-1909", English Historical Review (1971) 86#341 pp. 774–782 in JSTOR Archived 8 March 2021 at the Wayback Machine
- Watson, David R. Georges Clemenceau: France: Makers of the Modern World (2009), 176pp excerpt and text search Archived 8 April 2021 at the Wayback Machine
- Watson, David R. Georges Clemenceau: A Political Biography (1976) New York, David McKay, ISBN 0-679-50703-5 online edition Archived 27 January 2012 at the Wayback Machine
- Watson, David R. "Clemenceau's Contacts with England", Diplomacy and Statecraft 17.4 (2006): 715-730.

== Primary sources ==
- Clemenceau, Georges. "De la génération des éléments anatomiques" (1865) Archived 28 October 2023 at the Wayback Machine
- South America To Day by Georges Clemenceau at archive.org. In English.
- The strongest (Les plus fort) by Georges Clemenceau at archive.org
- The surprises of life by Georges Clemenceau at archive.org
- At the foot of Sinai by Georges Clemenceau at archive.org

Political offices
Preceded by Ferdinand Sarrien	Prime Minister of France; 1906–1909	Succeeded by Aristide Briand
Preceded by Fernand Dubief	Minister of the Interior; 1906–1909	Succeeded by Aristide Briand
Preceded by Paul Painlevé	Prime Minister of France; 1917–1920	Succeeded by Alexandre Millerand
Preceded by Paul Painlevé	Minister of War; 1917–1920	Succeeded by André Joseph Lefèvre
