= Mouvement Franciste =

Francist Movement Mouvement franciste
- President: Marcel Bucard
- Founded: 1933; 93 years ago
- Dissolved: 1945; 81 years ago
- Preceded by: Le Faisceau
- Headquarters: Vichy, France
- Newspaper: Le Francisme
- Paramilitary wing: Blueshirts
- Membership: 10,000 (1933 est.)
- Ideology: Francism: French nationalism; Fascism; Antisemitism; Fascist corporatism
- Political position: Far-right
- International affiliation: Fascist International (1934)
- Colours: Blue Red Gold

Party flag

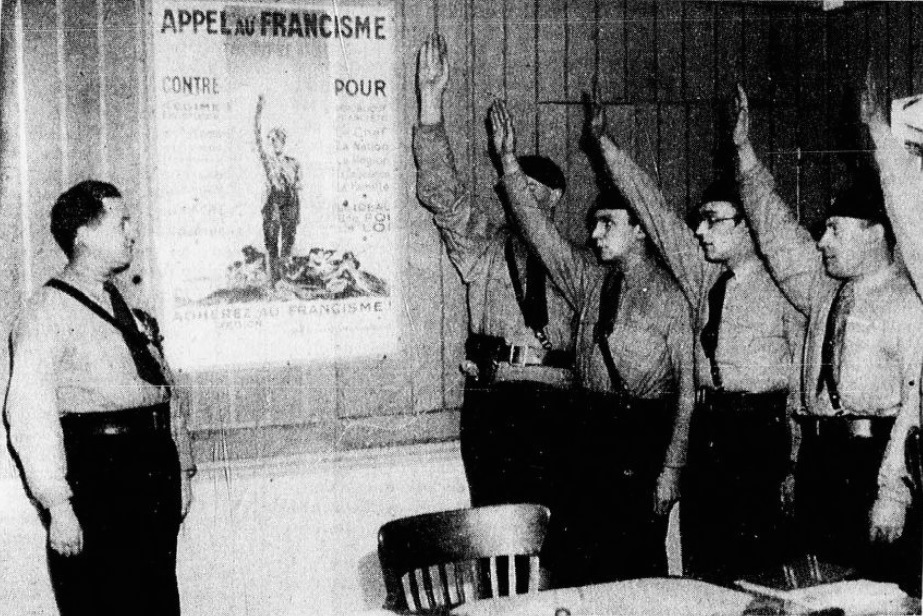
Bucard and members of the Francist Movement, 1934

The Francist Movement (French: Mouvement franciste, MF) was a French fascist and antisemitic league created by Marcel Bucard in September 1933 that edited the newspaper Le Francisme. Mouvement franciste reached a membership of 10,000 and was financed by the Italian dictator, Benito Mussolini. Its members were deemed the francistes or Chemises bleues (Blueshirts) and gave the Roman salute (a paramilitary character that was mirrored in France by François Coty's Solidarité Française).

It took part in the Paris protests of 6 February 1934, during which the entire far right (from Action Française to Croix-de-Feu) protested the implications of the Stavisky Affair and possibly attempted to topple Édouard Daladier's government. It incorporated the Solidarité française after Coty's death later in the same year.

All of the movements that participated in the 6 February riots were outlawed in 1936, when Léon Blum's Popular Front government passed new legislation on the matter. After a failed attempt in 1938, the movement was refounded as a political party (Parti franciste) in 1941, after France had been overrun by Nazi Germany.

Together with Jacques Doriot's Parti Populaire Français and Marcel Déat's Rassemblement National Populaire, the francistes were the main collaborators of the Nazi occupiers and Vichy France. The Parti Franciste did not survive the end of World War II, and was considered treasonous. Bucard was executed as a collaborator after the war.

== Creation ==
Francisme was created in August–September 1933 by Marcel Bucard, a former seminarian and war hero, who had already participated in a number of nationalist and proto-fascist movements: French Action, Faisceau, French Solidarity and Croix de Feu. The official creation takes place on 29 September 1933 at 11 pm, during a ceremony organized at the Arc de Triomphe in Paris. Marcel Bucard whilst delivering a speech at the ceremony stated that he wanted: "(...) to found a movement of revolutionary action whose aim is to conquer power" and "to stop the race to the abyss".

The movement was heavily inspired by Mussolini's National Fascist Party and received significant funding and support from the Italian fascist movement; Bucard wrote, "Our Francism is to France what Fascism is to Italy".

== Collaboration with the German occupation ==
During the Occupation, the Franciste Movement was relaunched and along with Jacques Doriot's French Popular Party (PPF) and Marcel Déat's National Popular Rally (RNP) is one of the most notable political movement to collaborate with the occupying German authorities.

On May 5, 1941, Marcel Bucard and Paul Guiraud (associate of philosophy, son of Jean Guiraud, editor-in-chief of La Croix ) relaunched Francisme. Paul Guiraud attempted to give the movement a more "socialist" look. Similarly, Bucard defended the General Confederation of Labour (dissolved during the occupation) and criticized the Vichy regime's Labor Charter, which he considered not socialist enough.

Like the other collaboration movements, the movement failed to become a mass movement. At its peak (summer 1943), according to historian duo Lambert-Le Marec it had some 5,500 members (4,000 in the provinces and 1,500 in the Paris region) or, according to other sources, a maximum of 8,000 members. The newspaper Le Franciste reached a maximum circulation during the war of 20,000 copies.

In 1943, it participated in a collaborationist front, dominated by the National Popular Rally, in an attempt to unify with other fascist movements. Like the other parties, the Franciste Movement was heavily collaborationist (creation of the Task Forces to fight against resistance was one such example). Many of its members participated in antisemitic and anti-communist operations, and members joined the Milice, which actively targeted the French Resistance. It was particularly well established in the departments of Seine-et-Oise and Morbihan, where local people were involved in incidents of violence.

On July 4, 1944, two policemen were killed by Bucard's bodyguards during an altercation after he robbed a Jewish jewelry store. Bucard was imprisoned, but released on July 29, just in time to flee to Germany on August 12 with the other Francists as the Allies invaded France in Operation Overlord. Bucard was finally arrested, tried, and sentenced to death on February 21, 1946, and shot on March 19 at Fort Chatillon, near Paris. Facing a firing squad, he refused to wear a blindfold and shouted, "Qui vive? La France!" before it fired. His family were denied a request that his body be deposited in the family vault; he was buried in the Parisian cemetery of Thiais, now in the department of Val-de-Marne.
