= Far-right leagues =

Series of far-right movements in France from the late 19th to mid-20th centuries

The far-right leagues (French: ligues d'extrême droite) were several French far-right movements opposed to parliamentarism, which mainly dedicated themselves to military parades, street brawls, demonstrations and riots. The term ligue was often used in the 1930s to distinguish these political movements from parliamentary parties. After having appeared first at the end of the 19th century during the Dreyfus affair, they became common in the 1920s and 1930s, and famously participated in the 6 February 1934 crisis and riots which overthrew the second Cartel des gauches, the center-left coalition government led by Édouard Daladier.

In the decades following the crisis, the French Left generally believed that these riots represented an attempted coup d'état against the French Republic. Contemporary historians have shown that, despite the riots and their impact on the ruling coalition, the leagues and their leaders had not made organized plans to overthrow Daladier's government. The widespread concern over fascist organizing led to the mobilization of the anti-fascist movement in France, and the dissolution of the leagues in 1936 by the Popular Front government headed by Léon Blum; this was met by an intensification of violence by prominent far-right organizations.

== Debate on "French Fascism" ==
The debate on a "French Fascism" is closely related to the existence of these anti-parliamentary leagues, of which many adopted at least the exterior signs and rituals of fascism (Roman salute, etc.) and explicitly imitated on one hand Mussolini's squadristis or, on the other hand, Hitler's Nazi party's organization — one should bear in mind, when analyzing "French fascism", international relations: in the 1930s, conservative president of the Council Pierre Laval initiated relations with Mussolini's Italy and the USSR against Germany, seen as the "hereditary enemy" of France (see French–German enmity). After Laval's meeting with Mussolini in Rome on 4 January 1935, this policy led to the signature of the Stresa front in 1935. Thus, the French far-right was split between Italian fascism, Nazism and nationalism, which forbade them from allying themselves with Hitler and pushed towards an alliance with Mussolini. Individual trajectories during Vichy France, when some far-right members ultimately chose the Resistance against the German occupant, illustrate these ideological conflicts.

Leagues created in the 1920s from veterans' associations are usually distinguished from those created in the 1930s, such as Marcel Bucard's Francisme, which were more explicitly influenced by Fascism or Nazism — one of these reasons being the common anti-militarism, pacifism and opposition to colonial expansion present in several veterans' associations of the 1920s. Leagues however quickly broke with this left-wing anti-militarism and anti-colonialism. Both Cartels des Gauches (Left Wing Coalition, the first from 1924 to 1926 and the second from 1932 to the 6 February 1934 riots) saw the appearance of many leagues intent on overthrowing them through street demonstrations. Thus, Pierre Taittinger's Jeunesses Patriotes (JP) were founded during the first Cartel, headed by Édouard Herriot, in 1924, as well as Georges Valois's Faisceau (1925) and colonel de la Rocque's Croix-de-Feu, founded a year after Herriot's fall. On the other hand, François Coty's Solidarité française and Marcel Bucard's Francisme were both founded in 1933, during Édouard Daladier's left-wing government. Daladier was replaced after the 6 February 1934 riots by conservative Gaston Doumergue, who included in his cabinet many right wing personalities close to the far-right leagues, such as Philippe Pétain and Pierre Laval.

Most of the debate on the existence of a "French fascism" in between the two wars period has focused on these paramilitary leagues, although most French historians agree in stating that as Fascism is by definition a "mass movement", these leagues do not qualify as such. This, of course, has been debated, since some of them, such as colonel de la Rocque's Croix-de-Feu were very popular and had a quite large membership. De la Rocque, however, who later went on to found the Parti Social Français (PSF, the first French mass party of the right-wing, which would be later imitated by Gaullism), has often been said not to be fascist, an assertion which based itself in particular on his respect for constitutional legality during 6 February 1934 riots. Others observers argue that both Fascism and Nazism formally respected legality, and that this factor, in itself, does not sufficiently set de la Rocque's movement aside from other types of fascism.

== Significant leagues ==
Far-right leagues in France were characterized by their nationalist, militarist, anti-Semitic, anti-parliamentarist and anti-Communist opinions. In addition – and in particular in the 1930s – they were often modelled after Benito Mussolini's paramilitary Blackshirts and favored military parades, uniforms, and displays of their physical might.

The most famous far-right leagues included:

- Ligue of Patriots (Ligue des Patriotes) led by Paul Déroulède (founded in 1882, revived in 1896 during the Dreyfus Affair and finally dissolved soon afterwards)
- Antisemitic League of France (Ligue antisémitique de France) led by Édouard Drumont (founded in 1889, disappeared before World War I)
- King's Camelots (Camelots du Roi), founded in 1908. Youth organization of the far-right royalist Action Française movement, which was involved in the February 1934 riots.
- Young Patriots (Jeunesses Patriotes), founded in 1924 by Pierre Taittinger. Claiming the legacy of Déroulède's League of Patriots, it also took part in the February 1934 riots. Presenting itself as a movement in favor of stronger executive power and with the officially proclaimed aims of "defending institutions from the left wing", the Young Patriots adopted ceremonial signs popularised by fascists (such as the Roman salute) but conserved, on the whole, a reactionary program distinct from fascism.
- Peasant Defense (Défense Paysanne), also known as Green Shirts (Chemises Vertes) founded by Henry Dorgères
- Peasant Front (Front Paysan), formed of three older agrarian groups including Peasant Defence
- Frontisme, founded by Gaston Bergery.
- Le Faisceau, a fascist party founded in 1925 by Georges Valois. Heavily inspired by Mussolini's fascism, the Faisceau claimed to make the synthesis between socialism and nationalism, which is at the basis of national-socialist ideology. It reached its peak in 1926, with 25,000 members of "Blue Shirts" (modelled after the Blackshirts in Italy), before dissolving due to internal disputes.
- Young Men Team (Jungmannschaft), founded by Hermann Bickler as the youth wing of the Independent Regional Party for Alsace–Lorraine in 1932. Became the Alsace–Lorrainian Party (Elsass-Lothringer Partei) in 1936 after the ban of the other leagues. Banned in 1939.
- Cross of Fire (Croix-de-Feu), an association of veterans, founded in 1927. Headed by François de La Rocque, it staged a peaceful rally on 6 February 1934 and did not take part in the riots. It gradually became moderate, eventually transforming into a democratic centre-right party, the Parti Social Français (1936–40). During World War II, La Rocque used his party as an intelligence resistance network linked with the British intelligence. It paved the way to Gaullism.
- French Solidarity (Solidarité Française), founded in 1933 by perfume businessman François Coty (1874–1934).
- Francist Movement (Mouvement Franciste), founded by Marcel Bucard in September 1933. Partly funded by Mussolini, it was dissolved in 1936 following the prohibition by the Popular Front government, only to reappear in 1941 under the Vichy regime. Its members were some of the most enthusiastic collaborators with the Nazis.
- National Labour Front (Front National du Travail/Volksständische Arbeitsfront), founded by Joseph Bilger in 1934. Merger of Elsässischer Bauernbund, Werkbund and Jung-Front.
- The Cowl (La Cagoule), founded in 1936 by Eugène Deloncle.

== Dissolution of the leagues ==
This context of street agitation led Pierre Laval's government to outlaw paramilitary organizations on 6 December 1935, and then to pass the 10 January 1936 law on militias and combat groups. This law limited the right of association (resulting from the 1901 law on associations) if these groups organized armed demonstrations in the streets, if they presented a paramilitary or militia aspect or if they attempted to overthrow the Republic or threatened the integrity of the national territory. The 10 January 1936 law was however only partially implemented, and only the monarchist Action Française was dissolved as a result of the law, on 13 February 1936.

The Popular Front thus included the dissolution of the leagues in its 12 January 1936 electoral program. This proposition was implemented after the May 1936 election which brought Léon Blum to power. Marceau Pivert publicly called for the dissolution of the leagues on 27 May 1936 in the newspaper Le Populaire.

On 19 June 1936, interior minister Roger Salengro had President Albert Lebrun sign a decree outlawing the major leagues, which were soon dissolved (these included Croix-de-Feu, Solidarité Française, Jeune Patrie and Francistes). Three days later, La Rocque bypassed the dissolution of his Croix-de-Feu association by creating the Parti Social Français (PSF). Salengro's initiative led the far-right newspaper Gringoire (which at the time had a circulation of 500,000 issues per week) to initiate a defamation campaign against him, which finally drove him to commit suicide on 18 November 1936.

== Far-right nowadays (XXI century) ==
Whilst the leagues have been dissolved, far-right parties still exist in France. Here is a list of the current far-right parties in the national assembly as of 2026:

Party	Head of the Party	Year of creation
RN (Rassemblement National)	Marine Le Pen	1972
UPR (Union des Droites pour la République)	Éric Ciotti	2024

== See also ==
- Revanchism
- Dreyfus Affair
- Both Cartel des gauches (1924–26, and 1932–34)
- 6 February 1934 crisis marked by riots organized by far-right leagues
- History of far-right movements in France
- Non-conformists of the 1930s
- Freikorps – similar right-wing paramilitary movements in Weimar Germany
- Uyoku dantai – similar phenomenon in post-war Japan
- Frontist movement – far-right groups in Switzerland
