= Cris Campion =

French actor

- Born: Thierry Campion; September 1, 1966 (age 59); Versailles, France
- Occupation: Actor
- Years active: 1985–present
- Notable work: Pirates, Field of Honor, Charlemagne, le prince à cheval
- Spouse: Anny Duperey (m. 1993; sep. c. 2003)

Cris Campion (born 1 September 1966) is a French film and television actor, previously known as Thierry Campion.

Born in Versailles, Campion's first leading role came in Roman Polanski’s Pirates (1986). The next year, he was nominated for a César Award for Most Promising Actor for Field of Honor. In Charlemagne, le prince à cheval (1993), he played Pepin the Hunchback.

Campion married Anny Duperey in 1993, two years after she had left Bernard Giraudeau, but they separated after some ten years. Duperey has called Giraudeau “the man of my life” and Campion “the love of my life”.

== Appearances ==
- Le café (1985)
- Pirates (1986), as Jean-Baptiste, called Frog
- Field of Honor (1987), as Pierre Naboulet
- Un sketch (1987)
- Beyond Therapy (1987), as Andrew
- The Ray Bradbury Theater (1988), as Terwilliger
- Le Client (short film, 1988), as Eric
- Chillers (Day of Reckoning) (1990), as Jean Arnaud
- Fortune Express (1991), as Pascal Perkiss
- The Adventures of Young Indiana Jones (1992), as Lieutenant Gaston
- Sup de fric (Christian Gion, 1992), as Victor Dargelas
- Ma sœur, mon amour (1992), as Gaetan
- Le voyage d'Eva (1992), as Laurent
- Charlemagne, le prince à cheval (television, 1993), as Pepin the Hunchback
- Fortitude (television, 1994), as Pierrot
- Taxandria (1995), dubbing
- Navarro (television series, 1995 season), as Antoine
- La Femme de la forêt (1996), as Bertrand
- Exit Wounds (1997), as Cyril
- Le Bahut (television series, 1998 season), as Jérôme
- Une famille formidable (2000), as Vincent
- Marie Fransson (2001), as Atlas
- Méditerranée (2001, television), as Marco
- Gaetan et Rachel en toute innocence (2002)
- Leave Your Hands on My Hips (2003), as Musician
- Julie Lescaut (television series, 2003 episode “Hors la loi”), as Berteau
- Frank Riva (television series, 2004) as Stan
- The Waves (2005)
- Standing Tall (2005, TV)
- Les Hauts plateaux (stage play)
- PJ (television series, 2006 season), as Jean-Marie
- Greco (television, 2007), as Joseph
- Section de recherches (2007), as Alain
- Plus belle la vie (television soap, 2008 season), as Cédric
