= Marcel Bucard =

French politician (1895–1946)

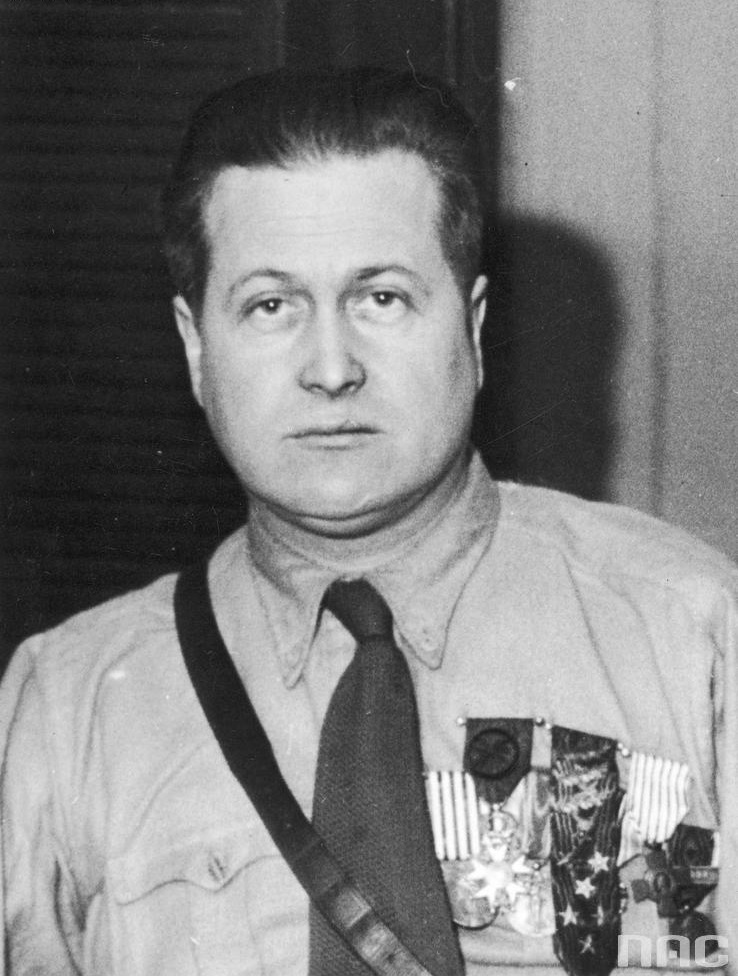
- Bucard in 1936
- Born: 7 December 1895; Saint-Clair-sur-Epte, Val-d'Oise, France
- Died: 13 March 1946 (aged 50); Fort de Châtillon, Paris, France
- Occupation: Politician
- Political party: Mouvement Franciste
- Status: Execution by firing squad
- Conviction: Treason
- Penalty: Death

Marcel Bucard (7 December 1895 – 13 March 1946) was a French Fascist politician.

== Early career ==
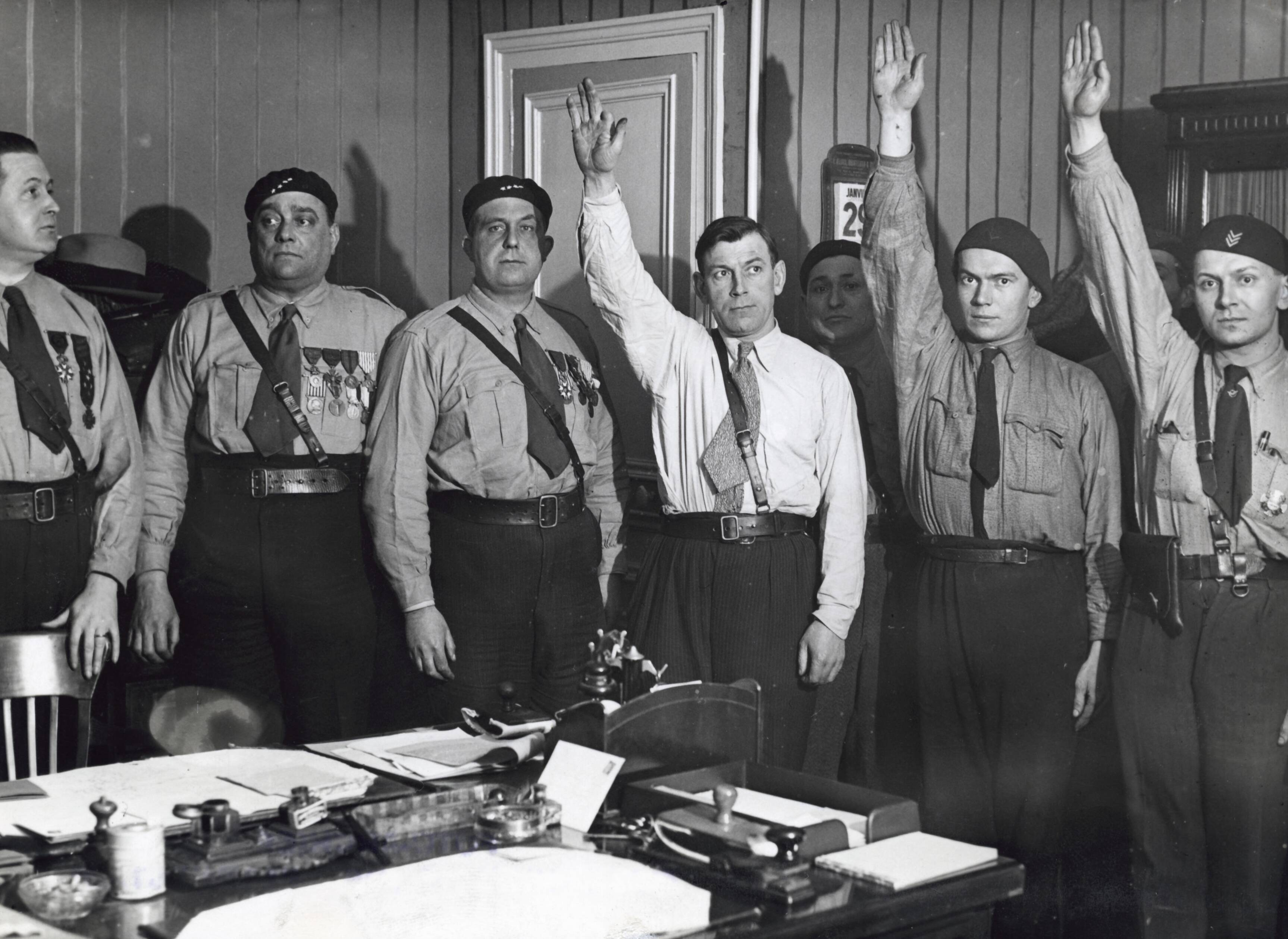
From left to right: Marcel Bucard, Paul Lafitte and J.-B. L'Herault (Jan. 1934)

A decorated soldier who earned a reputation for bravery in World War I, Bucard became active in politics after 1918, initially as a member of Action française, an integralist monarchist far-right group, and later as a member of the overtly-fascist and anti-Semitic Faisceau of Georges Valois.

In September 1933, Bucard founded his own group, the Mouvement franciste, which was arguably the most extreme group and was financed by Benito Mussolini's government. During the 6 February 1934 crisis, the Francistes joined the other right-wing parties in the protests and riots in front of the Palais Bourbon provoked by the Stavisky Affair and accused of being intended as a coup d'état.

In 1936, the new Popular Front government banned his movement and all other right-wing "leagues", fascist or otherwise, and Bucard was briefly imprisoned. His attempt to recreate the movement as a party (Parti franciste) in 1938 had little success, and it was outlawed as well.

== World War II ==
After the Fall of France during World War II and the start of Nazi Germany's occupation of France and of Vichy France, Bucard's Parti was again active (from 1941), now as a collaborationist force. Bucard called upon his Francists to give whatever support they could to the Germans, including military intelligence and information on the Resistance. His role in the period was, however, limited, as he was usually absent since he suffered from old wounds. He was still a co-founder of the Légion des volontaires français contre le bolchevisme. After the Normandy landings, he argued that Francists should join the French Waffen SS or French/foreign units in the National Socialist Motor Corps or the Kriegsmarine.

== Death ==
In 1946, after the German defeat, Bucard was sentenced to death for treason, and a month later executed by firing squad at the Fort de Châtillon. Marcel Bucard went to the firing squad while singing the Catholic song "Je suis chrétien! Voilà ma gloire" (I am a Christian, that is my Glory).

At his trial, the prosecutor, Vassart, accused the Francists of routinely infiltrating French resistance groups to betray them to the Germans, of numerous crimes, including the murder of opponents and violently resisting French police even before the Liberation, and Bucard was blamed for the deaths of Soviet and French combatants because of his wholehearted support for the German occupier and his recruitment activities on behalf of the LVF, the Milice and the French Waffen SS.
