= 6 February 1934 crisis =

Far-right protest and riot in France

- Part of the interwar period
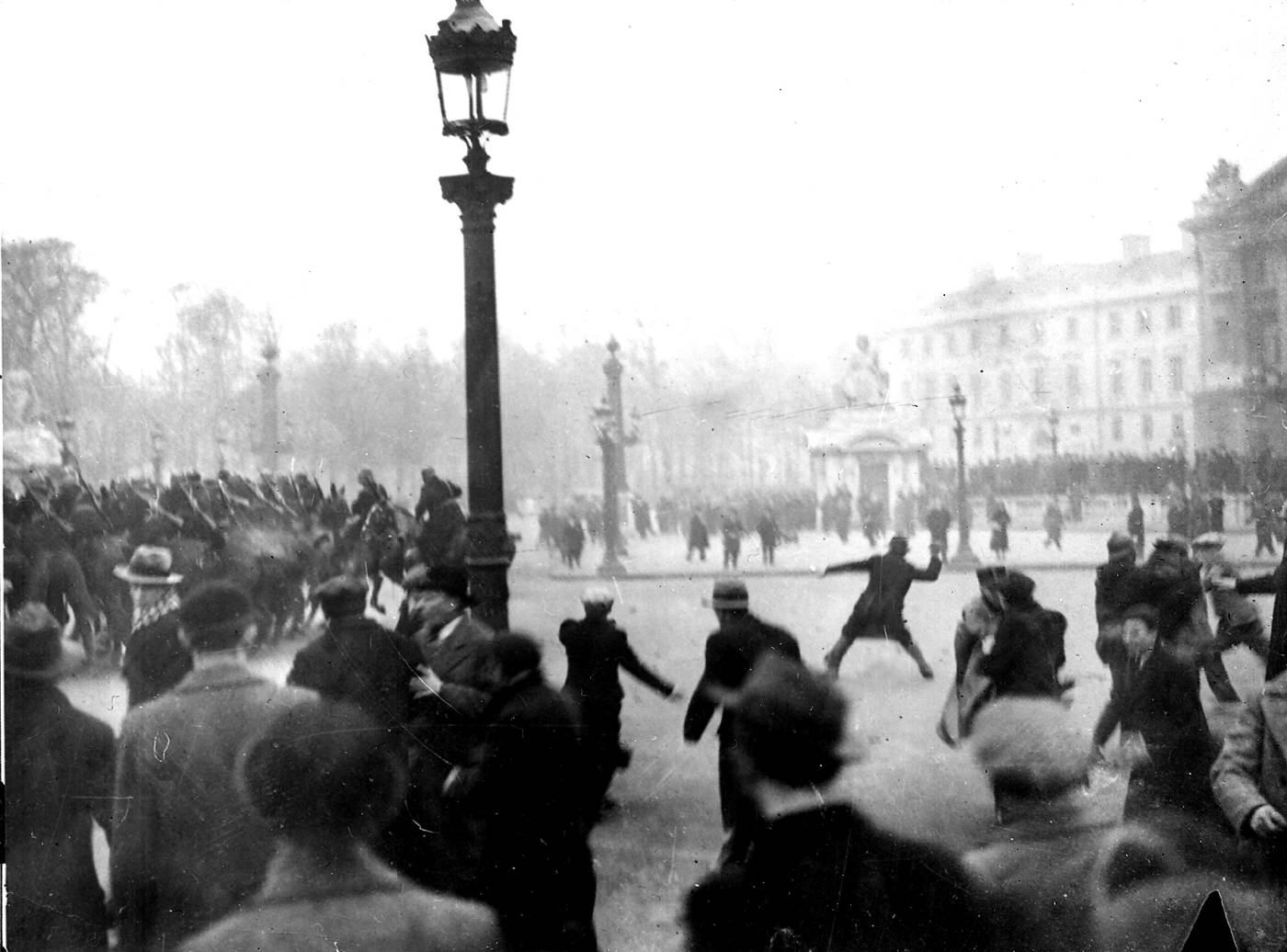
- Rioters attacking mounted police with projectiles outside the Place de la Concorde during the crisis
- Date: 6 February 1934
- Location: Place de la Concorde, Paris, France
- Caused by: Fallout from the Stavisky affair; Dismissal of Jean Chiappe
- Methods: Riots
- Result: Resignation of Édouard Daladier; Counter-demonstrations by left-wing groups; Further radicalization of the right-wing

Parties
| Far-right leagues; Action Française; Young Patriots; Francist Movement; Cross of Fire; French Solidarity; UNC | Government of France; Cartel of the Left; Paris police | Left-wing protesters; PCF; ARAC |

Lead figures
| Charles Maurras; Pierre Taittinger; Marcel Bucard; François de La Rocque; François Coty | Albert Lebrun; Édouard Daladier | Maurice Thorez |

Casualties
- Deaths: 17 (including 9 right-wing protesters)

The 6 February 1934 crisis (French: Crise du 6 février 1934), also known as the Veterans' Riot, was an anti-parliamentarist street demonstration in Paris on 6 February 1934.

Prime Minister Édouard Daladier came to power in late January to replace Camille Chautemps in the aftermath of the Stavisky Affair. Daladier's dismissal of Jean Chiappe, the anti-communist Paris Prefect of Police, caused multiple far-right leagues to organize protests. These rapidly degenerated into a riot on the Place de la Concorde, near the building used for the National Assembly, against Daladier's centre-left government and the Third Republic. Demonstrations ended when Daladier resigned and a caretaker government of national unity headed by former prime minister Gaston Doumergue was established.

The police shot and killed 17 people, nine of whom were far-right protesters. It was one of the major political crises during the Third Republic and the only time a government had been brought down by demonstrations. France's political left claimed it was a fascist coup d'état attempt, leading to the creation of several left-wing anti-fascist organizations such as the Comité de vigilance des intellectuels antifascistes. According to historian Joel Colton, "The consensus among scholars is that there was no concerted or unified design to seize power and that the leagues lacked the coherence, unity, or leadership to accomplish such an end." After World War II, several historians, among them Serge Berstein, argued that while some leagues had indisputably desired a coup, François de La Rocque had in fact moderated toward a respect for constitutional order. The 6 February actions were arguably an uncoordinated but violent attempt to overthrow the left-wing Cartel des gauches government elected in 1932.

== Background ==
In the early 1930s, the Third Republic of France was experiencing a number of political and economic crises which led to instability. The Great Depression, initiated by the Wall Street crash of 1929, would eventually begin to affect France in 1931, somewhat later than other Western countries. A succession of political scandals rocked the French government at the same time, including the Marthe Hanau Affair, the Oustric Affair, and the Stavisky Affair. The Oustric Affair had involved the Minister of Justice Raoul Péret and collapsed Prime Minister André Tardieu's government in 1930. The economic and social crisis particularly affected the middle classes who tended traditionally to endorse the Republic, in particular the Radical-Socialist Party. Parliamentary instability ensued, with five governments between May 1932 and January 1934, which encouraged anti-parliamentarists. Dissidents on the political right took advantage of scandals to agitate against the Third Republic and gain power.

The government of Prime Minister Camille Chautemps was plagued by corruption scandals after the Stavisky Affair had reached the news in 1933. It involved Bayonne's Crédit municipal bank and centered around Alexandre Stavisky, a fraudster and embezzler known as le beau Sasha ("Handsome Sasha") associated with several Radical deputies, including Chautemps and his ministers. Tensions rose when the press later revealed that Stavisky had benefited from a 19-month postponement of his trial because the public prosecutor was Chautemps' brother-in-law. On 8 January 1934, Stavisky was found dead by the police and his cause of death was reported as suicide — a convenient statement that raised public concerns of a cover-up. According to the French right-wing, Chautemps had Stavisky assassinated to keep him from revealing any secrets about him and his government. The press then started a political campaign against alleged governmental corruption, while the far-right demonstrated.

On 27 January 1934, after the revelation of yet another scandal, Chautemps resigned and was succeeded by Édouard Daladier, another politician of the Radical-Socialist Party. Thirteen demonstrations had already occurred in Paris since 9 January. While the parliamentary right was trying to use the affair to replace the left-wing majority elected during the 1932 elections, the far-right took advantage of its traditional themes: antisemitism, xenophobia (Stavisky was a naturalized Ukrainian Jew), hostility toward Freemasonry (Camille Chautemps was a member of the Grand Orient of France), and anti-parliamentarism. As historian Serge Bernstein emphasized, the Stavisky Affair was exceptional neither in its seriousness nor in the personalities put on trial, but in the rightists' determination to use the opportunity to make a leftist government resign, helped by the fact that the Radical-Socialists did not have an absolute majority in the National Assembly, and thus the government was weak and an alternative coalition might be formed by the parties to the right.

It was Daladier's dismissal of Jean Chiappe, the Paris Prefect of Police, that ultimately provoked the massive demonstrations of 6 February. Chiappe was a fervent anti-communist accused of double standards and leniency towards the street agitation of the far-right. This included demonstrations, riots, attacks against the few leftist students in the Quartier Latin by the monarchist Camelots du Roi, the youth organization of the Action Française. According to leftists, Chiappe's dismissal was due to his involvement with the Stavisky Affair, while the rightists denounced the negotiations with the Radical-Socialists: the departure of Chiappe was said to have been in exchange for an endorsement of Daladier's new government.

== The night of 6 February 1934 ==
=== Forces present ===
Rightist anti-parliamentary leagues had been the main activists during the January 1934 demonstrations. Although these leagues were not a new phenomenon (the old Ligue des Patriotes ("Patriot League") had been initiated by Paul Déroulède in 1882), they played an important role after World War I, in particular when leftists were in power, as they had been since the 1932 legislative elections. The leagues differed in their goals, but were united by their opposition to the ruling Radical-Socialist party.

- Action Française. Among the most important rightist leagues present on 6 February, the oldest one was the royalist Ligue d'Action Française. Founded in 1905 by Charles Maurras, it was composed of 60,000 members whose stated goal was to abolish the Third Republic, in order to restore the Bourbon monarchy and thus revert to the status quo of before the 1848 Revolution. Action Française endorsed a royal restoration, but this specific goal served as a rallying theme for a more general series of ideas, appealing to political Catholics, nationalists, and anti-democrats opposed to the secular, internationalist, and parliamentary type of republicanism associated with the Radical-Socialists and the Radicals. Although no longer a major mobilised political force, it had great prestige among the rest of the French right and had succeeded in spreading its ideas to other conservatives. The actual street agitation associated with Action Française was performed largely by its youth wing, the Camelots du Roi, which had much influence with students, and was prone to street brawls with leftist students in the Latin Quarter of Paris.
- The Jeunesses Patriotes ("Patriot Youth") had been initiated by Pierre Taittinger, deputy of Paris, in 1924. With 90,000 members, including 1,500 "elites", it claimed the legacy of the Ligue des Patriotes. Their main point of difference from Action Française was that they did not seek to abolish the republic and restore the monarchy; their chief goal was to end the forty year dominance of Radical-Socialists and Radicals in government, giving the republic a more Catholic and authoritarian direction. The Jeunesses Patriotes had close links with mainstream right-wing politicians, notably the main party of the religious right, the Fédération Républicaine, and boasted several of the capital's municipal councillors in their ranks.
- Solidarité Française ("French Solidarity"), founded in 1933 by the Bonapartist deputy and perfume magnate François Coty, had no precise political objectives and few members.
- Francisme and others. Marcel Bucard's Francisme had adopted all the elements of the fascist ideology, while the Fédération des contribuables ("Taxpayers federation") shared its political objectives with the other leagues.
- The Croix-de-Feu ("Cross of Fire"). The Croix-de-Feu had been created in 1926 as a World War I veterans association. The most important league by membership numbers, it had extended its recruitment in 1931 to other categories of the population, as directed by Colonel François de la Rocque. Like the other leagues, they also had "combat" and "self-defense" groups, known as "dispos". Although many leftists accused it of having become fascist, especially after the crisis, historians now categorise it as a populist social-Catholic protest society, and that La Rocque's reluctance to order his protesters to join with the other leagues in attacking parliament directly was a major reason for the riots' failure to escalate into a regime change.
- Veterans' associations. The veterans' associations which had participated with the demonstrations of January also began demonstrating on 6 February. The most important was the Union nationale des combattants ("National Union of Fighter"; UNC), directed by a Parisian municipal counsellor whose ideas were similar to the rightists', which counted 900,000 members.
- Finally, an indication of the complexity of the situation and the general exasperation of the population, also present were elements associated with the French Communist Party (PCF), including its veterans' association, the Republican Veterans Association (ARAC).

=== The riots ===
On the night of 6 February, the leagues, which had gathered in different places in Paris, all converged on Place de la Concorde, located in front of the Bourbon Palace, but on the other side of the river Seine. The police and guards managed to defend the strategic bridge of the Concorde, despite being the target of all sorts of projectiles. Some rioters were armed, and the police fired on the crowd. Disturbances lasted until 2:30 AM. Seventeen people were killed and 2,000 injured, most of them members of the Action Française.

Far-rightist organisations had the most important role in the riots; most of the UNC veterans avoided the Place de la Concorde, creating some incidents near the Elysée Palace, the president's residence. However, Communists belonging to the rival leftist veterans' organization ARAC may have been involved; one public notice afterward condemned the governing centre-left coalition (known as the Cartel des gauches) for having shot unarmed veterans who shouted "Down with the thieves, long live France!".

While on the right side of the Seine (north, on the Place de la Concorde), the policemen's charges contained the rioters with difficulty, the Croix-de-feu had chosen to demonstrate in the south. The Palais Bourbon, the building used by the National Assembly, is much more difficult to defend on this side, but the Croix-de-feu limited themselves to surrounding the building without any major incident before dispersing. Because of this attitude, they earned the pejorative nickname of Froides Queues in the far-rightist press. Contrary to the other leagues which were intent on abolishing the Republic, it thus seemed that Colonel de la Rocque finally decided to respect the legality of the republican (unlike the Action Française) and parliamentary (unlike the Jeunesses Patriotes) regime.

In the National Assembly, the rightists attempted to take advantage of the riots to cause the Cartel des gauches government to resign. The leftists, however, rallied around president of the Council Édouard Daladier. The session was ended after left and right-wing deputies exchanged blows.

== Consequences of the riots ==
=== Daladier's resignation and the formation of a National Union government ===
During the night, Daladier took the first measures to obtain the re-establishment of public order. He did not exclude the possibility of declaring a state of emergency, although he finally decided against it. However, the next day the judiciary and the police resisted his directives. Moreover, most of his ministers and his party denied him their endorsement. Thus, Daladier finally chose to resign. This was the first time during the Third Republic that a government had to resign because of pressure from street demonstrations.

The crisis was finally resolved with the formation of a new government directed by former president of the Republic (1924–31) Gaston Doumergue, a rightist Radical Republican who was ostensibly the only figure acceptable to both the far-rightist leagues and to the centrist parliamentary parties. Termed a "National Union government", in reality it was a government containing all political traditions but excluding the Socialist and Communist parties. It included the most important politicians of the parliamentary right wing, among them the Liberal André Tardieu, Radical Louis Barthou, and social-Catholic Louis Marin, although also included were several members of the centre-left (the Radical-Socialist and similar smaller parties), plus War Minister Philippe Pétain, who would later command the collaborationist Vichy regime during World War II.

=== Toward the union of the left wing ===
After 6 February, leftists were convinced that a fascist putsch had occurred. The importance of the anti-parliamentarist activity of far-rightist leagues was undeniable. Some of them, such as the Francisque, had copied all of their characteristics from the Italian Fascio leagues which had marched on Rome in 1922, thus resulting in the imposition of the fascist regime. Although historian Serge Bernstein has showed that Colonel de la Rocque had probably been convinced of the necessity of respecting constitutional legality, this was not true of all members of his Croix-de-feu society, which also shared, at least superficially, some characteristics of the fascist leagues, in particular their militarism and fascination for parades.

On 9 February 1934, a socialist and communist counter-demonstration occurred while Daladier was being replaced by Doumergue. Nine people were killed during incidents with the police forces. On 12 February the trade union Confédération générale du travail (CGT) (reformist, with some associations with the Socialist Party) and the Confédération générale du travail unitaire (CGTU) (revolutionary, and associated with the communist party) decided to organize a one-day general strike, while the socialist party Section française de l'Internationale ouvrière (SFIO) and the communist party opted for a separate demonstration. However, at the initiative of the popular base of these societies, the demonstrations finally united themselves into one. Thus, this day marked a first tentative union between the socialists and the communists. It had at its core the anti-fascism shared by both Marxist parties; a union had been opposed since the division of the 1920 Tours Congress, but this new rapprochement resulted in the 1936 Popular Front (consisting of radicals and socialists and endorsed without participation in the government by the Communist party). This antifascist union was in accordance with Stalin's directives to the Comintern, which had asked the European communist parties to ally with other leftist parties, including social-democrats and socialists, in order to block the contagion of fascist and anti-communist regimes in Europe.

Furthermore, several anti-fascist organizations were created after the riots, such as the Comité de vigilance des intellectuels antifascistes (Watchfulness Committee of Antifascist Intellectuals, created in March 1934) which included philosopher Alain, ethnologist Paul Rivet and physicist Paul Langevin. The anarchists also participated with many antifascist actions.

=== The radicalization of the rightists ===
After the crisis, the parliamentary rightists also began to get closer to the counter-revolutionary far rightists. Several of its main activists would lose all trust in parliamentary institutions. Daniel Halévy, a French historian of Jewish ancestry, publicly declared that since 6 February 1934 he was now a "man of the extreme right". Although he personally abhorred Italian fascism or German national socialism, he later endorsed the Pétain regime of Vichy. The radicalization of the rightists would accelerate after the election of the Popular Front in 1936 and the Spanish Civil War (1936–39).

The American journalist John Gunther wrote in 1940 that the Croix-de-feu "could easily have captured the Chamber of Deputies. But [de la Rocque] held his men back. 'France wasn't ready,' he explained". It was possible, Gunther said, that "like Hitler, he hopes to gain power by legal means". To the far rightists, 6 February represented a failed opportunity to abolish the Republic, which only presented itself again in 1940 after the balance had been changed by the étrange défaite (Marc Bloch) or "divine surprise" (Charles Maurras), that is the 1940 defeat during the Battle of France against Germany. This deception prompted several far-right members to radicalize themselves, endorsing fascism, Nazism, or the wartime Vichy regime.

Despite the claims of the leftists, the 6 February crisis was not a fascist conspiracy. The far-rightist leagues were not united enough and most of them lacked any specific objectives. However, their violent methods, their paramilitary appearances, their cult of leadership, etc., explained why they have often been associated with fascism. Other than these appearances, however, and their will to see the parliamentary regime replaced by an authoritarian regime, historians René Rémond and Serge Bernstein do not consider that they had a real fascist project. Opposing this opinion, other historians, such as Michel Dobry or Zeev Sternhell, considered them as being fully fascist leagues. Brian Jenkins claimed it was pointless to seek a fascist essence in France and preferred to make comparisons which resulted, according to him, in a convergence between Italian fascism and the majority of the French leagues, in particular the Action Française (in other words, Jenkins considers fascism an Italian historic phenomenon, and though a fascist-like philosophy existed in France, it should not be termed "fascist" as that name should be reserved for Benito Mussolini's politics).

== See also ==
- Battle of Cable Street
- Bonus March
- Cartel des gauches
- Comité de vigilance des intellectuels antifascistes
- Far-right leagues
- French Third Republic (1870–1940)
- Geneva fusillade of 9 November 1932
- Interwar France
- January 6 United States Capitol attack
