= Stavisky =

Stavisky...
- French theatrical release poster
- Directed by: Alain Resnais
- Written by: Jorge Semprún
- Produced by: Alain Belmondo
- Starring: Jean-Paul Belmondo
- Cinematography: Sacha Vierny
- Music by: Stephen Sondheim
- Production companies: Cérito-Films, Les Films Ariane (Paris); Euro-International (Rome)
- Distributed by: C.C.F.C
- Release date: May 15, 1974
- Running time: 120 min.
- Countries: France; Italy
- Language: French
- Box office: $7.6 million

Stavisky... is a 1974 French biographical drama film based on the life of the financier and embezzler Alexandre Stavisky and the circumstances leading to his mysterious death in 1934. This gave rise to a political scandal known as the Stavisky Affair, which led to fatal riots in Paris, the resignation of two prime ministers and a change of government. The film was directed by Alain Resnais and featured Jean-Paul Belmondo as Stavisky and Anny Duperey as his wife, Arlette. Stephen Sondheim wrote the film's musical score.

== Plot ==
The core narrative of the film portrays the last months in the life of Serge Alexandre (Stavisky), from late 1933 to January 1934. We see glimpses of his operations as a "financial consultant", setting up a mysterious company to deal in international bonds, his 'laundering' of stolen jewellery, and his juggling of funds to stave off the discovery of fraudulent bonds that he has sold through the Crédit Municipal in Bayonne (municipal pawnbrokers); we see his activity as a theatre impresario in Paris, his casino gambling, his purchase of influence among the press, the police, and politicians, and always his extravagant lifestyle and desire to impress; we see his devotion to his glamorous wife Arlette, his exploitation of her beauty to lure funds from a Spanish revolutionary fascist, his contradictory accounts to his friends of events in his own past, and gleams of political idealism - which may yet be just expedients to create further webs of deception.

Interposed in the narrative are moments of flashback (to his teenage awakening to a hedonistic life, to his arrest as the petty crook Stavisky in 1926, and to his father's suicide after this family dishonour) and flash-forwards (to his funeral, and to the parliamentary enquiry into the Stavisky affair at which his friends and associates testify with varying degrees of honesty).

Also punctuating the main story are scenes depicting the arrival of Trotsky in France to seek political asylum, and his sojourn in various country houses and hotels, receiving visits from left-wing activists. These scenes appear to have no link with the main narrative (apart from two minor characters: the young German-Jewish actress who moves between both stories, and the police-inspector who monitors Trotsky's movements and then also investigates Alexandre), until the end of the film when, in the wake of Stavisky's fall and exposure as a Ukrainian immigrant, a Jew, and a confidant of members of the left-of-centre government, Trotsky's presence is deemed undesirable and he is expelled from the country, while a new 'government of national unity' is formed.

The death of Alexandre/Stavisky in a chalet in Chamonix becomes a further mystery: either a suicide by gunshot, like that of his father, or an assassination by the security forces to ensure his silence.

== Background ==
The film began as a commission by Jean-Paul Belmondo to the screenwriter Jorge Semprún to develop a scenario about Stavisky. Resnais, who had previously worked with Semprún on La guerre est finie, expressed his interest in the project (after a gap of six years since his previous film); he recalled seeing as a child the waxwork figure of Stavisky in the Musée Grevin, and immediately saw the potential of Belmondo to portray him as a mysterious, charming and elegant fraudster.

Semprún described the film as "a fable upon the life of bourgeois society in its corruption, on the collaboration of money and power, of the police and crime, a fable in which Alexander's craziness, his cynicism, act as catalysts".

Resnais said: "What attracted me to the character of Alexandre was his connection to the theatre, to show-business in general. Stavisky seemed to me like an incredible actor, the hero of a serial novel. He had the gift of bringing reality to his fantasies by means of regal gestures." (Among many theatrical references, the film features a scene in the theatre in which Alexandre rehearses a scene from Giraudoux's Intermezzo, and another in which he attends a performance of Coriolanus. His office is adorned with theatrical posters.)

== Production ==
Location shooting took place in and around Paris and in Biarritz during autumn 1973. Resnais said that he wanted to film and edit the motion picture in the way that a 1930s film-maker would have done it, using only the camera set-ups and movements that might have been seen in 1930. He also acknowledged an influence from silent cinema in the way that intertitles were used.

The first screening of the film was given at the Cannes film festival in May 1974. After this performance further distribution was delayed when Stavisky's son sought to have the film seized in a legal action against the producers of the film because of its depiction of the relationship between Alexandre Stavisky and his wife.

== Cast ==
- Jean-Paul Belmondo as Serge Alexandre Stavisky
- François Périer as Albert Borelli, Alexandre's dourly efficient and ever-present lawyer
- Anny Duperey as Arlette, Alexandre's glamorous wife
- Michael Lonsdale as Doctor Mézy, Alexandre's physician and friend
- Roberto Bisacco as Juan Montalvo de Montalbon
- Claude Rich as Inspector Bonny, the relentless and not wholly disinterested investigator of Alexandre's frauds
- Charles Boyer as Baron Jean Raoul, a genial right-wing aristocrat who becomes Alexandre's loyal friend
- Pierre Vernier as Pierre Grammont
- Marcel Cuvelier as Inspecteur Boussaud
- Jacques Spiesser as Michel Grandville
- Michel Beaune as The journalist
- Niké Arrighi as Edith Boréal
- Raymond Girard as Doctor Pierre
- Gigi Ballista as Gaston Henriet
- Yves Brainville as Monsieur de la Salle
- Niels Arestrup as Rudolph
- François Leterrier as André Malraux

Gérard Depardieu appears in a small role, the first of his several performances for Resnais, as a young inventor of the Matriscope, a device for determining the sex of a child in the womb, to which Alexandre impulsively gives his financial backing.

== Reception ==
With its high production-values and the popularity of its star actor, the film was enthusiastically received by the public in France, whereas, perhaps for the same reasons, it drew a cool response from many critics who felt that Resnais had betrayed his reputation for intellectual rigour.

A British reviewer expressed several of the doubts which were felt by critics: "No one could fail to respond to the elegance of the fashion-plate costumes, the Art Deco interiors, the gleaming custom-built cars, the handsome grand hotels, and so on, all paraded before us to the tinkling thirties-pastiche foxtrot music of Stephen Sondheim... But Resnais's and Semprún's Stavisky is just not a very interesting figure... what he represents to the film's authors is not clear... What the picture does not do is use the Stavisky affair to make any larger comment upon the drift of twentieth-century life, or capitalist society, or even human gullibility... One's ultimate impression of the film is of an immense gap between the sophistication of its technique and the commonplace simple-minded notions it purveys."

The theme of uncertainty in a fragmented narrative (previously explored by Resnais among equally elegant surroundings in L'Année dernière à Marienbad) was identified by a more sympathetic American reviewer, though with some reservations about the density of the historical background: "The difficulty of knowing what is true, of discovering what really happened, ripples throughout Alain Resnais's "Stavisky" — a spell-casting mood piece that is also factually frustrating. Ideally, it should be possible to relish this fascinating movie on its own. But, since so little French history of the nineteen-thirties is provided, it's likely to send you flying to the library.... Despite its mystifications, Stavisky is one of the most rewarding films I've seen this year—and also one of the most intelligent."

Robert Benayoun, Resnais's commentator and friend, writing some years later, felt that his intentions in the film had been widely misunderstood, especially by those who looked for a politically engaged analysis of a crucial period in French history and found instead a retreat into nostalgia. For Benayoun, Resnais had seen in Stavisky a Faustian archetype, haunted by visions of his oncoming death, who fights to hold on to his 'empire' ("Alexander the Great"), resorting to every kind of illusion and delusion to gain more time for himself. The kaleidoscopic method of the narrative, its theatricality and romanticism provided the director with exactly the tools to represent the dazzling and elusive career of this "sublime crook". He concluded that Stavisky was perhaps one of the films in which Resnais had engaged himself most personally.

Another critic took up the theme of theatricality in identifying the true subject of the film, as well as linking it to the political background: "It is not a portrait of Stavisky, but of the rôle he sought to play. It is not a study of character, but of a performance. It is not an image of reality, but the analysis of an illusion. By starting precisely from these 'false appearances' which Resnais can liken to those of the pre-war political establishment, what he speaks of here is quite simply the death of an era whose false splendours will be lifted, like a curtain in the theatre, upon the outbreak of fascism in Europe and the Second World War."

Stavisky made Monte Hellman’s top-10 list in the 2012 Sight & Sound polls of the greatest films ever made.

On review aggregator website Rotten Tomatoes, the film holds an approval rating of 79% based on 14 reviews, with an average rating of 7.7/10.

== Awards ==
For his role as Baron Raoul, Charles Boyer was given a special tribute by the jury at the 1974 Cannes Film Festival. He also won a Best Supporting Actor award from the New York Film Critics Circle. It was his last appearance in a French film.

The film was nominated for Best Foreign Language Film by the U.S. National Board of Review.

== Title ==
Resnais's preferred title for the film was Biarritz-Bonheur, referring to the department store which symbolised a certain luxury lifestyle seen in the 1930s, and he continued to use this title in later interviews. However, during filming the distributors insisted that the film should be called Stavisky, a title which Resnais disliked because he thought it would suggest that the film was about the Stavisky affair which only broke out after Stavisky's death. The only concession that he was able to gain was that the title should be written with an ellipsis, as Stavisky..., suggesting something more speculative about the subject rather than a history.

In the UK, where the film premiered on BBC Two ahead of its UK cinema release, the title was rendered without the dots, but the listing contained the explanation that "Alain Resnais' film is not about the Stavisky Scandal which did not break until after Stavisky's death, but about the man himself who became a legend".
