= Pirates (1986 film) =

1986 film by Roman Polanski

- Theatrical release poster
- Directed by: Roman Polanski
- Written by: Gérard Brach; John Brownjohn; Roman Polanski
- Produced by: Tarak Ben Ammar
- Starring: Walter Matthau; Cris Campion; Damien Thomas
- Cinematography: Witold Sobocinski
- Edited by: Hervé de Luze; William Reynolds
- Music by: Philippe Sarde
- Production companies: Cathargo Films; Accent-Cominco
- Distributed by: Cannon Film Distributing (US)
- Release date: 8 May 1986 (Cannes)
- Running time: 112 minutes
- Countries: France; Tunisia; Poland
- Languages: English; French; Spanish
- Budget: $40 million
- Box office: $1,641,825 (US) $6,341,825 (Worldwide)

Pirates is a 1986 adventure comedy film written by Gérard Brach, John Brownjohn and Roman Polanski, and directed by Polanski. It was inspired by Polanski's love of classic pirate films, as well as Disneyland's Pirates of the Caribbean attraction. Polanski began planning the film in 1976 as a follow-up to Chinatown, but production was delayed several times due to lack of funding and Polanski's fleeing the United States to avoid sentencing for his confessed rape of a minor.

It was screened out of competition at the 1986 Cannes Film Festival, and was a box-office bomb, although the costume design was nominated for an Academy Award.

== Plot ==
In 1659, an infamous English pirate Captain Red and his cabin boy Jean-Baptiste, nicknamed "Frog", are lost on a raft in the ocean without food and supplies. They sneak aboard the passing galleon Neptune and are thrown into the brig, where they meet the ship's cook Boomako. Boomako has been imprisoned after being caught attempting to steal a golden Aztec throne that is being secretly transported in the hold. Captain Red becomes obsessed with capturing the throne for himself. Meanwhile, Frog falls in love with Maria Dolores, the niece of Maracaibo's governor, who is travelling on the Neptune as a passenger.

Captain Linares dies and the command of the ship is taken by his ruthless and ambitious first mate, lieutenant Don Alfonso de la Torre, who is also in love with Maria Dolores, although she does not reciprocate his feelings. Red and Frog, put to work along with Neptune's crew, make an attempt at instigating a mutiny. In response, Don Alfonso sentences them to death with a few other mutineers. Captain Red launches an open rebellion, which proves successful.

Putting himself in command of the Neptune, Captain Red directs the ship to a pirate cove, led by his old associate Dutch. Meeting his former crewmates, Captain Red throws a party and imprisons Don Alfonso and his officers. However, one of Dutch's hostages releases them while the pirates are partying. Don Alfonso and his men return to the Neptune and retake the ship, sailing away with the golden throne in the morning. Using the money that he has gained from Dutch, Captain Red purchases an old brig and pursues the Neptune to Maracaibo.

At night, Captain Red, Frog and Boomako sneak into the governor's residence with Maria Dolores as their hostage. Red plans to use her as a bargaining chip and force her wealthy uncle to exchange her for the golden throne. Although the governor proves to be unsympathetic for his niece's fate, he becomes more cooperative after Captain Red tortures him instead, finding out that he is suffering from gout.

As Red demands, the governor provides him with a document that entitles him to confiscate the golden throne while posing as the governor's secret messenger. However, Red and Frog fail to carry the throne out of the bay and are captured by Don Alfonso, who puts them in prison. Maria Dolores visits them in their cell. She reveals her feelings toward Jean-Baptiste as the two embrace and share a kiss. Maria Dolores returns to the Neptune, which soon sets off to Spain again, with Don Alfonso promoted to captain.

The pirates, informed by Boomako of what has happened, assault the prison the following night, releasing Red and Frog. Captain Red pursues the Neptune and launches an assault on the galleon. Red sinks his own ship, making retreat impossible, and secretly orders Boomako to prepare a boat to make off with the golden throne. In the heat of battle, Frog finds Maria Dolores and duels with Don Alfonso over her. However, in the end, he remains loyal to Captain Red, abandoning the fight with Don Alfonso to aid his leader in capturing the throne.

With the Neptune burning and beyond repair, her remaining crew and passengers flee on the boat while Red, Frog, and Boomako get away in one of their own with the golden throne in their possession. With Maria Dolores out of his reach, a furious Frog throws insults at Don Alfonso, who tries to shoot him in retaliation. However, Maria Dolores intervenes desperately, disrupting his aim, and Boomako is shot dead instead. Red and Frog leave the scene, abandoning their surviving crewmates in the water.

== Cast ==
- Walter Matthau as Captain Thomas Bartholomew Red
- Cris Campion as Jean-Baptiste / The Frog
- Charlotte Lewis as María Dolores Eugenia del Alcalde
- Roy Kinnear as "Dutch"
- Roger Ashton-Griffiths as Moonhead
- Damien Thomas as Don Alfonso de Salamanca de la Torre
- Olu Jacobs as Boomako
- Ferdy Mayne as Captain Linares
- David Kelly as Surgeon
- Anthony Peck as Anthony Dawnson, The Spanish Officer
- Anthony Dawson as Spanish Officer
- Richard Dieux as Spanish Officer
- Jacques Maury as Spanish Officer
- José Santamaría as Master At Arms
- Robert Dorning as Commander of Marines
- Luc Jamati as Pepito González
- Emilio Fernández as Angelito
- Władysław Komar as Jesus
- Richard Pearson as Padre
- Ian Dury as "Meat Hook"
- Sydney Bromley as Diddler
- Michael Elphick as Sentry
- Georges Montillier as Duenna
- Tony Peck as Spanish Officer
- Bill Stewart as Ginge
- Georges Trillat as Pockmarked Sailor
- David Foxxe as Cook
- Eugeniusz Priwieziencew as Hunchback
- Cardew Robinson as Lawyer
- Bill Fraser as The Governor
- Daniel Emilfork as Hendrik
- Carole Fredericks

== Development ==
Riding on the success of the highly acclaimed Chinatown, Roman Polanski began to write a screenplay for a swashbuckling adventure film called Pirates alongside his regular collaborator Gerard Brach.

"I feel like doing something entertaining," he said in 1976. "I feel like doing something I would like to see. I'm a great customer of Disneyland. Everytime I go on the pirates' ride I think I would like to do a film."

Polanski recalled that, at the time, "movies were very much loaded with messages and the desire to educate. Pirates was somehow a reaction to that," he said later. "I think the young audience will enjoy it more than the adults, and that's really what I intended."

Originally, Polanski intended for Jack Nicholson to play the central role of Captain Thomas Bartholomew Red, a grizzled old pirate, and Polanski would play Red's sidekick. However, complications arose partially due to the enormous fees that Nicholson was demanding. (According to Polanski, when Nicholson was asked what exactly he wanted, he replied, "I want more.") Robert Shaw was also considered but chose to make Swashbuckler (1976) instead.

Polanski also wanted Isabelle Adjani to play the female lead. When production was postponed, he made The Tenant instead, which he rewrote for Adjani. In 1976, he said that he aimed to make Pirates the following year in England and Malta, and that he would act in the film but play only a small role.

By December 1976, United Artists were having second thoughts with the film due to the budget and casting issues. It was also probably impacted by the poor performance of Swashbuckler. Production was postponed further after Polanski was arrested in California in 1977 on charges including rape by use of drugs of a minor. Polanski subsequently fled the United States.

While in France, Polanski made Tess. In September 1980, he announced that he had signed a deal with Filmways to make Pirates. In October, Arnon Milchan announced that he would produce the film, which would be shot in Tel Aviv the following year at a budget of $24 million. Milchan would build a studio there at a cost of $2.5 million, which would have a marine tank. The film would have no major names, as all the money would go into special effects and the set. Polanski called the film "a comedy adventure, in the style of 'Treasure Island' or that Disneyland pirate ride, the kind of thing you dream of as a child". Co-writer Brach called it "a classical, stereotypical story, on which I worked very hard in order not to do something foolish".

Polanski's legal issues meant that the film could not be made in the US. He said:

The people who finance films don't care what your personal problems are, your image, whatever. They're interested in figures. They look them up the same way an insurance company does. And they know that if they spend $5 million or $6 million, $10 million on a film by me, their risk is quite limited. But once you have a subject complicated, more ambitious, like Pirates, even if you have a delightful script and great enthusiasm, even if you promise them heaven, they are afraid. That has nothing to do with my legal problems in America. What do they care for it? Do you think that they have a moral streak in them, that they really hesitate?

=== Tarak Ben Ammar ===
Both Filmways and Milchan ultimately dropped out. Production restarted in Paris, this time with a different production company, Carthago Films, and a new producer, Tarak Ben Ammar, who had pioneered Tunisia as a filming location.

In May 1983, Universal Studios agreed in a memo to provide two-thirds of the budget of Pirates, then estimated at $28 million. Six months later, there was a studio shake-up, and Universal pulled out. By this stage, Ben Ammar had already invested $8 million. He could not find a new distributor.

As late as January 1984, Polanski still hoped to cast Jack Nicholson. Nastassja Kinski, who had been in Polanski's Tess, was going to be the female lead.

Two months before production began, Dino de Laurentiis, who would release the film in Europe, arranged a deal with MGM/UA worth $9.5 million. Ben Ammar raised the additional funding from three other banks.

"I really feel like making a film for a young audience," said Polanski shortly before filming. "Gerard and I have got a great script. It's exciting and it's funny and I expect to have a wonderful time making it. We're using the stereotypes and cliches of old pirate movies and books such as Treasure Island to explain the whole mythology so dear to kids."

By February 1984, Michael Caine was attached as the lead. By April, Caine was out and Rob Lowe was being discussed as his sidekick. Eventually, Walter Matthau agreed to play the lead, and Cris Campion, a French rock drummer, signed on as his sidekick.

"I didn't like the script," said Matthau. "I didn't understand the script. First it was the ship against the pirates, then the pirates against the ship, then the ship against the pirates. I didn't think it was funny or adventurous or anything. And the thought of swimming and climbing and duelling on one leg for five or six months in Tunisia didn't appeal to me. It was my youngest son Charlie who changed my mind. He said, 'You gotta take it, Poppa. You'll get to work with Roman Polanski, one of the great directors today. It's an open-air part that could change your career.'"

== Filming ==
Filming began in Tunisia in November 1984.

By the time that shooting began, the budget had increased to $40 million; Matthau and Polanski each commanded $1 million, and the galleon built for the film cost $7–8 million, with $10 million spent on constructing two sound stages.

The full scale galleon was built in a shipyard in the port of Port El Kantaoui, situated at the city of Sousse, Tunisia, adjacent to the Tarak Ben Ammar Studios, which had been constructed exclusively for this production. An accurate replica above the waterline, but sporting a steel hull and a 400 HP auxiliary engine, the Neptune was and still is entered into the Tunisian naval registry, and is currently a tourist attraction in the port of Genoa, where its interior can be visited for a 6 euro fee. The galleon was not finished until 21 April 1985, five months later than intended, and ran into a storm.

Filming was extremely problematic, the shoot cursed by poor weather and a number of accidents. "Another producer might have torn his hair out by now, or developed an ulcer or swallowed lots of tranquilizers," said Ben Ammar during the shoot. "But it's only a movie... Sure it's important to me that Pirates be a hit, but it's also important that by building the boat in this country, where unemployment stands at around 20 percent, I gave 2,400 people work for two years. Yes, Polanski does seem to be disaster-prone, but his talent is so great that wonderful actors like Matthau and the top European technicians all wanted to work here with him. Pirates is giving my staff lessons in filmmaking money couldn't buy."

"I find Polanski riveting and fascinating," said Matthau. "He's like an orchestra conductor. He gives you a sound, but you play it as you want. If you get inspired, he leaves you alone. This is an extreme example, but if you could get a black cat to jump onto your neck, he'd put it in the movie."

Ammar and fellow producer Thom Mount were unhappy with the involvement of MGM/UA and eventually raised the funds to buy them out of the film. Cannon Films agreed to distribute.

== Release ==
The film opened the 1986 Cannes Film Festival.

=== Box office ===
The film's original estimated budget while Polanski was aligned with Paramount on the picture was $15 million, but the final budget is estimated to have been US$40 million. The reported gross box-office revenue in the United States was $1.64 million, and $6.3 million worldwide.

Cannon Films outbid outside film distributors Metro-Goldwyn-Mayer and De Laurentiis Entertainment Group to serve as the American distributor of the film.

"We make mistakes," said Globus of Cannon. "Pirates was one of them. ... We will lose $1 million or $2 million. ... It hurts. It teaches us a very big lesson that we should not even take for distribution a picture which we don't have all the rights."

=== Critical reception ===
"For character and atmosphere I would give it four stars," said Matthau. "I would not give it four stars for plot and action. I will say that Polanski is a genius for making an atmosphere seem real. Most films have a counterfeit quality to them."

Colin Greenland reviewed Pirates for White Dwarf #85, and stated that "Polanski being Polanski has made everything look so disgusting and filthy and diseased it's also too realistic, if anything. There's a bit where the desperado duo are forced to eat a boiled rat – oh you've heard about that bit, have you?"

On Rotten Tomatoes, the film holds a 25% approval rating, based on 12 reviews, with an average rating of 4.2/10. On Metacritic, the film has a weighted average score of 32 out of 100, based on 12 critics, indicating "generally unfavorable" reviews. Audiences polled by CinemaScore gave the film an average grade of "C-" on an A+ to F scale.

=== Accolades ===
The film was nominated for an Academy Award for Best Costume Design.

== See also ==
- List of biggest box office bombs
- Cutthroat Island, another high-profile pirate film that was not a major success.
