= Charlemagne, le prince à cheval =

1993 miniseries by Clive Donner

Charlemagne, le prince à cheval is a 1993 television miniseries about the life of Charlemagne. A French-Portuguese-Italian-Luxembourgish coproduction, the series was directed by Clive Donner; it was his final project before his death in 2010.

== Premise ==
Based primarily on an intimate contemporary biography written by the courtier Einhard, it consists of 3 episodes and covers the period from the death of Charlemagne's father Pepin the Short in AD 768 to his coronation as the first Holy Roman Emperor on Christmas Day, AD 800.

=== Historical accuracy ===
There is a minor anachronism regarding Saxon leader Widukind's surrender and conversion to Christianity, which in reality did not occur until AD 807 or 808.

== Cast ==
- Christian Brendel, as Charlemagne
- Anny Duperey, as Bertrada of Laon
- Lino Capolicchio, as Pope Leo III
- André Oumansky, as Pepin the Short
- Gilles Gaston-Dreyfus, as Einhard
- Xavier Deluc, as Roland
- Corinne Touzet, as Irène
- Paolo Bonacelli, as Vitale
- Vanni Corbellini, as Ganelon
- Pierre Anais, as Turpin
- Nils Tavernier, as Carloman I
- Anne De Broca, as Gerberga, Queen of the Franks
- Dominic Gould
- Carole Richert, as Himiltrude
- Cris Campion, as Pepin the Hunchback
- Sergio Fantoni, as Pope Adrian I
- Frank Finlay, as Alcuin of York
- Remo Girone, as King Desiderius
- Helmut Griem, as Widukind

== Reception ==
MediaFilm presents it as follows: "Verbose story while the historical context is evoked with clarity. Uneven dramatic intensity. Sumptuous film direction. Actors playing naturally."

== See also ==
- List of historical drama films
