= Field of Honor (1987 film) =

- Film poster
- Directed by: Jean-Pierre Denis
- Written by: Hubert Aupetit; Jean-Pierre Denis; Françoise Dudognon; Christian Faure
- Produced by: Thierry Brissaud
- Starring: Cris Campion
- Cinematography: François Catonné
- Edited by: Geneviève Winding
- Music by: Michel Portal
- Distributed by: Acteurs Auteurs Associés
- Release date: 16 September 1987
- Running time: 87 minutes
- Country: France
- Language: French

Field of Honor (French: Champ d'honneur) is a 1987 French war film directed by Jean-Pierre Denis. It was entered into the 1987 Cannes Film Festival.

== Plot ==
In France, impoverished sharecropper Pierre (Cris Campion) is spared military service when he draws an exemption via a draft lottery. Needing money more than his freedom, however, Pierre sells his exemption to the son of wealthy aristocrat Arnaud (Eric Wapler), taking the son's place in the draft. When the Franco-Prussian War erupts, Pierre finds himself wounded inside enemy territory and gains an unlikely ally in a German soldier who also entered the war as a replacement.

== Cast ==
- Cris Campion as Pierre Naboulet
- Pascale Rocard as Henriette
- Eric Wapler as Arnaud Florent
- Frédéric Mayer as The Child
- André Wilms as The peddler
- Marcelle Dessalles as Pierre's Mother
- Marion Audier as Pierre's Sister
- Robert Sandrey as Florent's Father
- Lily Genny as Florent's Mother
- Louis-Marie Taillefer as Gang Leader
- François Segura as Roger
- Jacques Arne
- Jean-Pierre Beaudeau
- Gisèle Boubou
