= Jean Hérold-Paquis =

French journalist (1912–1945)

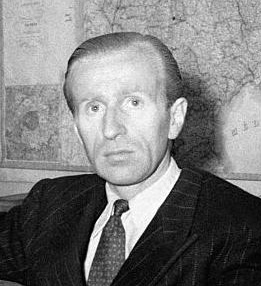
Jean Hérold-Paquis photographed during his first interrogation at the Sûreté, Paris, 12 July 1945.

Jean Auguste Hérold, better known as Jean Hérold-Paquis (4 February 1912 – 11 October 1945) was a French journalist who fought for the Nationalists during the Spanish Civil War.

In 1940 he was appointed as Delegate for Propaganda in the Hautes-Alpes department by the Vichy authorities. From 1942, he broadcast daily news reports on Radio Paris, in which he regularly called for the "destruction" of the United Kingdom. His catch phrase was "England, like Carthage, shall be destroyed!" He was a member of the French Popular Party, better known as the PPF, one of the two main Fascist parties under the Occupation.

After the Liberation, he fled to Germany and then Switzerland. In 1945, he was handed over to the French, and subsequently executed for treason on 11 October 1945 at the Fort de Châtillon.

== See also ==
- Hanoi Hannah
- Lord Haw-Haw
- Tokyo Rose
- Axis Sally
- Francis Stuart
- Stuttgart traitor
