= The Return of Monte Cristo (1968 film) =

- Directed by: André Hunebelle
- Written by: Michel Lebrun; Jean Halain; André Hunebelle
- Produced by: André Hunebelle
- Starring: Paul Barge; Claude Jade; Anny Duperey; Pierre Brasseur
- Cinematography: Raymond Lemoigne
- Edited by: Colette Lambert
- Music by: Michel Magne
- Production company: Produzioni Atlas Consorziate
- Distributed by: Compagnie Française de Distribution Cinématographique (CFDC)
- Release date: 11 December 1968
- Running time: 90 minutes
- Countries: France, Italy
- Language: French

The Return of Monte Cristo (French: Sous le signe de Monte-Cristo, lit. 'Under the Sign of Monte Cristo') is a 1968 French adventure film directed by André Hunebelle starring Paul Barge, Claude Jade, Anny Duperey, Pierre Brasseur and Michel Auclair. One hundred fifty years after Alexandre Dumas' hero, Edmond Dantès escapes from prison by trading places with a dead man. He is in South America, desperately trying to put his life back together while, back in France, they're plotting against him. In 1968, he miraculously manages to return to France... to get even.

== Plot ==
Edmond Dantes (Paul Barge), imprisoned in Sisteron for denouncing and allowing the dismemberment of a whole network of resistance, escapes in the company of his friend Bertuccio (Paul Le Person) in 1947 to South America. But the wreckage of the plane was soon rescued near Brazil and the two fugitives are considered dead. They save the life of a young girl, Linda (Claude Jade), and her father Louis (Gabriel Gascon) in the wilderness. One day Linda is kidnapped. The bandits seek to do violence. The release ended with the murdering of her father. Dantes and Bertuccio promise to never abandon Linda. The years pass, but the chances of their misfortune lead them to meet a drunk man, Faria (Pierre Brasseur), who claims to hold a treasure. Two days later the three men and Linda set off for the mountains, carrying high explosives needed to clear a path to the location of treasure ... Rich, with a new name Christian Montes, Edmond introduced into the environment where Morcerf (Raymond Pellegrin) - who married Edmond's bride Maria (Anny Duperey) - and Villefort (Michel Auclair) and live luxuriously thanks to the millions stolen that enabled their success. He finds the informant confirms her suspicions and draws in a trap the two instigators of the felony. Linda brings a snare to the master Villefort, who wants to kill Edmond for a second time...

The film that marked the beginning of the career in the late sixties for young actresses Claude Jade and Anny Duperey, who went on to become leading stars of French cinema, particularly in the 1970s, is available at Apple TV

== Cast ==
- Paul Barge - Edmond Dantès
- Claude Jade - Linda
- Anny Duperey - Maria
- Pierre Brasseur - Faria
- Paul Le Person - Bertuccio
- Michel Auclair - Villefort
- Raymond Pellegrin - Morcerf
- Jean Saudray - Carderousse
- Gabriel Gascon - Louis
