= Jeunesses Patriotes =

Far-right league of France

Young Patriots
- Jeunesses patriotes
- Emblem of the Jeunesses patriotes
- Other name: National and Social Republican Party
- Leader: Pierre Taittinger
- Founded: 1924
- Dissolved: 1936
- Merged into: French Popular Party
- Country: France
- Ideology: Fascism; Bonapartism; Nationalism; Authoritarianism; Anticommunism
- Political position: Far-right
- Status: Banned/Inactive
- Size: 100,000 (1934)

The Jeunesses Patriotes ("Young Patriots", JP) were a far-right league of France, recruited mostly from university students and financed by industrialists founded in 1924 by Pierre Taittinger. Taittinger took inspiration for the group's creation in the Boulangist Ligue des Patriotes and Benito Mussolini's Blackshirts.

According to the police, the Jeunesses Patriotes had 90,000 members in the country and 6,000 in Paris in 1932. Its street fighters were led by a retired general named Desofy, and were organized around Groupes Mobiles, paramilitary mobile squads of fifty men, outfitted in blue raincoats and berets. The group stated its willingness to combat the "Red Peril" and the Cartel des Gauches (Left-wing Coalition), and chose to back Raymond Poincaré who came to power after the Cartel des gauches.

The organization retreated in 1926, but made a comeback in 1932, with the Cartel des Gauches's electoral victory, and took part in the 6 February 1934 riots, an anti-parliamentary street demonstration in Paris in the context of the Stavisky Affair. In 1936, the Popular Front government outlawed the Jeunesses Patriotes and other nationalist groups.

== See also ==
- 6 February 1934 crisis
