= Solidarité Française =

French political party

Solidarité Française ("French Solidarity") was a French far-right league founded in 1933 by the perfume manufacturer François Coty (1874–1934) as the "Parti national corporatif républicain".

After Coty's death, it was commanded by Major Jean Renaud, members dressed in blue shirts, black berets and jackboots and shouted the slogan "France for the French".

The movement claimed a strength of 180,000 in 1934, with 80,000 in Paris, but the Paris police thought the number in the city to be closer to 15,000. The small membership did not, however, isolate the group since it found itself integrated in the loose coalition of far-right movements that included Charles Maurras's Action Française and Pierre Taittinger's Jeunesse Patriotes.

The group gained notoriety during the rally, which later became a riot, during the 6 February 1934 crisis in front of the Palais Bourbon. The group was dissolved by a law adopted by the Popular Front government of Léon Blum in June 1936. Many members of Solidarité Française subsequently joined Jacques Doriot's fascist Parti populaire français (PPF).

== See also ==
- 6 February 1934 crisis
