= Alexandre Stavisky =

French financier and embezzler (1886–1934)

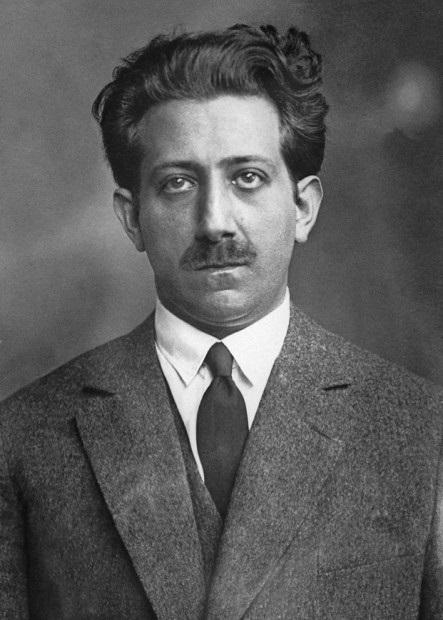
- Alexandre Stavisky in 1926
- Born: 20 November 1886; Slobodka, Kiev Governorate, Russian Empire
- Died: 8 January 1934 (aged 47); Chamonix, France
- Cause of death: Suicide by gunshot
- Resting place: Père Lachaise Cemetery
- Occupation: Financier

Serge Alexandre Stavisky (20 November 1886 – 8 January 1934) was a French financier and embezzler whose actions created a political scandal that became known as the Stavisky Affair.

== Early life ==
Alexandre Stavisky was a Russian Jew born in modern-day Ukraine, whose parents had moved to France.

== Career ==
Stavisky tried various professions, working as a café singer, as a nightclub manager, as a worker in a soup factory, and as the operator of a gambling den. He received French citizenship in 1910. In the 1930s he managed municipal pawnshops in Bayonne but also moved in financial circles. He sold lots of worthless bonds and financed his "hockshop" on the surety of what he called the emeralds of the late Empress of Germany — which later turned out to be glass. In 1927, Stavisky was put on trial for fraud for the first time, charged with swindling millions of francs. However, the trial was postponed again and again, and he was granted bail 19 times.

=== Stavisky affair ===
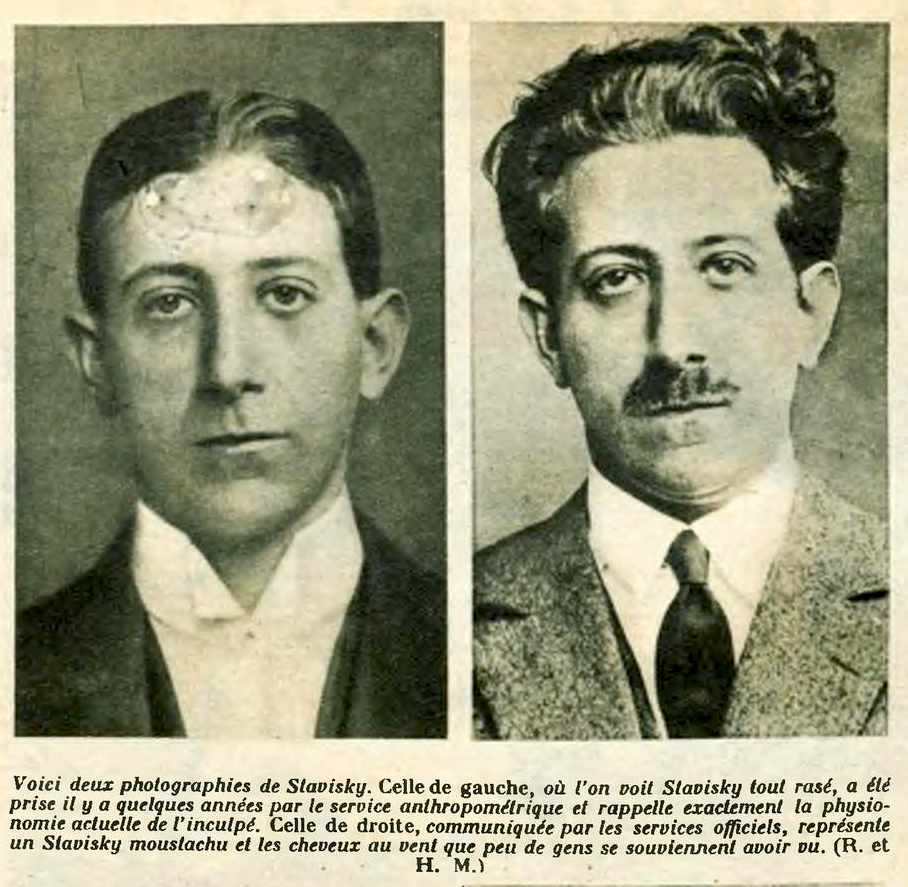
Alexandre Stavisky, Police Magazine, 14 January 1934

Faced with exposure in December 1933, Stavisky fled. Police found him in a Chamonix chalet on 8 January 1934, dying from two gunshot wounds to the head. While surgeons struggled to save the man, he died in the early hours of 9 January. Officially, Stavisky committed suicide, but it was widely speculated that he was murdered to keep him silent. The distance that the bullet had travelled caused the newspaper Le Canard enchaîné to propose sarcastically that Stavisky had "a long arm".

In the aftermath of Stavisky's death there was rioting in the streets of Paris, resulting in 250 arrests on 10 January as news of government involvement in the financial scandal broke. The French premier Camille Chautemps was forced to resign owing to the number of ministers wrapped up in the affair, as well as rumours that he had ordered Stavisky's assassination. An official public enquiry was ordered into the affair. Shortly before it began a senior judge, Albert Prince, who was due to be a witness, was found murdered on a railway line near Dijon, having been tricked into travelling there from Paris by means of a bogus telegram claiming his mother was very ill.

Chautemps was replaced by Radical-Socialist Édouard Daladier, who moved to dismiss right-wing Paris prefect Jean Chiappe and replace him with a government protégé. The decision caused violent far-right riots in Paris on 6 February 1934, resulting in the death of 17 demonstrators and in the resignation of Daladier.

== Legacy ==
Stavisky was buried in Père Lachaise Cemetery in Paris.

The lyrics of the 1934 tango Cambalache contrasts Stavisky and other figures, arriving to the pessimistic conclusion that no one cares to tell good from evil.

Hollywood released a depiction in 1937 with Stolen Holiday, starring Claude Rains as Stavisky's fictional counterpart, Stefan Orloff, and Kay Francis as his wife. Stolen Holiday asserted unequivocally that Orloff was shot by police and his death made to look like a suicide.

In Forces occultes, a film commissioned in 1942 by the "Propaganda Abteilung", a delegation of Nazi Germany's propaganda ministry within occupied France, Stavisky was presented as both a Freemason and a crook.

In 1974, film director Alain Resnais told the story in the film Stavisky... that featured Jean-Paul Belmondo in the title role and Anny Dupérey as his wife Arlette.
