= Anny Duperey =

French actress, photographer and author

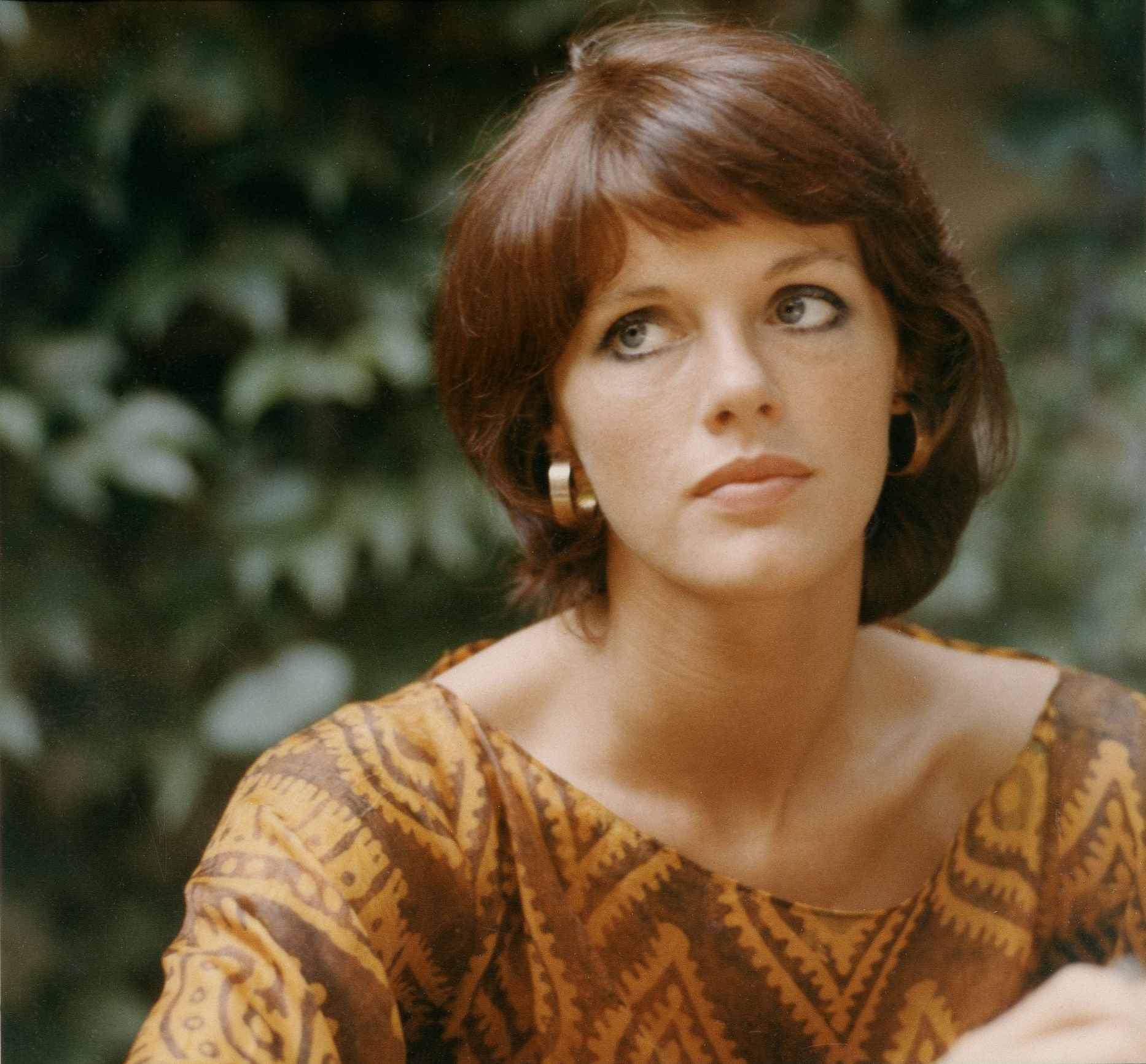
- Anny Duperey in 1971
- Born: Annie Legras; 28 June 1947 (age 79); Rouen, Seine-Maritime, France
- Occupations: Actress, writer
- Years active: 1965–present
- Spouse(s): Bernard Giraudeau (1973–1991) (2 children); Cris Campion (1993–2003)
- Children: Sara Giraudeau; Gaël Giraudeau

Anny Duperey (French pronunciation: [ani dyp(ə)ʁɛ]; born Annie Legras; 28 June 1947) is a French actress, published photographer and best-selling author with a career spanning almost six decades as of 2021 and more than eighty cinema or television credits, around thirty theatre productions and 15 books. She is a five-time Molière Award for Best Actress nominee (known as the French Tony Awards), was awarded two 7 d'Or (equivalent to the Emmy Awards) and was nominated for the César Award for Best Supporting Actress (known as the French Oscars) for Yves Robert's Pardon Mon Affaire (1976). In 1977, she received the Prix Alice-Louis-Barthou awarded by the Académie Française. She is more commercially known for her leading role as Catherine Beaumont in the TF1 hit series Une famille formidable which ran for 15 seasons (1992–2018) regularly topping national primetime viewership numbers and also broadcast throughout French-speaking Europe peaking at 11 million viewers in France alone. Some of her most notable feature films include Jean-Luc Godard's Two or Three Things I Know About Her (1967); Roger Vadim's Spirits of the Dead (1968); André Hunebelle's The Return of Monte Cristo (1968); Alain Resnais' Stavisky (1974); Umberto Lenzi's From Hell to Victory (1979); Henri Verneuil's A Thousand Billion Dollars (1982), Claude Berri's Germinal (1993) or Alain Resnais' You Ain't Seen Nothin' Yet (2012). Her trapeze number for the Gala de l'Union des artistes with Francis Perrin as well as her 'red dress scene' with Jean Rochefort swaying her hips as a nod to Marilyn Monroe on Vladimir Cosma's original score both became cult in French popular culture. She was made a Chevalier (French: Knight) of the Légion d'honneur as part of the French Republic's 2012 New Year decoration class also honouring Hélène Carrère d'Encausse, Maurice Herzog and Salma Hayek. She has been a supporter of the charity SOS Children's Villages since 1993.

== Early life ==
Duperey's family is from La Neuville-Chant-d'Oisel in Normandy. She lost her parents, Lucien and Ginette Legras who were both photographers, at the age of 8 as they accidentally died on 6 November 1955 in Sotteville-lès-Rouen, poisoned by carbon monoxide in their bathroom due to a faulty gas water heater and insufficient ventilation. Following this incident, she was raised by her paternal grandmother. After attending her local theatre conservatory courses, she moved to Paris to attend those of René Simon. She started out as a model and took her first steps on stage in 1965, playing in La Mamma by André Roussin and made her screen debut in Jean-Luc Godard's Two or Three Things I Know About Her (1967).

== Career ==
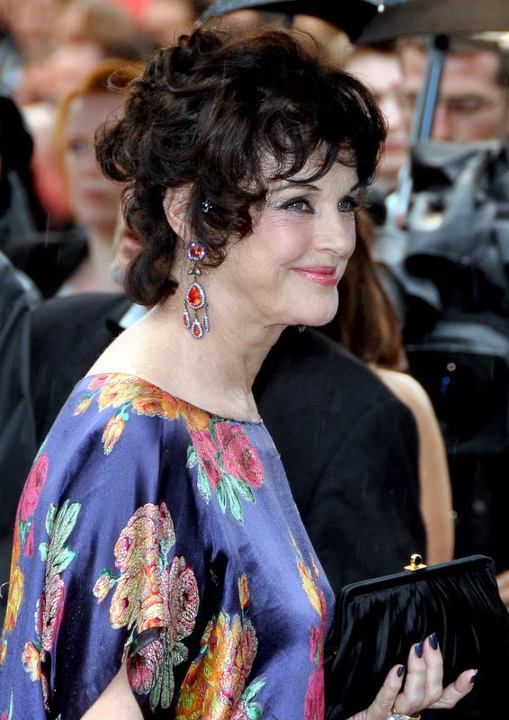
Duperey at the 2012 Cannes Film Festival

She co-starred in two French horror films, Spirits of the Dead (1968) and The Blood Rose (1970).In the 1974 Alain Resnais film Stavisky, she portrayed Arlette, the beautiful real-life wife of flamboyant swindler Alexandre Stavisky played by Jean-Paul Belmondo. Anny Duperey was nominated for the 1977 César Award for Best Actress in a Supporting Role for her performance in "Un éléphant ça trompe énormément" (An Elephant Can Be Extremely Deceptive). For her work in television, she has won two 7 d'Or Best Actress awards. In English-language film, Anny Duperey appeared with Al Pacino in the 1977 Sydney Pollack film Bobby Deerfield. Other notable appearances include Les Compères and TV series since 1992 Une famille formidable.

In fall of 2006, she led in an adaption of Oscar and the Lady in Pink (2002, French: Oscar et la dame rose), a novel written by Éric-Emmanuel Schmitt; she performed at the L'Avant-Seine Theater in Colombes.

== Personal life ==
Her younger sister Patricia died in 2009 of a heart problem. She lived with actor Bernard Giraudeau for fifteen years, they had two children, Gael in 1982 and Sara in 1985. They separated in 1991, and Duperey married Cris Campion in 1993, but they also separated after some ten years. She has called Giraudeau “the man of my life” and Campion “the love of my life”. She is the grandmother of four: Mona (2011) and Bonnie (2016), daughters of Sara, and Romy (2015) and Susanne (2018), daughters of Gael.

== Charity Work ==
A social activist, Anny Duperey has volunteered for causes such as the international child welfare organisation SOS Children's Villages and SOS-PAPA an international organization to help ensure children of divorce have full participation by both parents.

== Filmography ==
=== Feature films ===
| Year | Title | Role | Director | Notes |
|---|---|---|---|---|
| 1967 | Jerk à Istanbul | Apolline | Francis Rigaud | |
| 1967 | L'homme qui valait des milliards | Barbara Novak | Michel Boisrond | |
| 1967 | Two or Three Things I Know About Her | Marianne | Jean-Luc Godard | |
| 1968 | Spirits of the Dead | A Courtesan | Roger Vadim | "Metzengerstein" segment |
| 1968 | The Return of Monte Cristo | Maria | André Hunebelle | |
| 1969 | Les Femmes | Hélène | Jean Aurel | |
| 1969 | Un jeune couple | Ariane | René Gainville | |
| 1969 | Bye bye, Barbara | Aglaé | Michel Deville | |
| 1970 | The Blood Rose | Anne | Claude Mulot | |
| 1972 | Not Dumb, The Bird | Marthe | Jean Delannoy | |
| 1972 | Les malheurs d'Alfred | Agathe Bodard | Pierre Richard | |
| 1973 | L'oiseau rare | Marie-Laure de Porcheville | Jean-Claude Brialy | |
| 1973 | Sans sommation | Cora | Bruno Gantillon | |
| 1974 | Stavisky | Arlette | Alain Resnais | |
| 1975 | Malicious Pleasure | Marianne Malaiseau | Bernard Toublanc-Michel | |
| 1975 | Pas de problème ! | Janis | Georges Lautner | |
| 1975 | Hugs and Other Things | Maria | Jochen Richter | |
| 1976 | Pardon Mon Affaire | Charlotte | Yves Robert | Nominated - César Award for Best Supporting Actress |
| 1977 | L'arriviste | Fluvio's wife | Samy Pavel | |
| 1977 | Golden Night | Andrée | Serge Moati | |
| 1977 | Bobby Deerfield | Lydia | Sydney Pollack | |
| 1978 | Trocadéro bleu citron | Annie | Michaël Schock | |
| 1979 | From Hell to Victory | Fabienne Bodin | Umberto Lenzi | |
| 1980 | Car-napping | Claudia Klessing | Wigbert Wicker | |
| 1981 | Psy | Colette | Philippe de Broca | |
| 1982 | Le Grand Pardon | Carole | Alexandre Arcady | |
| 1982 | Meurtres à domicile | Aurélia Maudru | Marc Lobet | |
| 1982 | A Thousand Billion Dollars | Laura Weber | Henri Verneuil | |
| 1983 | Les Compères | Christine Martin | Francis Veber | |
| 1983 | Le Démon dans l'île | Dr. Gabrielle Martin | Francis Leroi | Fantasporto - Best Actress |
| 1984 | La triche | Nathalie Verta | Yannick Bellon | |
| 1988 | Gandahar | Ambisextra | René Laloux | |
| 1993 | Germinal | Madame Hennebeau | Claude Berri | |
| 1999 | Tôt ou tard | Aline | Anne-Marie Etienne | |
| 2007 | Danse avec lui | Alexandra's mother | Valérie Guignabodet | |
| 2007 | Sous mes yeux | The Grandmother | Stéphanie Vasseur | Short |
| 2008 | De l'autre côté du lit | Lise | Pascale Pouzadoux | |
| 2009 | Bambou | Kaki | Didier Bourdon | |
| 2009 | Eden Is West | Nice woman | Costa-Gavras | |
| 2009 | Les âmes pixellisées | Hélène | Michael Castellanet | Short |
| 2011 | Love Lasts Three Years | Marc's mother | Frédéric Beigbeder | |
| 2012 | You Ain't Seen Nothin' Yet | Eurydice's mother | Alain Resnais | |
| 2019 | Just a Gigolo | Samantha | Olivier Baroux | |
| 2023 | Sur les Chemins Noirs | Hélène | Denis Imbert | |
| 2023 | Le Voyage en pyjama | | Pascal Thomas | |

=== Television ===
| Year | Title | Role | Director | Notes |
|---|---|---|---|---|
| 1965 | L'Examen de passage | The announcer | Lazare Iglesis | |
| 1968 | Sarn | Dorabella | Claude Santelli | TV movie |
| 1968 | Kœnigsmark | Mélusine | Jean Kerchbron | TV movie |
| 1969 | Allô Police | Olga | Adonis A. Kyrou | TV series (1 episode) |
| 1971 | L'Heure éblouissante | Géraldine | Jeannette Hubert | TV movie |
| 1971 | La Brigade des maléfices | Vénusine | Claude Guillemot | TV series (1 episode) |
| 1973 | La dame de trèfle | Isabelle / Ada | Pierre Cavassilas | TV movie |
| 1978 | Un ours pas comme les autres | Anne | Nina Companeez | TV mini-series |
| 1978 | Les Amours sous la Révolution | Aimée de Coigny | Jean-Paul Carrère | TV series (1 episode) |
| 1982 | La Guerre de Troie n'aura pas lieu | Hélène | Raymond Rouleau | TV movie |
| 1988 | La face de l'ogre | Hélène | Bernard Giraudeau | TV movie |
| 1988 | Un château au soleil | Marie-Pierre Beaufroy | Robert Mazoyer | TV mini-series 7 d'Or - Best Actress |
| 1988 | Sentiments | Marie | Jacques Fansten | TV series (1 episode) |
| 1990 | La seconde | Fanny | Christopher Frank | TV movie |
| 1990 | Renseignements généraux | Carole | Philippe Lefebvre | TV series (1 episode) |
| 1992–2018 | Une famille formidable | Catherine Beaumont | Joël Santoni, Miguel Courtois, ... | TV series (56 episodes); 7 d'Or - Best Actress |
| 1994 | Charlemagne, le prince à cheval | Bertrada of Laon | Clive Donner | TV mini-series |
| 1997 | L'enfant perdu | Adrienne | Christian Faure | TV movie |
| 1997–2000 | La vocation d'Adrienne | Adrienne | Joël Santoni | TV series (3 episodes) |
| 1998 | Marseille | Hélène Favier | Didier Albert | TV mini-series |
| 1998 | Le juge est une femme | Camille Vincenot | Pierre Boutron | TV series (1 episode) |
| 1998–1999 | Un et un font six | Judith Guizien | Franck Apprederis | TV series (3 episodes) |
| 1999–2001 | Chère Marianne | Marianne Rivais | Bernard Uzan, Pierre Joassin, ... | TV series (5 episodes) |
| 2001 | Le prix de la vérité | Françoise | Joël Santoni | TV movie |
| 2001 | Un pique-nique chez Osiris | Jenny La Tour | Nina Companeez | TV mini-series |
| 2003 | Le voyage de la grande-duchesse | Alice de Hassenbourg | Joyce Buñuel | TV movie |
| 2005 | Une vie en retour | Yvette Duval | Daniel Janneau | TV movie |
| 2008 | Coco Chanel | Madame Desboutins | Christian Duguay | TV movie |
| 2008 | Clara Sheller | Danièle | Alain Berliner | TV series (6 episodes) |
| 2014 | Marge d'erreur | Rebecca Prieto | Joël Santoni | TV movie |
| 2015 | Un parfum de sang | Marie Versini | Pierre Lacan | TV movie |
| 2017 | Le tueur du lac | Françoise | Jérôme Cornuau | TV mini-series |
| 2019 | Les Secrets du Château | Duchesse Hélène de l’Essile | Claire de La Rochefoucauld | TV movie |
| 2019 | Cassandre | Sophie Vannier | Hervé Renoh | TV series (1 episode) |
| 2019 | Mongeville | Louise Chambord | Dominique Ladoge | TV series (1 episode) |
| 2020 | Grand Hôtel | Suzanne de Marièse | Jérémy Minui & Yann Samuell | TV mini-series |
| 2020 | Calls | Anne | Timothée Hochet | TV series (1 episode) |
| 2021 | Le grand restaurant 3 | The gigolo's client | Romuald Boulanger & Pierre Palmade | TV movie |
| 2021 | Nina | Barbara | Éric Le Roux | TV series (1 episode) |
| 2021–22 | La Faute à Rousseau | Eva Rousseau | Agathe Robilliard, Octave Raspail, ... | TV series (14 episodes) |
| 2022 | Petit Ange | Sybille Delestre | Christian Bonnet | TV movie |
| TBA | Mort d’un berger | Marceline Dalmas | Christian Bonnet | TV movie |

== Theater ==
| Year | Title | Author | Director | Notes |
|---|---|---|---|---|
| 1965 | Les Trois Mariages de Mélanie | Charlotte Frances | Jean Meyer | |
| 1965–67 | La Mamma | André Roussin | André Roussin | |
| 1969 | Liebeskonzil | Oskar Panizza | Jorge Lavelli | |
| 1970 | Jarry sur la butte | Alfred Jarry | Jean-Louis Barrault | |
| 1971 | Isabella, Three Sailing Ships and a Con Man | Dario Fo | Dario Fo | |
| 1971 | The Trojan War Will Not Take Place | Jean Giraudoux | Jean Mercure | |
| 1973 | Twelfth Night | William Shakespeare | Jean Le Poulain | |
| 1974 | Isabella Morra | André Pieyre de Mandiargues | Jean-Louis Barrault | |
| 1977 | Le Nouveau Monde | Auguste Villiers de l'Isle-Adam | Jean-Louis Barrault | |
| 1980 | The Winter's Tale | William Shakespeare | Jorge Lavelli | |
| 1980 | Attention fragile | André Ernotte & Elliot Tiber | André Ernotte | |
| 1981 | L'Amour de l'amour | Apuleius, Jean de La Fontaine & Molière | Jean-Louis Barrault | |
| 1983 | The Girl with Something Extra | Bernard Slade | Pierre Mondy | |
| 1984–85 | Duet for One | Tom Kempinski | Raymond Gérôme | |
| 1986 | La Répétition ou l'Amour puni | Jean Anouilh | Bernard Murat | |
| 1987–89 | Le Secret | Henri Bernstein | Andréas Voutsinas | Nominated - Molière Award for Best Actress |
| 1990 | Le Plaisir de rompre & Le Pain de ménage | Jules Renard | Bernard Murat | Nominated - Molière Award for Best Actress |
| 1994 | When She Danced | Martin Sherman | Patrice Kerbrat | |
| 1995–97 | An Ideal Husband | Oscar Wilde | Adrian Brine | Nominated - Molière Award for Best Actress |
| 2003 | Memoir | John Murrell | Bernard Murat | |
| 2006 | Oscar and the Lady in Pink | Éric-Emmanuel Schmitt | Joël Santoni | Nominated - Molière Award for Best Actress |
| 2010–11 | Colombe | Jean Anouilh | Michel Fagadau | Nominated - Molière Award for Best Actress |
| 2010–12 | Désolé pour la moquette | Bertrand Blier | Bertrand Blier | |
| 2013 | The Madwoman of Chaillot | Jean Giraudoux | Didier Long | |
| 2018 | Les Chats de hasard | Anny Duperey | Ninon Brétécher | |
| 2022 | Mes Chers Enfants | Jean Marboeuf | Jean Marboeuf | |

== Author ==
In addition to her talents as an actress, Duperey is a successful author of a number of bestselling books including L'admiroir (1976), Le Nez de Mazarin (Mazarin's Nose) (1986), Le voile noir (The Black Veil) (1992), Je vous écris (I'm Writing To You) (1993), Les chats de hasard (The fortune cats) (1999), Allons plus loin, veux-tu? (Let's go further, will you?) (2002) Les chats mots (The cats words) (2003) and Une soirée (An evening) (2005).

| Year | Book | Publisher | Notes |
|---|---|---|---|
| 1976 | L'Admiroir | Éditions du Seuil | Novel; Prix Alice-Barthou de l'Académie française |
| 1986 | Le Nez de Mazarin | Éditions du Seuil | Novel |
| 1992 | Le Voile noir | Éditions du Seuil | Autobiography |
| 1993 | Je vous écris | Éditions du Seuil | Autobiography & testimony |
| 1993 | Lucien Legras, photographe inconnu | Éditions du Seuil | Photographs of Lucien Legras (her father) |
| 1999 | Les Chats de hasard | Éditions du Seuil | Story |
| 2002 | Allons voir plus loin, veux-tu ? | Éditions du Seuil | Novel |
| 2003 | Les Chats mots | Éditions Ramsay | Texts & Illustrations with Sonja Knapp |
| 2004 | Essences et Parfums | Éditions Ramsay | Texts |
| 2005 | Une soirée | Éditions du Seuil | Novel |
| 2008 | De la vie dans son art, de l'art dans sa vie | Éditions du Seuil | Correspondence between Anny Duperey & Nina Vidrovitch |
| 2011 | Le Poil et la Plume | Éditions du Seuil | Novel |
| 2017 | Le Rêve de ma mère | Éditions du Seuil | Novel |
| 2018 | Les photos d'Anny | Éditions du Seuil | Novel |
| 2022 | Le Tour des arènes | Éditions du Seuil | Novel |

== Awards and nominations ==
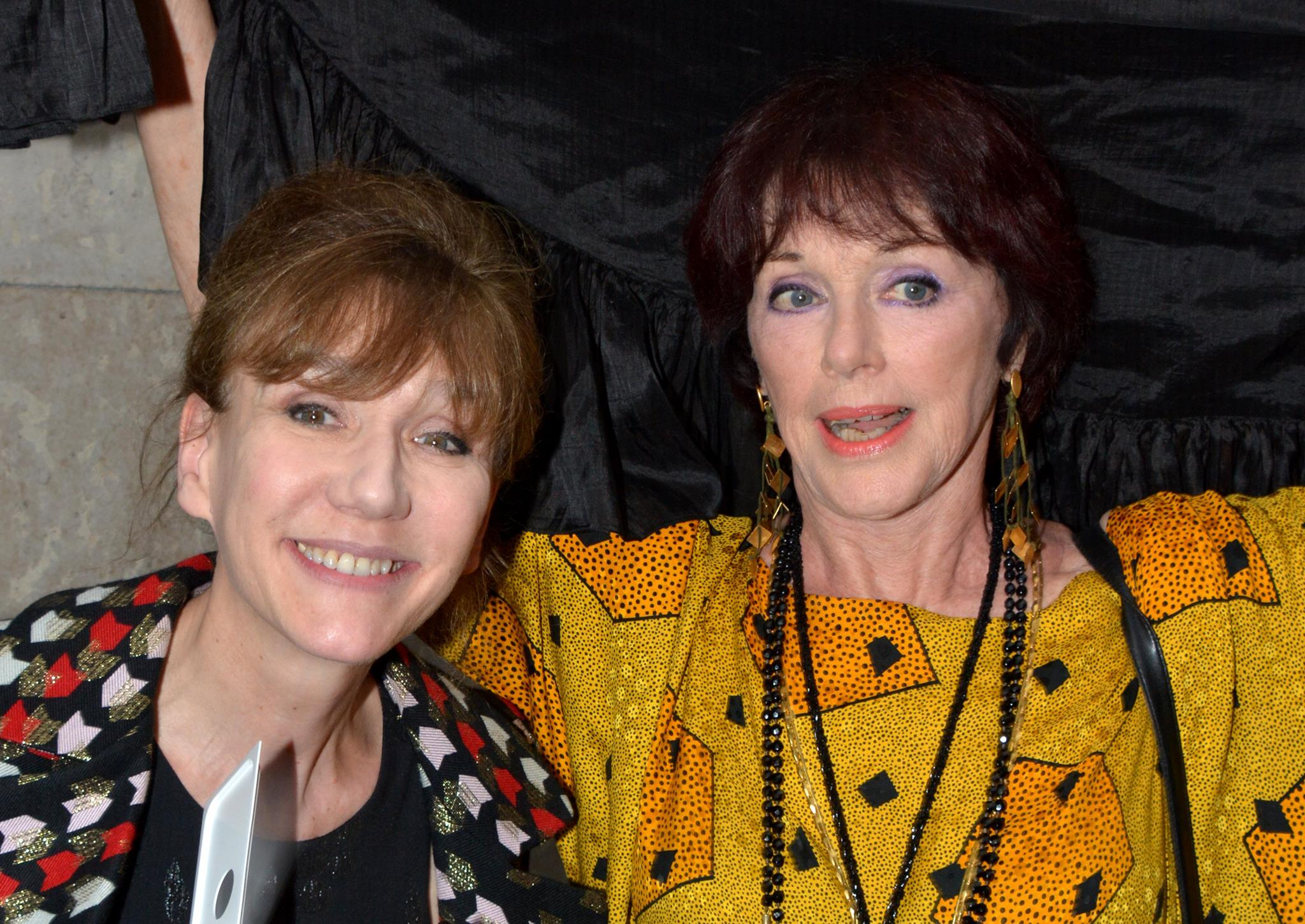
Virginie Lemoine and Duperey at the 2018 Molière Awards.

=== Molière Award ===
| Year | Nominated work | Category | Result |
|---|---|---|---|
| 1988 | Le Secret | Best Actress | Nominated |
| 1990 | Le Pain de ménage & Le Plaisir de rompre | Best Actress | Nominated |
| 1996 | An Ideal Husband | Best Actress | Nominated |
| 2006 | Oscar et la Dame rose | Best Actress | Nominated |
| 2010 | Colombe | Best Actress | Nominated |

=== César Awards ===
| Year | Nominated work | Category | Result |
|---|---|---|---|
| 1977 | Pardon Mon Affaire | Best Supporting Actress | Nominated |
