= Une famille formidable =

French romantic comedy television series

- Created by: Laurent Vachaud; Ève Deboise; Alain Layrac; Danièle Thompson
- Starring: Anny Duperey; Bernard Le Coq
- Country of origin: France
- No. of episodes: 56 (December 2017)

Production
- Running time: 90 minutes (1992-2015); 52 minutes (2016-2018)

Original release
- Network: TF1
- Release: 17 September 1992 – 3 December 2018

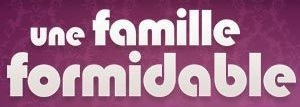
Une famille formidable logo

Une famille formidable (English: A Wonderful Family, literal English title: A marvelous family) is a French romantic comedy television series broadcast since 17 September 1992. It details the goings on of a family, and follows them as they grow up. As of 2008, the cast is the same as the 1992 cast, an unusual feat for a program with a run of this length.

In 2012, during the broadcast of the season 9, twenty years of the series are celebrated.

In 2017, during the broadcast of the season 14, twenty-five years of the series are celebrated.

== Cast members ==
=== Main cast ===
| Actor | Role | Character Duration |
|---|---|---|
| Anny Duperey | Catherine Beaumont (née Mariotti) | Season 1 – 15 |
| Bernard Le Coq | Jacques Beaumont | Season 1 – 15 |
| Cécile Caillaud | Audrey Beaumont | Season 1 – 15 |
| Roméo Sarfati | Nicolas « Nico » Beaumont | Season 1 – 15 |
| Jennifer Lauret | Frédérique « Fred » Bensala (Née Beaumont) | Season 1 – 15 |
| Several young players (2 - 3); Alain Piquet (4 - 6); Geoffrey Sauveaux (7 - 15) | Jérémie Beaumont | Season 2 – 15 |
| Several young players (2 - 3); Marie Sambourg (4- 15) | Manon Beaumont | Season 2 – 15 |

=== Recurring cast ===
| Actor | Role | Character Duration |
|---|---|---|
| Milena Vukotic | Paule Mariotti, Catherine's older sister | Season 1 – 5, 7, 12, 13 |
| Philippe Khorsand | Richard Matisse, Jacques' best friend and Paule's former husband | Season 1 – 7 |
| Alexandre Thibault | Julien Viguier, Audrey's husband and Marie's father | Season 1 – 15 |
| Gabriele Ferzetti | Nono Mariotti, Paule and Catherine's father | Season 1 – 7 |
| Laura Soveral | Francesca Mariotti | Season 1 – 2, 4 |
| Didier Sandre | Michel Morand, Audrey's father and Reine's husband | Season 1 – 3 |
| Emmanuel Montes | Alexis, Nico's best friend | Season 1 – 3 |
| Philippe Dussol | Basile, Nico's friend | Season 1 – 3 |
| Emmanuelle Laforge | Ophélie, Audrey and Nico's friend | Season 1 |
| Sandrine Thomas | Marilyne, Nico's former girlfriend and friend | Season 1, 3 |
| Jean Rouiller | Marc, Alexis’ boyfriend | Season 1 – 3 |
| Janine Souchon | Mme Viguier, Julien and Bruno's mother | Season 1 – 2 |
| Isabelle Renauld | Nelly Fourgerolles | Season 1 – 2 |
| Michel Roger | Serge Mariotti | Season 1 |
| Catherine Spaak (2); Béatrice Agenin (3 - 13) | Reine Grenier | Season 2 – 13 |
| Tristan Calvez | Sébastien Grenier | Season 2 – 8, 10, 13 |
| Frederic Deban | Renaud | Season 2 |
| Beata Nilska | Helena, Nico's former wife | Season 2 – 3 |
| Maxime Leroux | Eric | Season 3 |
| Kamel Belghazi | Nourreddine Bensala, Fred's husband | Season 4 – 15 |
| Several young players (2 - 3); Laura Salvator (4- 15) | Marie Viguier, Audrey and Julien's daughter | Season 2 – 15 |
| Patrick Mazet | Patrick | Season 4 – 5 |
| Sofia Sa da Bandeira | Lucia, José's mother | Season 4 – 5, 7, 10, 12 – 14 |
| Carla Lauret (5); Carla Roger (6); Agathe Bouissières (7-14) | Carla Bensala, Fred and Nourreddine's first daughter | Season 5 – 14 |
| Anne Consigny | Eléonore | Season 5 |
| Zoon Besse | François | Season 4 – 7 |
| Rabah Loucif | Mohamed Bensala, Nourredine's father | Season 4 – 7 |
| Raphaël Baudoin | Guy | Season 5 |
| Marc Samuel | Catherine's psy | Season 5, 7 |
| Marcia Breia | Maria | Season 4, 6 – 7 |
| Sofia Grilo (6 - 7); Emilie Colli (8 - 10, 12) | Patricia Cerraz-Viguier, Julien's second and former wife | Season 6 - 10, 12, 14 |
| Daniel Lobé | Maurice | Season 6 – 7 |
| Anne Malraux | Laura | Season 6 |
| Sandrine Rigaux | Natalia | Season 6, 12 |
| Young actor (4); Marius Ravanello (12); Axel Keravec (13-15) | Louis, Laura and Natalia's son; Laura and Nico's biological son | Season 4, 12 – 15 |
| Jean-Pierre Malignon | Robert Ollier | Season 6 |
| Jean-Baptiste Shelmerdine (season 7 - 10); Gaël Giraudeau (season 11-14) | Jean-Philippe Cazaubon | Season 7 – 14 |
| Martin Jobert | José Beaumont Jacques and Lucia's son | saison 7, 10 – 15 |
| Christophe Sermet | Lucas, Nico's' boyfriend | Season 7 – 10, 12 – 15 |
| Julie Dray (5); Julie de Bona (6 - 8, 10-11, 13 – 14); Sabrina Seyvecou (15) | Christine Grenier, Sebastien's wife and Sammaï's adopted mother | Season 5 - 8, 10-11, 13 – 15 |
| Patrick Préjean | René, Frederique's friend and former colleague | Season 8 – 12, 14 |
| Valentin Ngo (8, 10); Hugo Lim (11 ) Duke Habib (13-14) | Sammaï Grenier, Sébastien and Christine's adopted son | Season 8, 10 – 11, 13 – 14 |
| Laurent Gamelon | François Fabiani | Season 9 – 10 |
| Other player (7); Fanny Krich (10- 15) | Héléna Montes, Jérémie's wife | Season 7, 10 – 15 |
| Other player (1-2); Julien Thiessar (3-4); Karl E. Landler (13-14) | Bruno Viguier, Julien's younger brother | Season 1 –4, 13 – 14 |
| Several young players (14-15) | Inès Bensala, Fred and Nourredine's second daughter | Season 14– 15 |

=== Guest ===
| Actor | Role | Character Duration |
|---|---|---|
| Élise Tielrooy | Ingrid | Season 2 |
| Marie-Christine Adam | Alexis's Mother | Season 2 |
| Assaad Bouab | Walid | Season 7 |
| Franck de la Personne | Director Smartex | Season 9 |
| Stéphane Debac | The scammer | Season 11 |
| Emil Abossolo-Mbo | Ghislain Beaumont | Season 12 – 14 |
