= Serge Berstein =

French historian (born 1934)

- Born: 1934 (age 91–92)

Academic work
- Main interests: French Third Republic

Serge Berstein (born in 1934) is a French historian, well known as a specialist of the French Third Republic.

He is a reader at Institut d'Études Politiques de Paris.
