= Stavisky affair =

Financial scandal in France

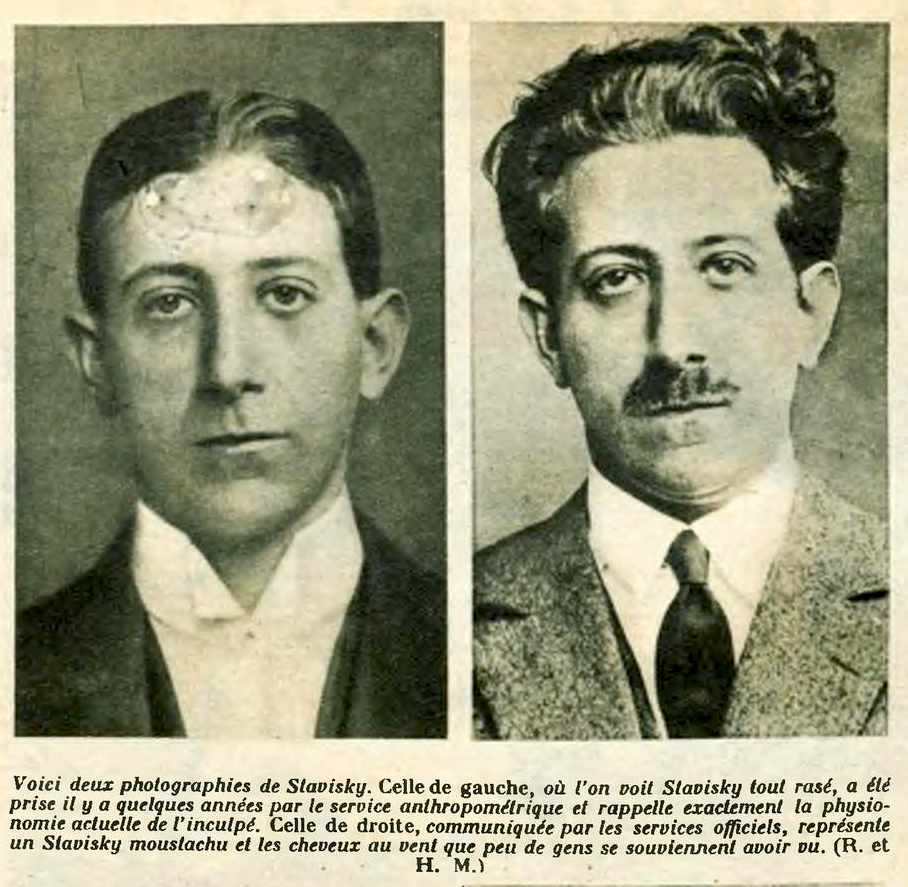
Alexandre Stavisky, Police Magazine, 14 January 1934

The Stavisky affair was a financial scandal in France in 1934, involving embezzler Alexandre Stavisky. The scandal had political ramifications for the Radical-Socialist government after it was revealed that Prime Minister Camille Chautemps had protected Stavisky, who died suddenly in mysterious circumstances.

Political rightists engaged in large anti-government demonstrations on 6 February 1934, which resulted in the Paris police firing upon and killing 17 demonstrators. A right-wing coup d'état seemed like a possibility at the time, but historians agree that the multiple rightist forces were uncoordinated and not trying to overthrow the government.

== Stavisky ==
Serge Alexandre Stavisky (1888–1934), who became known as le beau Sacha ("Handsome Sasha"), was a Russian Jew who was born in modern-day Ukraine; his parents had relocated to France. Stavisky tried various professions, working as a café singer, a nightclub manager, a soup factory worker and as the operator of a gambling den. During the 1930s, he managed municipal pawnshops in Bayonne and also knew people active in the financial sector. Stavisky sold worthless bonds and financed his "hockshop" on the surety of what he called the emeralds of the late Empress of Germany, which were later revealed to be glass.

Stavisky maintained his reputation by using his acquaintances with important people. If a newspaper tried to investigate his affairs, he paid it to stop either with large advertisement contracts or by buying the newspaper's company.

In 1927, Stavisky was put on trial for fraud for the first time. However, the trial was postponed repeatedly, and he was granted bail nineteen times. Stavisky probably continued his scams during that time. One judge who claimed to have secret documents involving Stavisky was later found decapitated. Janet Flanner wrote:

The scheme which finally killed Alexandre Stavisky, his political guests' reputations, and the uninvited public's peace of mind, was his emission of hundreds of millions of francs' worth of false bonds on the city of Bayonne's municipal pawnshop, which were bought up by life-insurance companies, counseled by the Minister of Colonies, who was counseled by the Minister of Commerce, who was counseled by the Mayor of Bayonne, who was counseled by the little manager of the hockshop, who was counseled by Stavisky.

At the risk of exposure in December 1933, Stavisky fled. On 8 January 1934, the police found him in a chalet in Chamonix; he was dead from a gunshot wound. Stavisky was officially determined to have committed suicide, but there was a persistent speculation that police officers had killed him. Fourteen Parisian newspapers reported his death as a suicide, but eight did not. The distance that the bullet had travelled caused the newspaper Le Canard enchaîné to propose sarcastically that Stavisky had "a long arm".

== Political crisis of 6 February 1934 ==
After Stavisky's death, details about his long criminal history, his relations with the French establishment and his controversial death became public. His involvement with so many ministers caused the resignation of Prime Minister Camille Chautemps with accusations from the right-wing opposition that he and his police had killed Stavisky intentionally to protect influential people. The new Prime Minister was Édouard Daladier, and one of his first acts was to dismiss the prefect of the Paris police, Jean Chiappe, who was notorious for his rightist sympathies and suspected of encouraging previous anti-government demonstrations. Daladier then dismissed the director of the Comédie Française, who had been staging William Shakespeare's controversial play Coriolanus, and replaced him with the director of the Sûreté-Générale, a protégé of Chautemps and Daladier's centre-left Radical‐Socialist Party. He also appointed a new Interior Minister, Eugène Frot, who announced that demonstrators would be shot.

The dismissal of Chiappe was the immediate cause of the 6 February 1934 crisis, which some considered as a possible rightist putsch. According to the historian Joel Colton, "The consensus among scholars is that there was no concerted or unified design to seize power and that the police lacked the coherence, unity, or leadership to accomplish such an end". The historian of fascism, René Rémond, described it as "barely a riot... a street demonstration".

However, leftists feared an overt fascist conspiracy. Fomented by several conservative, anti-Semitic, monarchist or fascist groups, including Action Française, the Croix-de-Feu and the Mouvement Franciste, the demonstration occurred on the night of 6–7 February 1934. The police fired upon and killed 17 people.

Daladier was forced to resign. His successor was the conservative Gaston Doumergue, who formed a coalition government. It was the first time during the Third Republic that a government had to resign as a result of riots by the opposition. Other results were the formation of anti-fascism leagues and an alliance between the French Section of the Workers' International (SFIO), the main socialist party, and the French Communist Party. That resulted in the 1936 Popular Front, which won that year's elections.

== Further consequences ==
The scandal involved a remarkable range of people from politics, wealthy society and the literary-intellectual elite of Paris. Mistinguett was asked why she had been photographed with Stavisky at a nightclub. Georges Simenon reported on the affair and Stavisky's ex-bodyguard threatened him with physical violence. Colette, referring to the alleged inability of any of Stavisky's important friends to remember him, described the dead con artist as "a man with no face".

A trial of twenty people associated with Stavisky began in 1935. Printed charges were 1200 pages long. All of the accused, including Stavisky's widow, two deputies and one general, were acquitted the next year. The amount defrauded was estimated to be the equivalent of $18 million at the prevailing exchange rates, plus an additional $54 million that came within months of being attained. The location of Stavisky's wealth is still unknown.

The Stavisky affair left France weakened internally. The country remained divided politically for the rest of the decade, but the political weaknesses it exposed and exacerbated were not confined to France. The affair was emblematic of a more general decrease of popularity of democratic values and institutions in Europe during the Great Depression.

== In popular culture ==
In 1937, Warner Brothers, released a film based on the Stavisky Affair titled Stolen Holiday. Directed by Michael Curtiz, it featured Claude Rains as Stavisky's fictional counterpart Stefan Orloff, and Kay Francis as his wife. The film asserted unequivocally that Orloff was shot by police and his death was made to look like a suicide.

In Forces occultes, a movie commissioned in 1942 by the Propaganda Abteilung, a delegation of Nazi Germany's propaganda ministry within occupied France, Stavisky was presented as both a Freemason and a crook.

Le dessous des cartes, a 1948 French crime film directed by André Cayatte is loosely based on the Stavisky Affair.

French movie director Alain Resnais told the story in the 1974 movie Stavisky, featuring Jean-Paul Belmondo with the title role and Anny Duperey as his wife Arlette.

The affair also forms part of the background of the events in J. Robert Janes Kaleidoscope, one of the Kohler & St. Cyre mystery novels published in 1993.

== See also ==
- Interwar France
- Straperlo, a 1935 scandal with one of its locations in San Sebastián that scandalized the Second Spanish Republic.
- Nombela scandal, a second 1935 scandal that contributed to the fall of the right-wing coalition government of the Second Spanish Republic.
- Alves dos Reis, who committed banknote fraud in 1924-25 Portugal using forged documents and manipulating financial institutions, contributing to the collapse of the First Portuguese Republic.

== Sources ==
- Alfred Cobban, A History of Modern France, vol. 3: 1871–1962 (1965). Penguin Books. (No ISBN)
- Janet Flanner (Genêt), Paris was Yesterday, (1972), articles from The New Yorker, 1925–1939. ISBN 0-207-95508-5
- Paul Jankowski, Stavisky – A Confidence Man in the Republic of Virtue, (2002) ISBN 0-8014-3959-0
- Large, David Clay, Between Two Fires: Europe's Path in the 1930s (W. W. Norton: 1990) pp. 24–58, a scholarly account
