= Fort de Châtillon =

Fortification near Paris, France

- Part of Fortifications of Paris, Séré de Rivières system
- Fontenay-aux-Roses, France
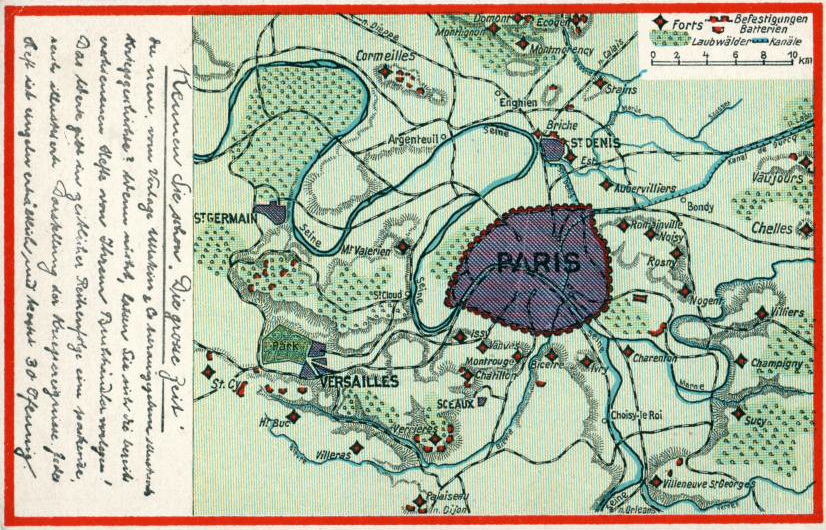
- German post card showing the fortifications of Paris

Site information
- Type: Fort
- Owner: Centre d'Études Nucléaires de Fontenay-aux-Roses
- Controlled by: France
- Condition: Demolished

Location
- Location within Paris and inner ring
- Coordinates: 48.7906°N 2.27611°E

Site history
- Built: 1870
- Materials: Stone, brick
- Demolished: 1957-1977
- Battles/wars: Siege of Paris

Garrison information
- Occupants: CEN-FAR

The Fort de Châtillon was a fortification located about 5 kilometres (3.1 mi) south of Paris in the communes of Châtillon-sous-Bagneux and Fontenay-aux-Roses. It was built in 1874 and was razed beginning in 1957, making way for expansion of the French nuclear research facility at Fontenay-aux-Roses.

The fort was named for the town it was designed to protect, Châtillon-sous-Bagneux, but the greater portion of the site is actually within Fontenay-aux-Roses. The main entry and the portions in Châtillon were destroyed at the end of the Second World War.

== History ==
The site was first fortified during the Franco-Prussian War in 1870, when the redoubt of Châtillon was built by the inhabitants of the town. The works allowed the French to slow the Prussian advance on the capital and was the scene of violent combat. After the war the site was selected for further fortification as part of the Séré de Rivières system ring of fortifications around Paris. Construction on the new pentagonal fort started in 1874, not far from the old redoubt. Unlike other Parisian fortifications, the new fort was designed for action in all directions, as the location commanded much of the surrounding region. The barracks, believed to have been in three levels, were located at the center, surrounded by walls defended by a ditch and caponiers. The fort featured a number of internal traverses, mounded dikes intended as shelters against low-angle shellfire from a variety of directions.

Nearby was the Coupure de Châtillon, a fortified ditch about 150 metres (490 ft) to the northeast of the Fort de Châtillon, defended by artillery batteries. With the Fort de Châtillon, the defenses denied the use of the Châtillon hill to an enemy who might dominate the nearby Forts de Montrouge, Issy and Vanves. The coupure consisted of eighteen traverses covered by artillery and defended by caponiers in the ditch. The entire fortification has vanished with the encroachment of urbanization.

The fort saw no particular action during the Second World War. After the French Liberation, convicted collaborators Joseph Darnand and Jean Hérold-Paquis were executed by firing squad at the fort.

After the war the fort changed vocation to serve the Commissariat à l'énergie atomique, the French atomic energy agency (CEA), and was the site of Zoé, the first French nuclear reactor. The Châtillon site was quickly superseded by a new atomic research facility at Saclay, which opened in 1952.

== Centre d'Études Nucléaires de Fontenay-aux-Roses (CEN-FAR) ==
In 1957 the Fort de Châtillon changed its name to the Centre d'Études Nucléaires de Fontenay-aux-Roses. Only the entry and some buildings of the old fort were saved. The rest was demolished between 1957 and 1970. From 1974 the site housed a tokamak fusion reactor prototype, the TFR. It became difficult to maintain such activities in the densely populated area, and Zoé was shut down in 1977. The site became more oriented to other areas of nuclear research, particularly in the areas of radiation protection and nuclear waste management. The site also accommodates administrative services of the CEA. A 1996 fire in the administration building precipitated a change in use. A portion of the building that housed Zoé became the Museum of the Atom, while the remainder was dedicated to research into the life sciences.

Several buildings on the site remain dedicated to the Autorité de Sûreté Nucléaire (Nuclear Safety Authority) (ASN) and the Institut de Radioprotection et de Sûreté Nucléaire (Institute for Protection and Safety against Nuclear Radiation) (IRSN). The site is no longer spoken of as the "Fort" or "Annex", but as CEN-FAR or IRSN Fontenay-aux-Roses.

== Other Forts de Châtillon ==
Other Forts de Châtillon include one at Châtillon-le-Duc near Besançon, as well as a Fort de Châtillon at Boulogne-sur-Mer.

== See also ==
- Commissariat à l'énergie atomique
- Fortifications of Paris in the 19th and 20th centuries
