= Progressive Republicans (France) =

French centre-right political party (1888–1903)

Progressive Republicans Républicains progressistes
- Leader: Alexandre Ribot; Jules Méline
- Founded: 1888; 138 years ago
- Dissolved: 1903; 123 years ago
- Split from: Moderate Republicans
- Succeeded by: Republican Federation
- Ideology: Liberalism (French); Liberal conservatism Republicanism (French)
- Political position: Centre-right
- Colours: Blue

The Progressive Republicans (French: Républicains progressistes) were a parliamentary group in France active during the late 19th century during the French Third Republic.

The group was formed in 1888 after a split from the Moderate Republicans majority and constituted the parliamentary right-wing after the monarchists' decline towards the end of the 19th century.

== History ==
=== Origins ===
Until the 1880s, the French political landscape consisted of two main groups, namely the left-wing republicans, initially divided into the Republican Left of Jules Grévy and the Republican Union of Léon Gambetta; and the right-wing monarchists, separated into Orléanists, Legitimists and Bonapartists. In 1885, the two republican groups merged to form the Democratic Union to prevent a return of the monarchy. However, the Democratic Union was unable to effectively change the political system, characterised by its instability.

In 1887, the parliamentary opposition (socialists, radicals and monarchists) to the republican majority rallied around the figure of General Georges Ernest Boulanger, former War Minister excluded by the government for his radical nationalism. Facing the threat from the popular Boulanger, the republican group became divided into two opposing factions, namely on one side the old republican guard led by Jules Ferry founded in 1888 the self-declared leftist National Republican Association and on the other side the conservative republicans led by Georges Patinot launched the Liberal Republic Union in 1889.

=== Liberal Republican Union ===
Liberal Republican Union Union libérale républicaine
- Chairman: Henri Barboux
- Founder: Léon Say; Georges Picot
- Founded: March 1889; 137 years ago
- Dissolved: 1 November 1903; 122 years ago
- Split from: Moderate Republicans
- Succeeded by: Republican Federation
- Headquarters: 15, rue de la Ville-l'Évêque, Paris
- Ideology: Anti-Boulangism; Christian democracy Liberal conservatism Republicanism (French)
- Political position: Centre-right
- Colours: Blue
- Politics of France; Political parties; Elections; Staff (1890) 77

The Liberal Union claimed the heritage of Adolphe Thiers' liberalism, but while strong in the Senate it was a minority in the Chamber of Deputies, where it had only eight deputies. However, the Liberal Union was supported by Patinot's Journal des débats. Depicting Boulanger as "a new Napoleon", the party claimed an agreement between moderate republicans and anti-Bonapartist monarchists reminiscent of the 1863 legislative election. The Liberal Union started to depict itself as "liberal and unswervingly conservative", opposing the imposition of an income tax and separation of church and state and after fractures inside the Boulangist movement became the party of farmers, Catholics, bankers, industrialists, lawyers and journalists.

The chair committee of the Liberal Union was headed by Henri Barboux and composed of prominent personalities including Léon Say, Émile de Marcère, Georges Picot and Anatole Leroy-Beaulieu. The party was also financed by the Duke of Aumale, the Orléanist pretender to the throne. Thanks to the downfall of General Boulanger, accused of conspiracy against the Republic, the moderate republicans won the 1889 legislative election by a landslide and the Liberal Union gained six seats in the Chamber of Deputies. The members of the Liberal Union in the Parliament called themselves Progressives, joining the Moderates in the Republican Concentration. However, in the legislative elections of 1893 many Catholics left the Liberal Union for the new Rallies movement characterized by its political Catholicism and allied with the monarchists. Rejecting monarchism, the Liberal Union added the appeal Republican to its name in opposition to the Liberal Union of the Rights of the conservative monarchists.

=== Divisions and dissolution ===
However, the presence of Progressives caused the Republican Concentration to move toward the parliamentary centre. In the late 1890s, the Liberal Republican Union also lost its free market tradition of protectionism, supported by prominent politician Jules Méline. This change led to the departure of Léon Say from the party in 1896. The party remained united until the Dreyfus affair in 1894, when it opposed both radical socialists and rebel nationalists, condemning the rampant antisemitism in public life and supporting in 1898 along with the socialists Prime Minister Pierre Waldeck-Rousseau, a moderate republican.

Two factions developed in the Liberal Republican Union, namely Méline's supporters who were generally anti-Dreyfusard and anti-socialist and Barboux's liberals who supported the government. However, after the fall of Waldeck-Rousseau Cabinet in 1902 the party returned to opposing both socialists and nationalists. With the formation of the first political parties in France in the early 1900s, the Radical-Socialist Party (PRRRS) and the Democratic Republican Alliance (ARD), the Liberal Republican Union tried to create a Progressive Party which would have personified the conservative spirit of the Republic, along with the liberal ARD and the radical PRRRS. Jacques Piou, member of the Rallies, supported the idea of a Tory party in France, born by the fusion of conservative republicans and the Rallies.

Journalist Ernest Daudet also supported this idea and in 1902 many progressives joined the new Liberal Action of Piou. In 1903, the Liberal Republican Union merged with the National Republican Association to form the liberal-conservative Republican Federation led by Auguste Isaac. With the creation of the National Bloc in 1919, Liberal Action merged into the Republican Federation, completing the union of the republican right.

== Prominent members ==
- Auguste d'Arenberg
- Édouard Aynard
- Henri Barboux
- Agénor Bardoux
- Jules Barthélemy-Saint-Hilaire
- René Bérenger
- Raphaël Bischoffsheim
- Jean Casimir-Perier
- Joseph Chailley
- Jules Charles-Roux
- Francis Charmes
- Paul Decauville
- Paul Deschanel
- Ferdinand Dreyfus
- Charles Dupuy
- Félix Faure
- Eugène Goüin
- Charles Jonnart
- Odilon Lannelongue
- Anatole Leroy-Beaulieu
- Pierre Leroy-Beaulieu
- Émile Loubet
- Émile Deshayes de Marcère
- Jules Méline
- Paul Meyer
- Alfred Mézières
- Henri d'Orléans
- Frédéric Passy
- Georges Picot
- Henri Pognon
- Raymond Poincaré
- Alexandre Ribot
- Edmond Rousse
- Léon Say
- Ludovic Trarieux

== Electoral results ==
=== Presidential elections ===
Election year	Candidate	No. of first round votes	% of first round vote	No. of second round votes	% of second round vote	Won/Loss
1894	Jean Casimir-Perier	451	53.37%			Won
1895	Félix Faure	244	31.00%	430	53.75%	Won
1899	Émile Loubet	483	59.48%			Won

=== Legislative elections ===
Chamber of Deputies
Election year	No. of overall votes	% of overall vote	No. of overall seats won	+/–	Leader
1893	3,187,670 (1st)	45.30%	317 / 581	▼37	Charles Dupuy
1898	3,262,725 (1st)	45.30%	254 / 585	▼63	Jules Méline
1902	1,808,736 (2nd)	21.50%	127 / 589	▼127	Alexandre Ribot

== See also ==
- Opportunist Republicans
- Republican Federation
- Sinistrisme
