= 1924 French legislative election =

← 1919	11 May 1924 (first round); 25 May 1924 (second round)	1928 →

All 574 seats in the Chamber of Deputies
- Registered: 11,070,360
- Turnout: 83.03%
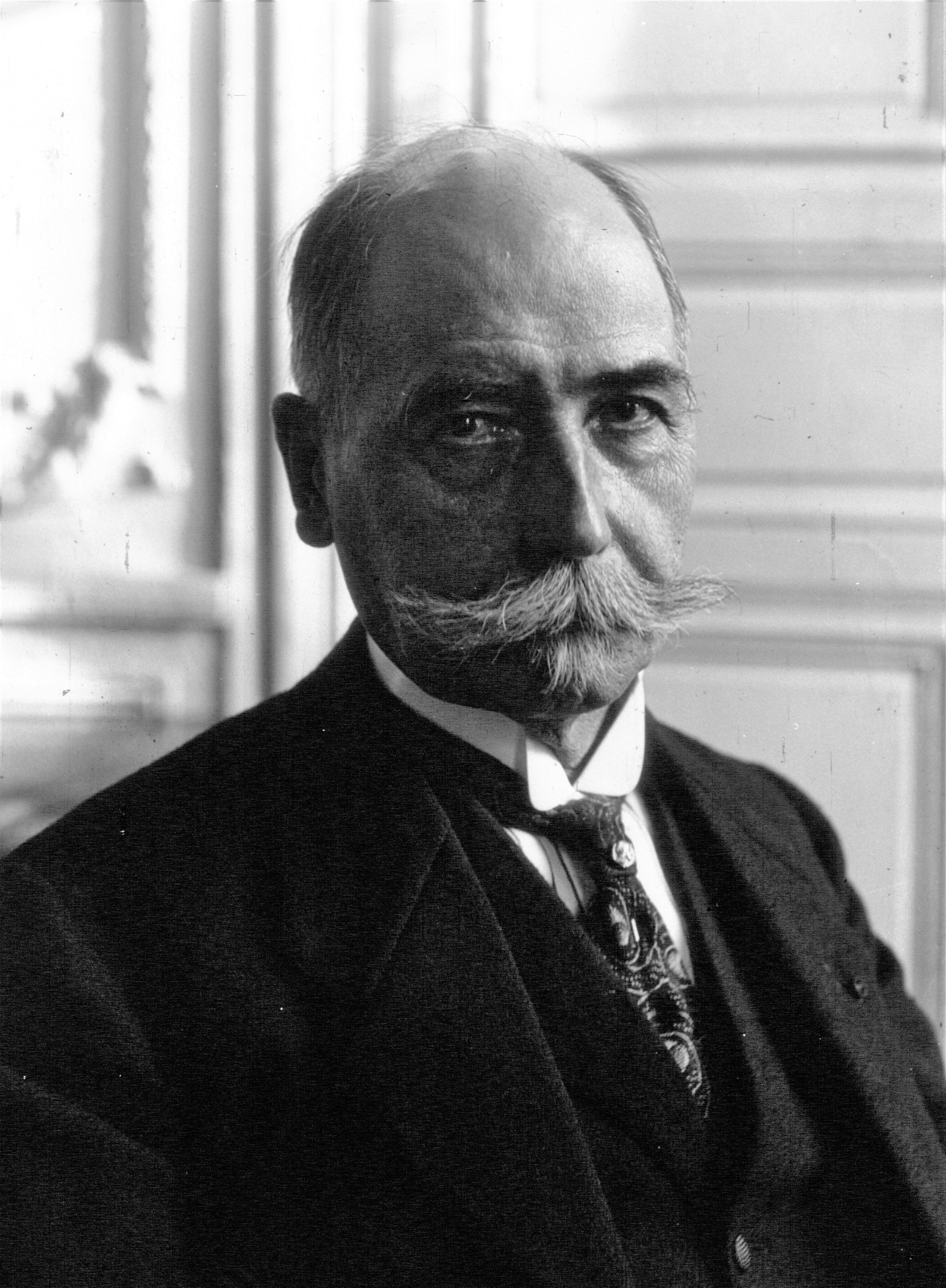

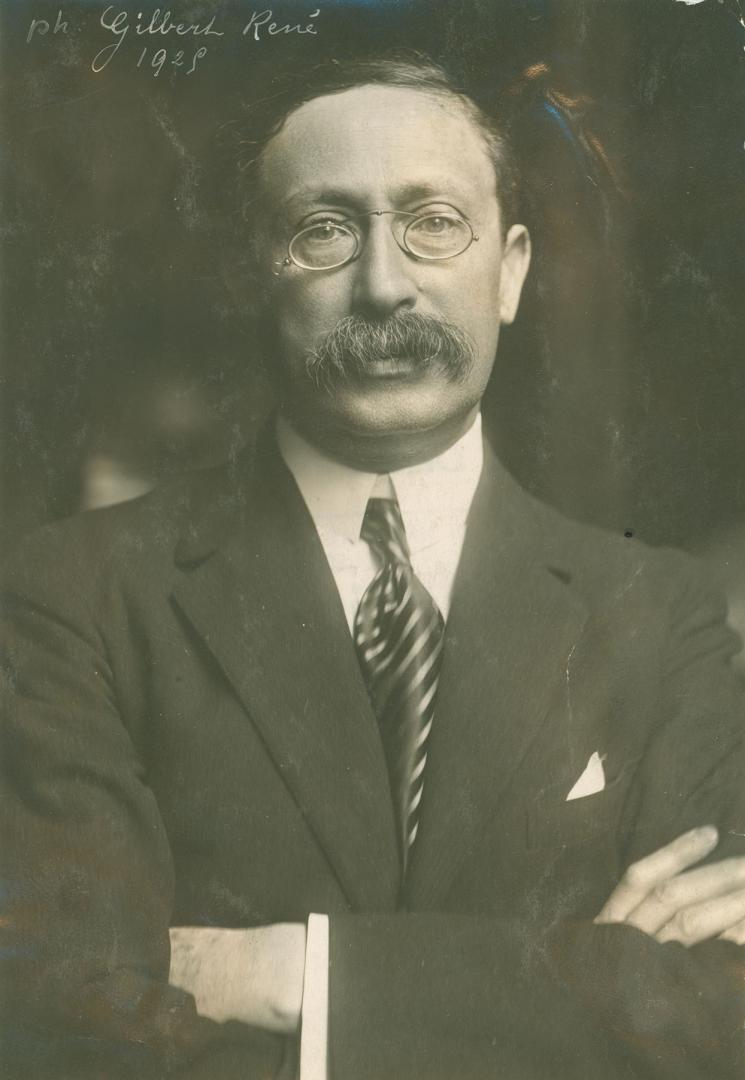

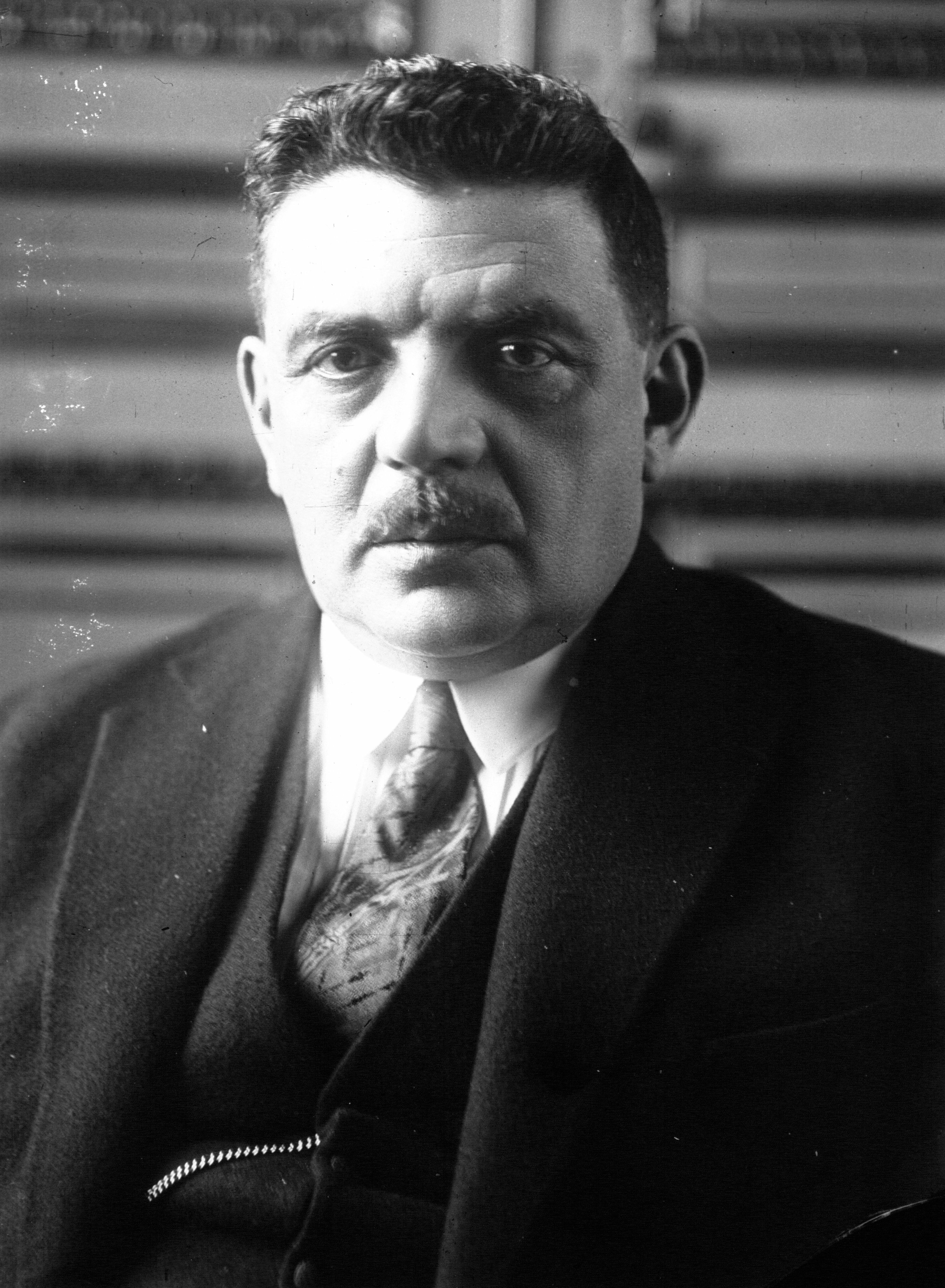
	Majority party	Minority party	Third party
Leader	Auguste Isaac	Léon Blum	Édouard Herriot
Party	URD	SFIO	PRS–PRS
Seats won	204	104	162
Seat change	▲3	▲37	▲39
Popular vote	3,190,831	1,814,000	1,612,581
Percentage	35.35%	20.10%	17.86%
Prime Minister before election
Raymond Poincaré
Democratic Alliance
Elected Prime Minister
Édouard Herriot
Radical-Socialist Party

Legislative elections were held in France on 11 May and 25 May 1924. They resulted in a victory for the left-wing Cartel des Gauches, an alliance of Radicals and Socialists, which governed until July 1926 under the premierships of Édouard Herriot, Paul Painlevé and Aristide Briand.

== Results ==
Party	Votes	%	Seats
Democratic and Republican Union	3,190,831	35.35	204
French Section of the Workers' International	1,814,000	20.10	104
Radical Socialist Party–Republican-Socialist Party	1,612,581	17.86	162
Independent Radicals–Democratic Republican Alliance	1,058,293	11.72	53
French Communist Party	885,993	9.82	26
Conservatives and independents	375,806	4.16	25
Other parties	89,333	0.99	0
Total	9,026,837	100.00	574
Valid votes	9,026,837	98.21	
Invalid/blank votes	164,972	1.79	
Total votes	9,191,809	100.00	
Registered voters/turnout	11,070,360	83.03	
Source: Mackie & Rose, Nohlen & Stöver, France Politique
