= List of major liberal parties considered left =

Liberalism is frequently associated with centrism; however, especially in countries whose Overton window is to the right, or where the mainstream left–right political spectrum includes liberals and conservatives but not socialists and social democrats, liberals may be considered left-leaning or centre-left as opposed to conservatives. Even in countries where socialist political forces exist significantly, some liberal parties have left-leaning characteristics.

== Active ==
=== Major parties ===
Country	Party	Abbr.	Notes	Ref.
Bhutan	People's Democratic Party	PDP	Two-party system enforced by law: the PDP is a liberal party and has been responsible for left-leaning politics.	
Canada	Liberal Party of Canada	LPC	Two-party system dominated by the Liberal and Conservative parties. Most influential third party (NDP) is social democratic.	
India	Indian National Congress	INC	Multi-party system, with two dominant parties that are the most influential: the liberal INC and the conservative BJP.	
Japan	Constitutional Democratic Party of Japan	CDP	Dominant-party system under the conservative LDP. The liberal CDP is one of the main opposition parties, alongside the right-wing populist Ishin and the communist JCP.	
Netherlands	Democrats 66	D66	Multi-party system, with two dominant parties that are the most influential: the liberal D66 and the right-wing populist PVV.	
Slovenia	Freedom Movement	GS	Multi-party system, with two dominant parties that are the most influential: the liberal GS and the conservative SDS.	
South Korea	Democratic Party	DPK	Two-party system dominated by the liberal DPK and the conservative PPP.	
Taiwan	Democratic Progressive Party	DPP	Two-party system dominated by the liberal DPP and the conservative KMT.	
United States	Democratic Party	D	Two-party system dominated by the liberal Democrats and the conservative Republicans.	

While left-leaning liberal parties in Slovenia and South Korea tend to be major parties, they are usually short-lived. Other parties in these traditions include:

- Slovenia: Liberal Democracy of Slovenia, List of Marjan Šarec, Modern Centre Party, Party of Alenka Bratušek, Positive Slovenia, Zares
- South Korea: Democratic United Party, Millennium Democratic Party, Rebuilding Korea Party, Uri Party

=== Other ===
- Belgium: Vivant
- Chile: Liberal Party of Chile, Radical Party of Chile (PRCh)
- Croatia: Istrian Democratic Assembly
- Czech Republic: Czech Pirate Party
- Denmark: Danish Social Liberal Party (B)
- Egypt: Constitution Party
- France: Radical Party of the Left (PRG)
- Gibraltar: Liberal Party of Gibraltar
- Israel: Yesh Atid, The Democrats
- Macau: New Hope, New Macau Association
- Palestine: Third Way
- Philippines: Liberal Party
- Russia: Yabloko
- Singapore: Singapore Democratic Party
- South Korea: Justice Party
- Taiwan: Taiwan People's Party
- United Kingdom: Liberal Democrats, Alliance Party of Northern Ireland

The liberal Progressive Slovakia (PS) is considered right-leaning in that it is the main opposition party to the left-wing nationalist Direction – Social Democracy (Smer). By international standards, PS is referred to as the centre-left. PRCh, B, PRG, and Democrats 66 are connected to classical radicalism, the mainstream left-wing positions before socialism and social democracy mostly replaced it.

== Historical ==
Early liberal parties were mostly related to the political left, therefore only liberal parties that existed since 1945 are included.

- Cyprus: United Democrats
- Hong Kong: Civic Party, Democratic Party, Demosisto
- Israel: Independent Liberals, Shinui
- Italy: Radical Party
- Japan: Democratic Party of Japan, Democratic Party (2016)

== List of liberal political coalitions considered left ==
=== Active ===
- Hong Kong: Pro-democracy camp (majority)
- India: Indian National Developmental Inclusive Alliance
- Iran: Iranian Reformists
- Macau: Pro-democracy camp (majority)

The Civic Coalition (KO), a liberal Polish party, is recognised as centre-right by the international standards. By Polish political standards, it is considered centre-left as the main opposition of the conservative United Right (ZP).

=== Historical ===
- South Korea: Democratic Alliance of Korea (Note: The Democratic Alliance of Korea belongs to the South Korea's liberal bloc. It is sometimes regarded as a "satellite party" of the liberal Democratic Party of Korea.)

== Liberal parties called "Left" ==
Some of these parties are referred to by different names in English, and in this case the native name is used.

=== Active ===
- Denmark: Radikale Venstre, Venstre
- France: Radical Party of the Left
- Norway: Venstre

=== Historical ===
- Austria: United German Left, United Left
- Denmark: Moderate Venstre
- Finland: Svensk Vänster
- France: Centre-Left, Democratic Left, Federation of the Lefts, Independents of the Left, Radical Left, Rally of Republican Lefts, Republican Left, Social and Radical Left, Union of the Lefts
- Hungary: Left Centre, United Left (Civic Freedom Party–National Democratic Party)
- Italy: Historical Left
- Luxembourg: Left Liberals
- Norway: Moderate Venstre, Free-minded Venstre
- Spain: Democratic Left of Catalonia, Republican Left

== See also ==
See also
- Liberalism
  - Social liberalism
- Liberal parties by country
  - Liberalism in Canada
  - Liberalism in China
    - Liberalism in Hong Kong
  - Liberalism in India
  - Liberalism in Iran
  - Liberalism in Japan
  - Liberalism in South Korea
  - Liberalism in the United States
    - Modern liberalism in the United States
- Progressivism
  - Progressivism in Taiwan (Pan-Green Coalition)
- Tangwai movement
- List of Liberal Democratic parties
