= Republican Federation =

Political party in the French Third Republic

Republican Federation Fédération républicaine
- President: Philippe Henriot (last)
- Founder: Jules Méline
- Founded: 1 November 1903; 123 years ago
- Dissolved: 1945; 81 years ago
- Merger of: National Republican Association; Liberal Republican Union
- Succeeded by: Republican Party of Liberty (not legal successor)
- Headquarters: Paris
- Membership (1926): 30,000
- Ideology: Liberal conservatism; Conservatism; Economic liberalism; Social conservatism; Anti-communism; Republicanism
- Political position: Centre-right to right-wing
- National affiliation: National Bloc (1919–1924); Freedom Front (1937–1940)
- Colours: Blue

The Republican Federation (French: Fédération républicaine, FR) was the largest conservative party during the French Third Republic, gathering together the Progressive Republicans and the Orléanists rallied to the Republic.

Founded in November 1903, the party competed with the more secular and centrist Alliance démocratique (Democratic Alliance). Later, most deputies of the Fédération républicaine and of Action libérale (which included Catholics rallied to the Republic) joined the Entente républicaine démocratique right-wing parliamentary group.

== From 1903 to World War I ==
The Republican Federation was founded in November 1903 to gather the right-wing of the Moderate Republicans who opposed both Pierre Waldeck Rousseau's Bloc des gauches (Left-wing Block), his alliance with the Radical-Socialist Party and for some of them the defense of the Jewish officer Alfred Dreyfus. These conservative Republicans were ideologically indebted to Jules Méline, Alexandre Ribot, Jean Casimir-Perier or Charles Dupuy. They represented the Republican bourgeoisie, closely connected to business circles and opposed to social reform. Furthermore, they were fond of a relative decentralisation, thus enrolling themselves in the legacy of the Girondins of the French Revolution. Just as the Democratic Republican Alliance, it was a party composed of notables, which rested upon local electoral committee, which merged in the National Assembly in one or several parliamentary groups. It never had many members (30,000 in 1926 and 18,000 in 1939).

== Interwar period ==
After World War I, the Republican Federation participated during the 1919 legislative election within the Bloc national (National Block)'s electoral lists. The same year, the Action libérale populaire (Popular Liberal Action), an alliance of Catholics who had accepted the legality of the Republican regime, entered the Republican Federation by sitting within parliamentary grouping of the Entente républicaine démocratique (Arago group).

The Republican Federation shifted more and more to the right during the interwar period, and it cannot be simply labelled a Christian-democratic party (a label that is more rightly applied to the very small Popular Democratic Party). Its religious-right and ultranationalist wing were strengthened by the election victory of the centre-left in 1924 and the subsequent rise of the anti-parliamentary and nationalist leagues as well as by a generational shift in its leadership. At the same time, the party's smaller Christian-democratic and social Catholic left-wing received a boost from the arrival of the parliamentary Catholics of the Popular Liberal Action. However, the rift in political ethos was shown by the fact that these preferred to sit in a separate parliamentary grouping from the main party (such as the Popular Democratic group, the Alsatian Popular Action group, or Pernot's Social Action group).

These changes were reflected in the handover of power from the Belle Époque industrialist and conservative leader Auguste Isaac to the younger militant and academic Louis Marin in 1925. Under Marin's leadership, the Republican Federation slowly transitioned from a confederation of local political bosses into a more streamlined political party on the model created by the Republican Left at the turn of the century, becoming more hierarchisesd with the creation of youth sections while ordinary members were given more weight.

Although several members participated to the Doumergue, Flandin and Laval governments of 1934–1935, most of the party opposed itself to this cooperation with the republican centre, which seemed to vindicate the "rallying of the center" (concentration républicaine) strategy advocated by the centre-right Democratic Republican Alliance. Following the experience of the Bloc National first and then of the Cartel des gauches (Left-Wing Cartel) in 1924, many voices inside the party argued in favor of a strategy enforcing the unity of the right-wings instead of a centrist strategy. After the 6 February 1934 riots which toppled the second Cartel des gauches, the majority of the party chose this right-wing strategy, taking the side of the opponents to the Republic accused of being anti-patriotic.

The Republican Federation thus formed in 1937 during the Popular Front a Front de la liberté (Freedom Front) along with Jacques Doriot's fascist Parti populaire français (French Popular Party) and the small Parti républicain national et social and French Agrarian and Peasant Party (Fleurant Agricola). Although this Freedom Front was theorized by Louis Marin and the other leaders of the party as a tactic against the growing influence of Colonel François de La Rocque's French Social Party—one of the first right-wing French mass party—this union also corresponded with the ideology of the leading classes outside Paris (such as Victor Perret in the Rhône region) and of the activists opposed both to the lefts and to the centre-right parties such as the Democratic Alliance or the Popular Democrats.

This shift to the right of the party during the 1930s explain how several important pre-war figures of the party (such as Laurent Bonnevay) left it. The Republican Federation acted as the nexus between parliamentary conservatives and the anti-Republican nationalist right organized in the various far-right paramilitaries and in the ultramonarchist Action française. Party members such as Philippe Henriot or Xavier Vallat (both future collaborationists) thus served as intermediaries between the leaders of the Republican Federation and the extra-parliamentary right.

== After 1940 ==
Although few important members of the Republican Federation actively engaged in collaborationism during the Vichy regime, their conservative allegiance (traditional Catholicism, anti-communism and conservative nationalism) induced most of them to accept the new regime of the Révolution nationale. However, the Republican Federation was part of one of the six member parties of the Conseil national de la Résistance (National Council of Resistance) represented by Jacques Debû-Bridel. Alongside Louis Marin, the latter tried without success to recreate the Republican Federation at the Liberation, but the party remained discredited by the passive attitude of most of its members. After 1949, the National Center of the Independents was the main political structure pursuing the Republican Federation's legacy after the failure of several structures, including the Republican Party of Liberty.

== In Parliament ==
=== In the Chamber of Deputies ===
The Republican Federation deputies sat in the following parliamentary groups in the Chamber of Deputies:

- 1903: Progressive Republicans (Républicain progressiste)
- 1914: The party called its group the Republican Federation (Fédération républicaine) as in 1932 and 1936
- 1919: Democratic Republican Entente (Entente républicain démocratique)
- 1930: Democratic and Republican Union (Union républicaine et démocratique)
- 1932: Republican Federation group
- 1936: Republican Federation and Independent Republicans of Social Action (Républicain indépendant d'action sociale)

Furthermore, the Republican Independents group of Georges Mandel was also close to the Republican Federation.

=== In the Senate ===
The Republican Federation senators sieged in the ANRS group (Action nationale républicaine et sociale, National Republican and Social Action) at least until 1936.

== List of presidents ==
- Eugène Motte (1903–1906)
- Joseph Thierry (1906–1911)
- Charles Prévet (1911–1914)
- Charles Benoist (1914–1919)
- Victor Milliard (1919–1921)
- Auguste Isaac (1921–1925)
- Louis Marin (1925–1946)

== Electoral results ==
Chamber of Deputies
| Election year | No. of overall votes | % of overall vote | No. of overall seats won | +/– | Leader |
| 1906 | 1,864,557 (2nd) | 21.16 | 78 / 585 | – | Auguste Isaac |
| 1910 | 1,565,698 (2nd) | 19.08 | 119 / 595 | ▲41 | Auguste Isaac |
| 1914 | 397,547 (5th) | 4.72 | 37 / 601 | ▼82 | Auguste Isaac |
| 1919 | 1,819,691 (1st) | 22.23 | 183 / 613 | ▲146 | Auguste Isaac |
| 1924 | 3,190,831 (1st) | 35.35 | 102 / 581 | ▼81 | Auguste Isaac |
| 1928 | 2,082,041 (2nd) | 21.99 | 102 / 604 | Steady | Louis Marin |
| 1932 | 1,233,360 (4th) | 12.88 | 59 / 607 | ▼43 | Louis Marin |
| 1936 | 1,666,004 (3rd) | 16.92 | 60 / 610 | ▲1 | Louis Marin |

== Notable members ==
- Édouard Aynard, Lyonnese banker and deputy (1889–1913)
- Maurice Barrès, nationalist writer
- Paul Beauregard
- Charles Benoist (1861–1936)
- Joseph Boissin, deputy of Ardèche
- Jacques Debû-Bridel
- Paul Duquaire, senator and former member of the Popular Liberal Action
- Édouard Frédéric-Dupont
- Alphonse Gourd
- Philippe Henriot, collaborationist under Vichy
- Auguste Isaac, Lyonnesse industrialist, deputy of the Rhône department (1919–1924), Minister of Trade and Industry (1920–1921) and president of the Republican Federation until 1924
- Henri de Kerillis (very close, if not officially a member, of the Republican Federation)
- Louis Loucheur, industrialist
- Louis Marin (1871–1960), deputy of Nancy (1905–1951) and president of the Republican Federation (1925–1940)
- Eugène Motte, industrialist from Roubaix, founder and first president of the Republican Federation
- Georges Pernot
- Victor Perret, president of the Republican Federation of the Rhône, located at the right wing of the party
- Jacques Piou, former president of the Popular Liberal Action who joined the Republican Federation in 1919
- Emmanuel Temple
- Joseph Thierry (1857–1918), lawyer, deputy of the Bouches-du-Rhône (1898–1918), Minister of Public Works (1913), Deputy-State secretary to War (1915–1916), ambassador of France to the King of Spain (1915–1918) and second President of the Republican Federation
- François Valentin (1909–1961), lawyer, deputy (1936–1940), chief of the Légion française des combattants veterans' association under Vichy and then a Resistant
- Pierre Vallette-Viallard, industrialist and deputy of Ardèche (1919–1924; 1928–1940)
- François de Wendel (1874–1949), industrialist from Lorraine, president of the Comité des forges's employers' union, deputy-president of the Union des industries métallurgiques et minières industrial cartel, regent of the Banque de France, deputy, senator and vice president of the Republican Federation in the 1920s
- Xavier Vallat, close to the monarchist Action française in his youth, joined Colonel François de La Rocque's Croix-de-Feu in 1928, head of the General Commission to Jewish Affairs under Vichy and condemned in 1947 for collaborationism
