= 1932 French legislative election =

← 1928	1 and 8 May 1932	1936 →

All 607 seats to the Chamber of Deputies
- Registered: 11,740,893
- Turnout: 9,576,422 (81.6%)
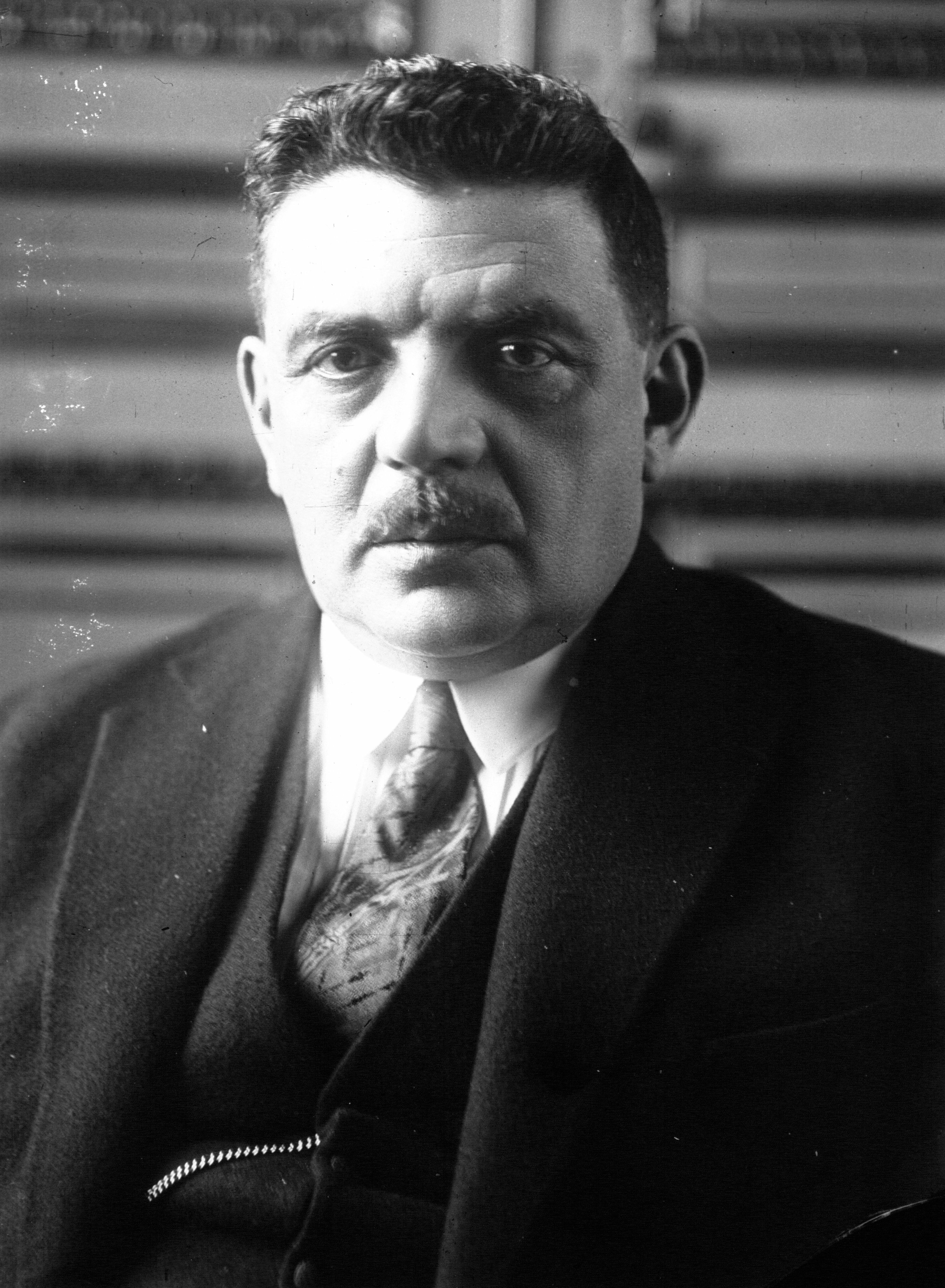

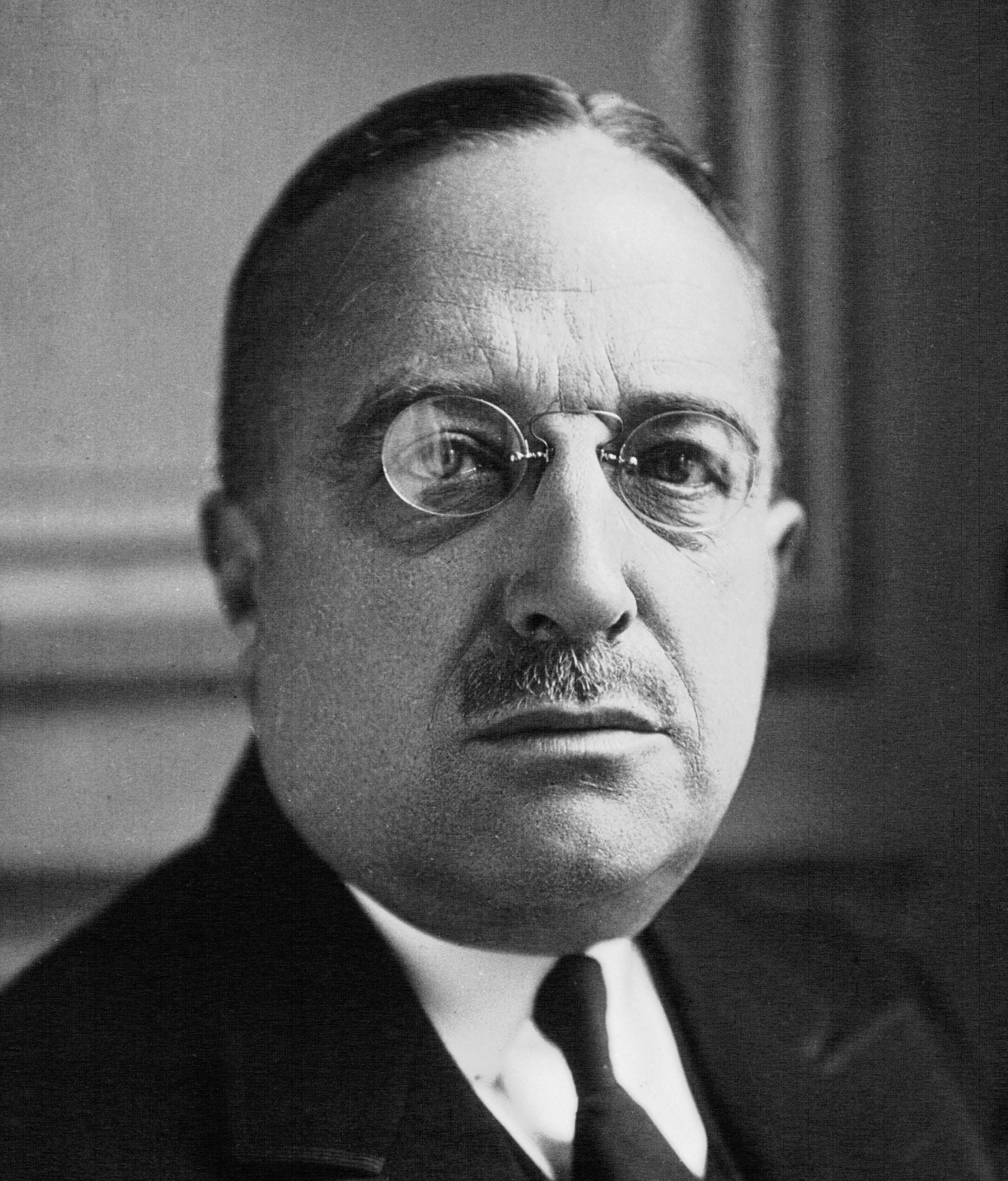

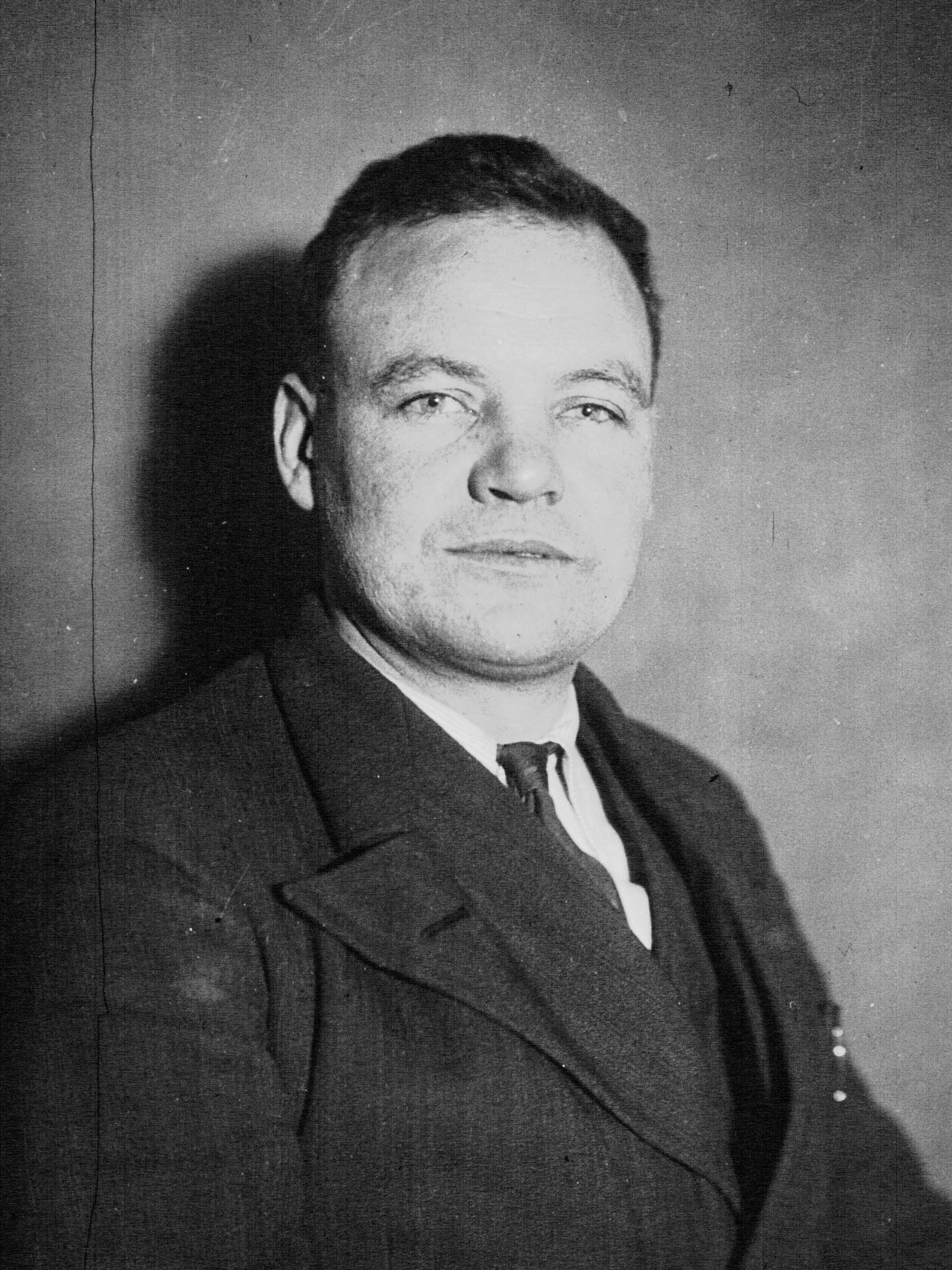
	Majority party	Minority party	Third party
Leader	Édouard Herriot	André Tardieu	Maurice Thorez
Party	PRRRS	Democratic Alliance	PCF
Alliance	Lefts Cartel	Right-wing coalition
Leader's seat	Rhône	Territoire de Belfort	Seine
Seats won	320	268	10
Seat change	▲33	new party	▼1
Popular vote	4,394,963	4,380,717	796,630
Percentage	45.89%	45.7%	8.32%
Swing	▲7.82%		▼2.94%
Prime Minister before election
André Tardieu
Democratic Alliance
Elected Prime Minister
Édouard Herriot
Radical-Socialist Party

Legislative elections were held in France on 1 and 8 May 1932 to elect the 15th legislature of the French Third Republic.

The elections saw the victory of the second Cartel des gauches, but the socialists and Radicals could not form a coalition government. Édouard Herriot instead formed a government with the support of the centre-right and Radicals held the premiership until the 6 February 1934 crisis.

== Results ==
Party	Votes	%	Seats
French Section of the Workers' International	1,964,384	20.51	129
Radical Socialist Party	1,836,991	19.18	157
Democratic Republican Alliance	1,299,936	13.57	72
Republican Union	1,233,360	12.88	76
Independent Radicals	955,990	9.98	62
French Communist Party	796,630	8.32	12
Conservatives and independents	582,095	6.08	33
Republican-Socialist Party	515,176	5.38	37
Popular Democratic Party	309,336	3.23	16
Proletarian Unity Party	78,412	0.82	11
Other parties	4,112	0.04	0
Total	9,576,422	100.00	605
Valid votes	9,576,422	99.21	
Invalid/blank votes	75,772	0.79	
Total votes	9,652,194	100.00	
Registered voters/turnout	11,561,751	83.48	
Source: Mackie & Rose, Nohlen & Stöver, France Politique
