= 1906 French legislative election =

- 6 and 20 May 1906

All 585 seats in the Chamber of Deputies 293 seats needed for a majority
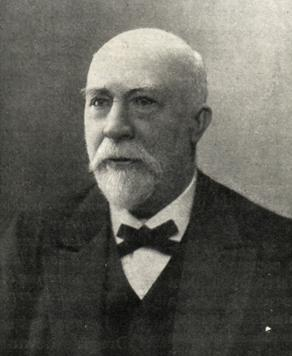

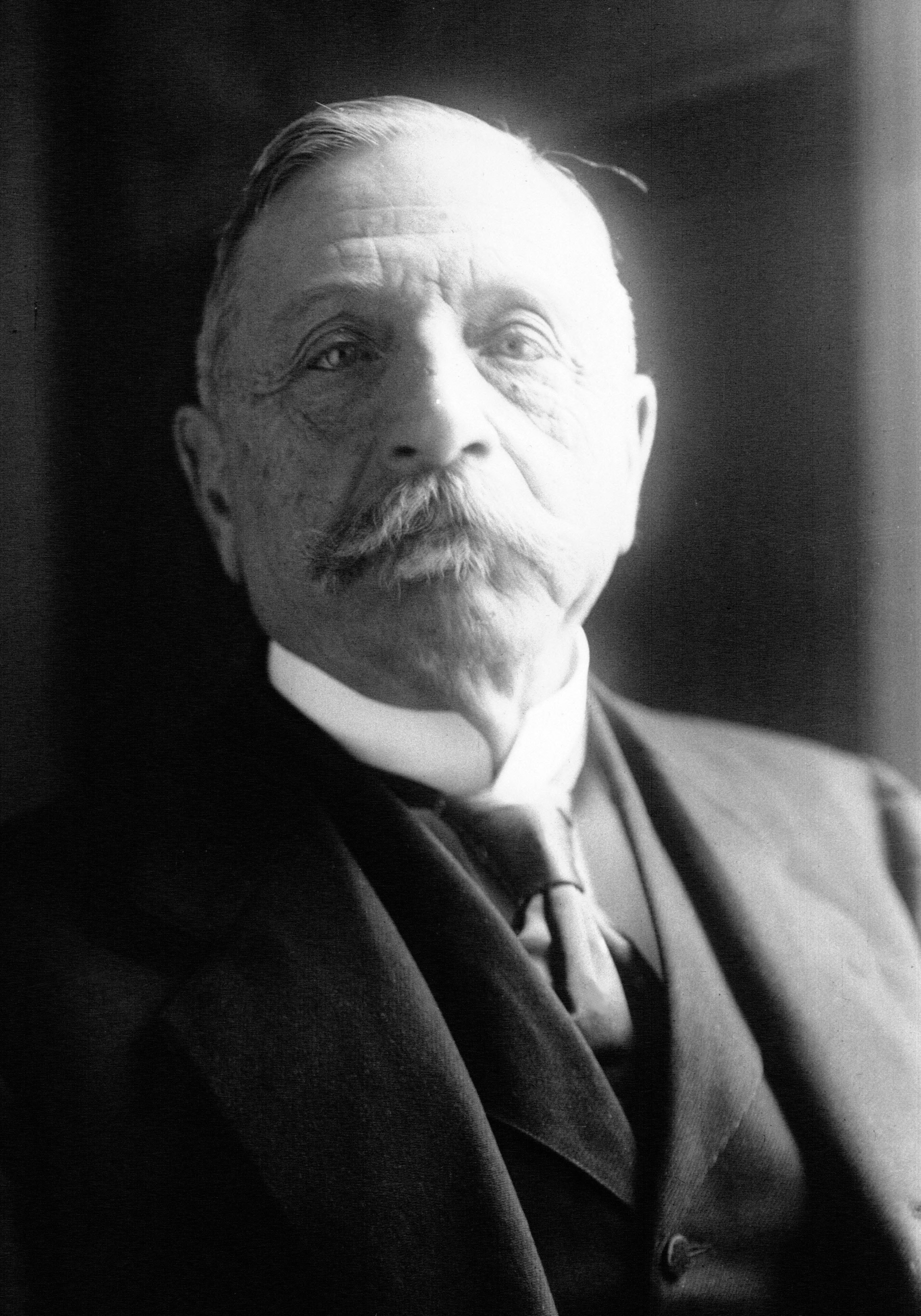

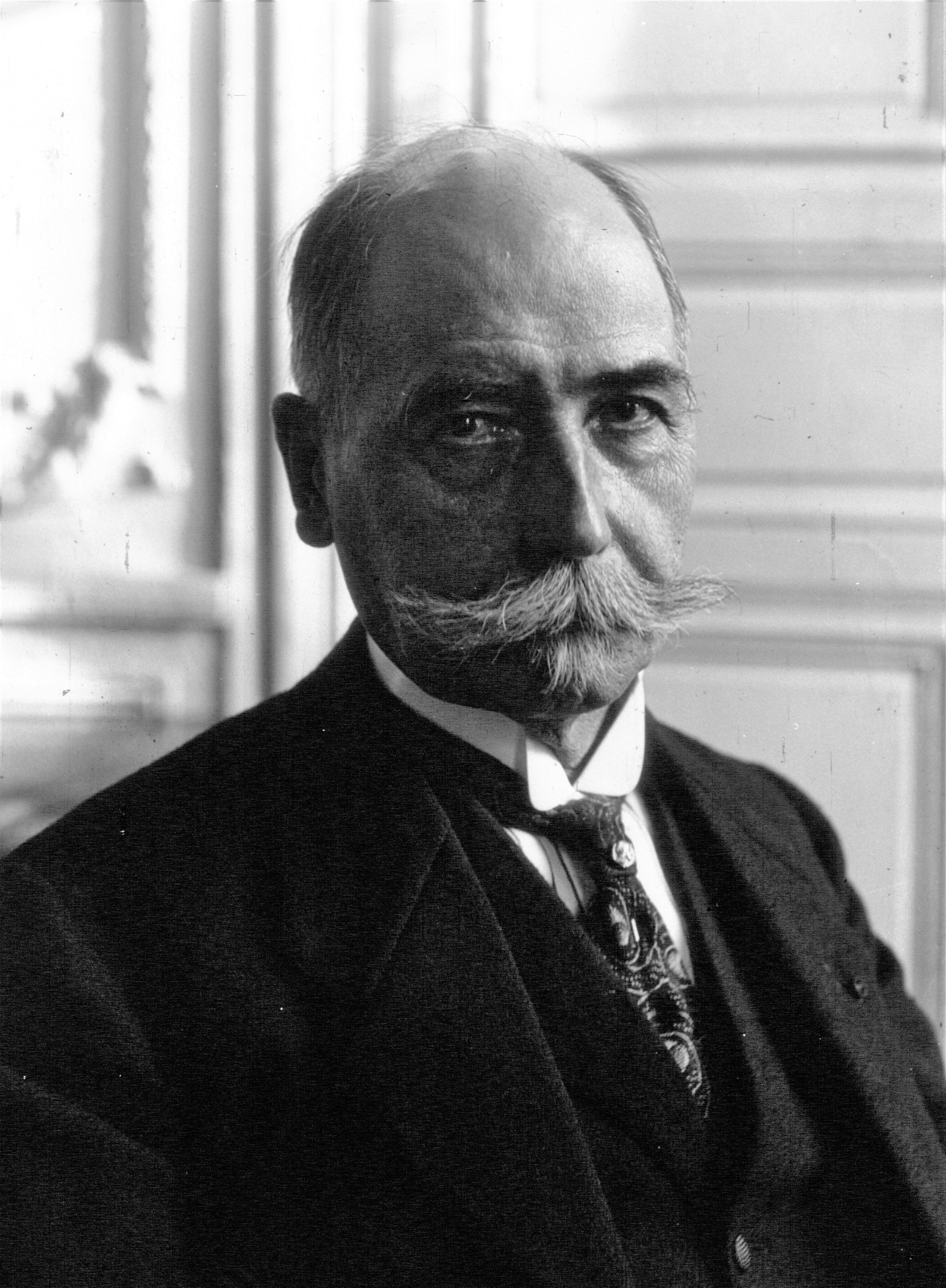
Leader	Ferdinand Sarrien	Jacques Piou	Auguste Isaac
Alliance	Left Bloc Parties: PRRRS; ARD; Independent Radicals; Independent Socialists	Conservatives Parties: Liberal Action; Nationalists; Reactionaries	Republican Federation (Note: By 1906, the Progressive Republicans and conservative Moderate Republicans had reconciled into a single political party, called the Republican Federation, though candidates elected from the party sat in the Chamber of Deputies as Progressive Republicans until 1914.)
Seats won	357	108	66
Seat change	▲19	▼16	▼61
Popular vote	4,115,530	2,571,765	1,238,048
Percentage	46.70%	29.18%	14.05%
Prime Minister before election
Ferdinand Sarrien
Radical-Socialist Party
Elected Prime Minister
Ferdinand Sarrien
Radical-Socialist Party

Legislative elections were held in France on 6 and 20 May 1906. The elections produced an increased majority for the governing coalition between the Radicals (PRRRS) and the left Republicans (ARD), which had held power under the premierships of Maurice Rouvier and Ferdinand Sarrien since January 1905.

Sarrien resigned on 20 October for reasons of health. Georges Clemenceau, also a Radical, replaced him, and remained premier until July 1909, after which he went on to become one of the longest-serving French Prime Ministers. The Bloc des gauches formally dissolved with Clemenceau's coming to power.

== Electoral system ==
By the law of 13 February 1889, French legislative elections would take place utilising a first past the post system to elect one deputy in each constituency to the Chamber of Deputies, with some arrondissements being divided into multiple constituencies, though most containing only one.

== Results ==
Party	Votes	%	Seats
Conservatives (incl. ALP)	2,571,765	29.18	78
Nationalist Party	2,571,765	29.18	30
Radical-Socialist Party	2,514,508	28.53	132
Republican Federation	1,238,048	14.05	66
French Section of the Workers' International	877,221	9.95	54
Democratic Republican Alliance	703,912	7.99	90
Independent Radicals	692,029	7.85	115
Independent Socialists	205,081	2.33	20
Others	9,924	0.11	0
Total	8,812,488	100.00	585
Registered voters/turnout	11,341,062	–	
Source: Rois et Presidents,
