= Independents of the Left =

The Independents of the Left (French: Indépendants de gauche, IG) was a French parliamentary technical group in the Chamber of Deputies of France during the French Third Republic.

The group was formed by centre-right independents and members of political parties too small to form their own parliamentary party. It was roughly situated to the right of the Radical Left party (conservative Radicals) and the left of the Republicans of the Left party (conservative Liberals), and its members' political opinions tended to overlap with these two parties.

It was considered an affiliate of the Democratic Republican Alliance.

The group was presided, among others, by René Besse. It contained 26 deputies in the legislature of 1932-6, and 12 in the legislature of 1936-40.

== See also ==
- Liberalism and radicalism in France
- Sinistrisme
