= Popular Democratic Party (France) =

Christian democratic party in France (1924-1940)

Popular Democratic Party Parti démocrate populaire
- Abbreviation: PDP
- President: Auguste Champetier de Ribes (1929–1940)
- Founded: 1924
- Dissolved: 1940
- Succeeded by: Popular Republican Movement(not legal successor)
- Ideology: Christian democracy
- Political position: Centre to centre-right
- Religion: Catholicism
- International affiliation: White International

The Popular Democratic Party (French: Parti démocrate populaire, PDP) was a Christian democratic political party in France during the Third Republic. Founded in 1924, it represented the trend of French social Catholicism, while remaining a party embodying the ideology of centrism. The party's ideology was inspired by the popularism of Luigi Sturzo's Italian People's Party. The PDP was a co-founder in 1925 of the International Secretariat of Democratic Parties of Christian Inspiration (SIPDIC).

The PDP had its roots in French Catholicism and various Christian movements inspired by Hugues Felicité Robert de Lamennais and later continued by Marc Sangnier's Le Sillon, the Young Republic League and the Popular Liberal Action (ALP), the party of republican Catholics founded in 1902 and dissolved in 1919.

== History ==
=== Foundation ===
The creation of the PDP has its premises in the context of the immediate post-war, the reintegration of Catholics in the nation by the wartime Union sacrée and the involvement of Catholics in power during the National Bloc (1919–1924).

From the National Bloc, fourteen deputies founded the core of the PDP prior to the 1924 legislative election.

Established by Congress on 15 and 16 November 1924, under the chairmanship of George Thibout and involving 200 delegates, the PDP supported the desire to achieve "a task in bringing reconciliation around the idea of Republicanism" by the definition of "new Republican faith" The Popular Democrats advocated that religion was not and should not be a line between right and left. However, the PDP oriented itself to the centre-right in direct competition to the Republican Federation, the party from which most of the PDP's members came from and where social Catholics concentrated since the demise of the ALP.

=== 1932 – 1940 ===
Faced to the governing left-wing Cartel des Gauches, the PDP ranked itself in the parliamentary opposition but stayed outside of the National Catholic Federation (FNC), founded by General Édouard de Castelnau as a reaction to the anti-clerical legislation passed by Édouard Herriot's cabinet. The PDP supported the ministries of Raymond Poincaré, satisfied by his stabilization of the economic situation, but hostile to the lack of social legislation. In addition, the PDP developed the popular theme of "party of the centre" or "Cartel of the Centres", which explained their support for the Ministry led André Tardieu (November 1929-February 1930).

Despite its position, the PDP had little weight in the different governments formed between 1926 and 1932. Only Auguste Champetier de Ribes participated in various governments between 1928 and 1930.

However, the PDP acquired increasing visibility both on the ground locally and by increasing its number of elected officials at all levels (local, departmental and national). Faced with the growing threat from the Popular Democrats, the Republican Federation virulently opposed the PDP via the popular voice of Henry Kérillis who alleged that the PDP divided the "national right". Only Georges Pernot advocated collaboration between his party (the Federation) and the PDP.

The PDP was moved to the right by the Stavisky Affair and during the 6 February 1934 crisis where the party supported the parliamentary right's arguments. In its later years, the PDP divided into broad left-wing and right-wing factions.

=== World War II and post-war ===
If the majority of the parliamentary party voted full powers to Marshal Philippe Pétain on 10 July 1940, the PDP, however, provided the largest contingent of opponents against full powers within the right (Pierre de Chambrun, Auguste Champetier de Ribes, Paul Simon). While a number of Popular Democrats collaborated with the Vichy Regime, others, such as Georges Bidault joined the resistance. Following the war, a large majority of Popular Democrats joined the Christian democratic Popular Republican Movement, which had its roots in the resistance movement. Some members also joined the Rally of Republican Lefts.

== Ideology ==
The PDP was attached to the Republic and to political liberties. In this sense, the PDP adhered to the Christian democratic idea that one can be Republican and Catholic. However, the PDP opposed French laïcité and defended the liberty of confessional education. The PDP opposed both economic liberalism and socialism, and aimed to achieve democracy in the economic and social organization by the gradual reform and collaboration between the various elements of production (mixed by unions and employee representatives in particular). Advocating state intervention in the economy, the PDP wanted to achieve social justice through the application of a Catholic social program (8-hour work day, paid leave, social insurance, family allowances). On the institutional level, the PDP, which has been described as conservative, advocated administrative, social and economic decentralization. The party also supported a more powerful executive, while upholding the legislative power by imposing rules that allow for government stability. The PDP supported proportional representation, women's suffrage and the family vote (the head of the family would have a number of votes proportional to the size of his family (wives and children) in addition to his own in elections). In foreign policy, the PDP supported the League of Nations. It supported the Franco-German rapprochement after World War I.

== Leadership ==
=== Presidents ===
- Georges Thibout (1924–1929).
- Auguste Champetier de Ribes (1929–1940) Lawyer, deputy and later Senator for the Basses-Pyrénées (1924–1942)

=== General Secretary ===
- Jean Raymond-Laurent (1924–1940). Former member of Le Sillon, deputy for the Loire (1938–1942)

== Literature ==
- Delbreil, Jean-Claude (2004). "Christian Democracy and Centrism: The Popular Democratic Party in France". In Kaiser, Wolfram; Wohnout, Helmut (eds.). Political Catholicism in Europe 1918-45. Routledge. pp. 95–110. ISBN 0-7146-5650-X.
