= Cartel des Gauches =

Cartel of the Left Cartel des Gauches
- President: Édouard Daladier (last)
- Founder: Édouard Herriot
- Founded: 1924
- Dissolved: 1934
- Preceded by: Lefts Bloc
- Succeeded by: Popular Front
- Headquarters: Paris
- Ideology: Radicalism; Socialism; Anti-clericalism; Factions: Democratic socialism Social democracy Liberal socialism Social liberalism
- Political position: Centre-left to left-wing
- Colours: Light pink

The Cartel of the Left (French: Cartel des gauches [kaʁtɛl de ɡoʃ]) was the name of the governmental alliance between the Radical-Socialist Party, the socialist French Section of the Workers' International (SFIO), and other smaller left-republican parties that formed on two occasions in 1924 to 1926 and in 1932 to 1933. The Cartel des gauches twice won general elections, in 1924 and in 1932. The first Cartel was led by Radical-Socialist Édouard Herriot, but the second was weakened by parliamentary instability and was without one clear leader. Following the 6 February 1934 crisis, President of the Council Édouard Daladier had to resign, and a new Union Nationale coalition, led by the right-wing Radical Gaston Doumergue, took power.

== History ==
=== The first Cartel (1924–1926) ===
The Cartel des gauches, formed primarily between the Radical-Socialist Party and the SFIO, was created in 1923 as a counterweight to the conservative alliance (Bloc National), which had won the 1919 elections with 70% of the seats (the "Blue Horizon Chamber"). Formed by the conservative Radicals, the conservative-liberal Alliance Démocratique, the conservative-Catholic Fédération Républicaine, Action Liberale (issued from the right-wing members who had "rallied" themselves to the Republic), and far-right nationalists, the Bloc National had played on the red scare following the 1917 October Revolution to win the elections.

The left-wing coalition included four different groups: the independent radicals (a group slightly to the right of the Radical-Socialists); the Radical-Socialists, the Socialist Republicans (slightly to the Radical-Socialists' left) and the SFIO. The Cartel organized a network of committees in the entire country, and started publishing a daily newspaper (Le Quotidien) and a weekly, Le Progrès Civique.

Due to the division of the right-wing, the Cartel won the elections on 11 May 1924, after the French government's failure to collect German reparations even after occupying the Ruhr. The left-wing obtained 48.3% of the votes, and the right-wing 51.7%, but the Cartel gained the majority of seats thanks to a favorable voting system, with 327 against 254 (the right-wing and the first communist deputies). The new majority was led by Édouard Herriot, and broke up in 1926, with the SFIO passing into the opposition. Despite this majority in parliament, the Cartel didn't enjoy the backing of a majority of the electorate, even when including communist voters, whose party had elected to oppose the government, with the Cartel needing to rely on the shaky support of center-left deputies for its continued survival.

In parliament, a draft law on amnesty submitted in June 1924 was adopted at the cost of six months of a harsh parliamentary battle, whereas legislation aimed at expanding secularism generated virulent opposition and demonstrations soon captured by catholic and right-dominated associations. Capital flight and the failure to retrieve the reparations created a monetary crisis, which led to the creation of a new government by the centre-right Raymond Poincaré. As soon as Poincaré formed his new government, composed of the National Bloc parties plus the Radical-Socialists, the monetary crisis ended.

=== The second Cartel (1932–1934) ===
The right-wing then won the 1928 legislative elections, with 329 right-wing deputies against 258 for the left. As in previous elections, the Radical-Socialists presented themselves with the left.

In 1932 the second Cartel won a majority of seats, but its parties had not agreed upon forming a coalition for government. The socialists asked for specific conditions in exchange for their participation in the government (known as "Huygens conditions"). Several governments fell in quick succession, each led by figures of the republican centre-left This parliamentary majority, distinct from the electoral majority, was weak. This parliamentary instability, coupled with the Stavisky Affair, provided a pretext for the 6 February 1934 riots organized by far right leagues. The following day, the Radical-Socialist president of the Council Édouard Daladier was forced to resign due to pressure by the rioters. It was the first time during the Third Republic (1871–1940) that a government fell because of demonstrations, and the left-wing became convinced that its fall was assisted by a fascist conspiracy to overthrow the Republic. This prompted the creation of left-wing anti-fascist coalitions including the Comité de vigilance des intellectuels antifascistes and other similar groups. This broad left-wing coalition eventually led to the formation of the Popular Front, which won the elections in 1936, bringing to power Léon Blum.

== Composition ==
Party	Main ideology	Leader/s
Radical-Socialist Party	Radicalism	Édouard Herriot (last)
French Section of the Workers' International	Democratic socialism	Paul Faure
Republican-Socialist Party	Social democracy	René Viviani
Independent Radicals	Social liberalism	Raoul Péret

== See also ==
- Interwar France
- History of France (1900–present)
- Radical-Socialist Party (France)
- French Section of the Workers' International (SFIO)
- French Left
