= Alphonse Gourd =

French politician

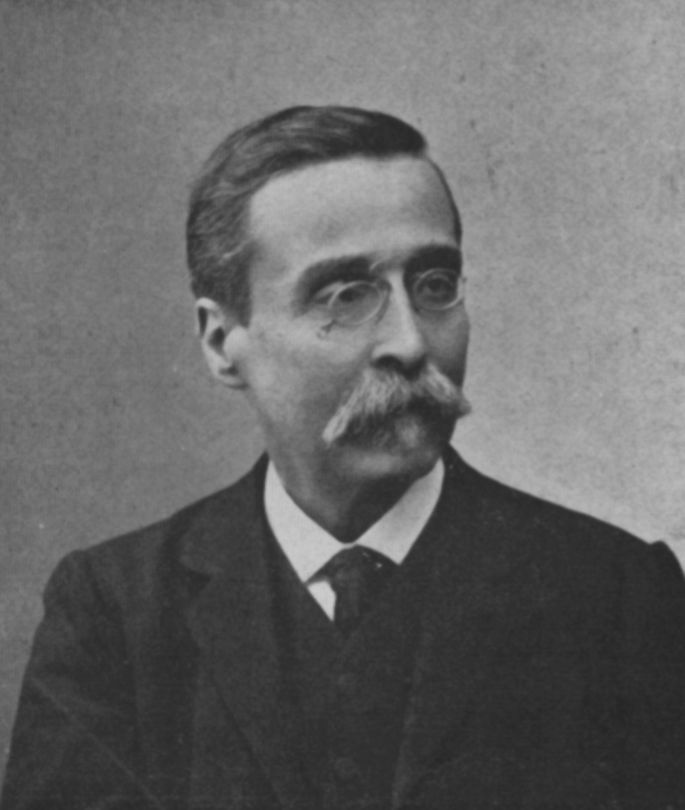
Portrait of Alphonse Gourd

Alphonse Gourd (7 September 1850 - 23 December 1925) was a French politician belonging to the Republican Federation.

Gourd was born in New York City. He was a member of the Chamber of Deputies from 1898 to 1924.
