= Édouard Aynard =

French politician (1837–1913)

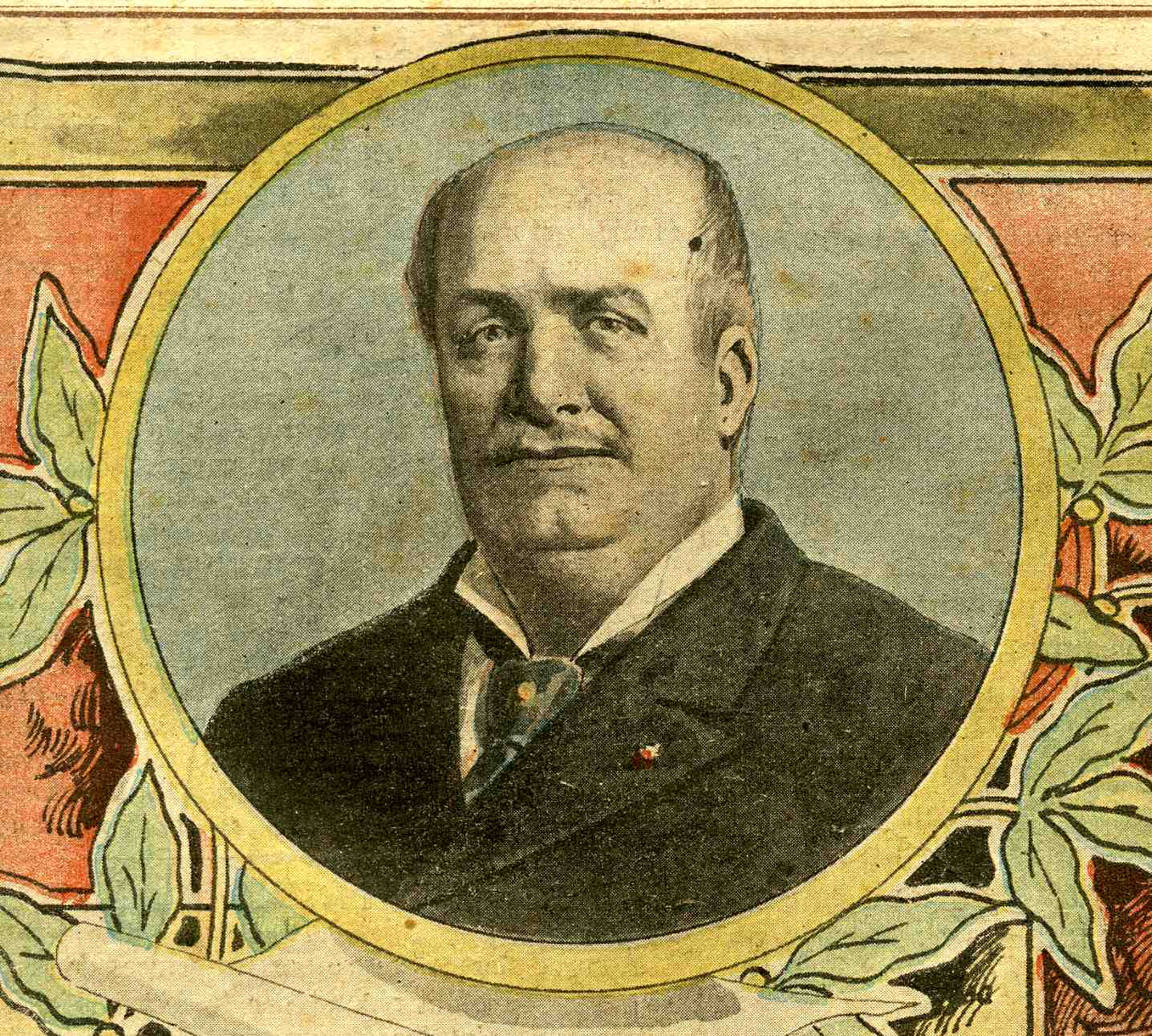
Illustration from Le Pèlerin, 2 March 1902

Édouard Aynard (1 January 1837, Lyon – 25 January 1913) was a French politician belonging to the Republican Federation. He was a member of the Chamber of Deputies from 1889 to 1913.
