= Federation of the Lefts =

The Federation of the Lefts (French: Fédération des gauches) was a French electoral coalition during the French Third Republic. It was founded in January 1914, by members of the Democratic Republican Alliance such as Aristide Briand, Alexandre Millerand and Louis Barthou to provide a centrist alternative to the left's coalition, led by the Radical-Socialist Joseph Caillaux. However, the federation failed to attract the most moderate radical voters and the left won the 1914 election which saw the centre fall back. The federation was a failure.

However, a parliamentary group under the name Republican, Radical and Radical-Socialist Union (Union républicaine radicale et radicale-socialiste) was formed in the new legislature and held a relatively important position in the legislature.

== See also ==
- Democratic Republican Alliance
- Sinistrisme
