= 1928 French legislative election =

- 22 and 29 April 1928

All 604 seats in the Chamber of Deputies
- Registered: 11,395,760
- Turnout: 9,548,081 (83.79%)
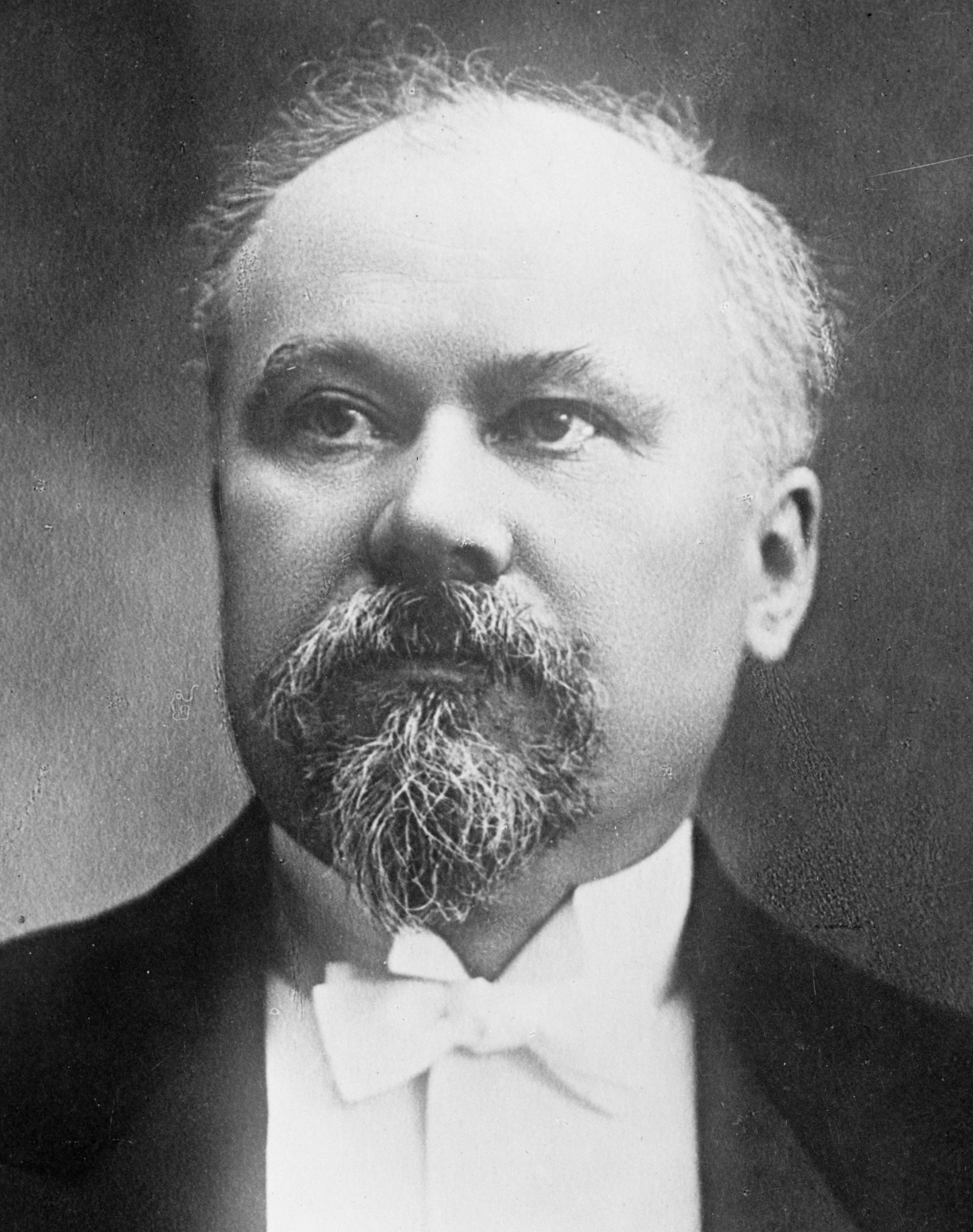

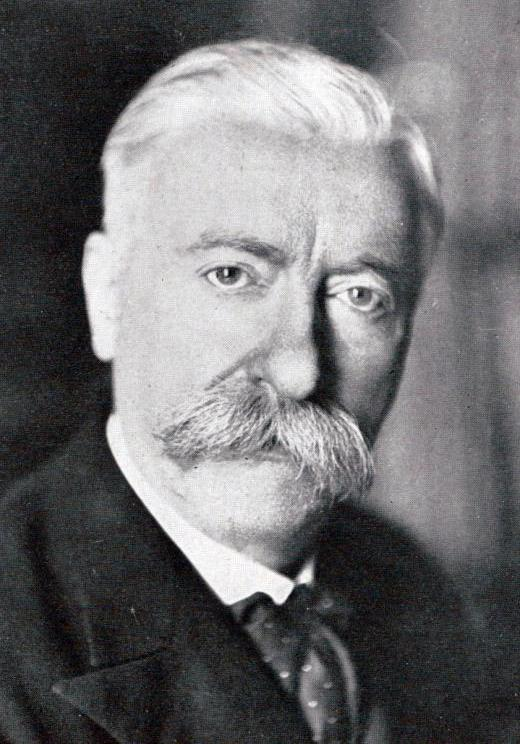

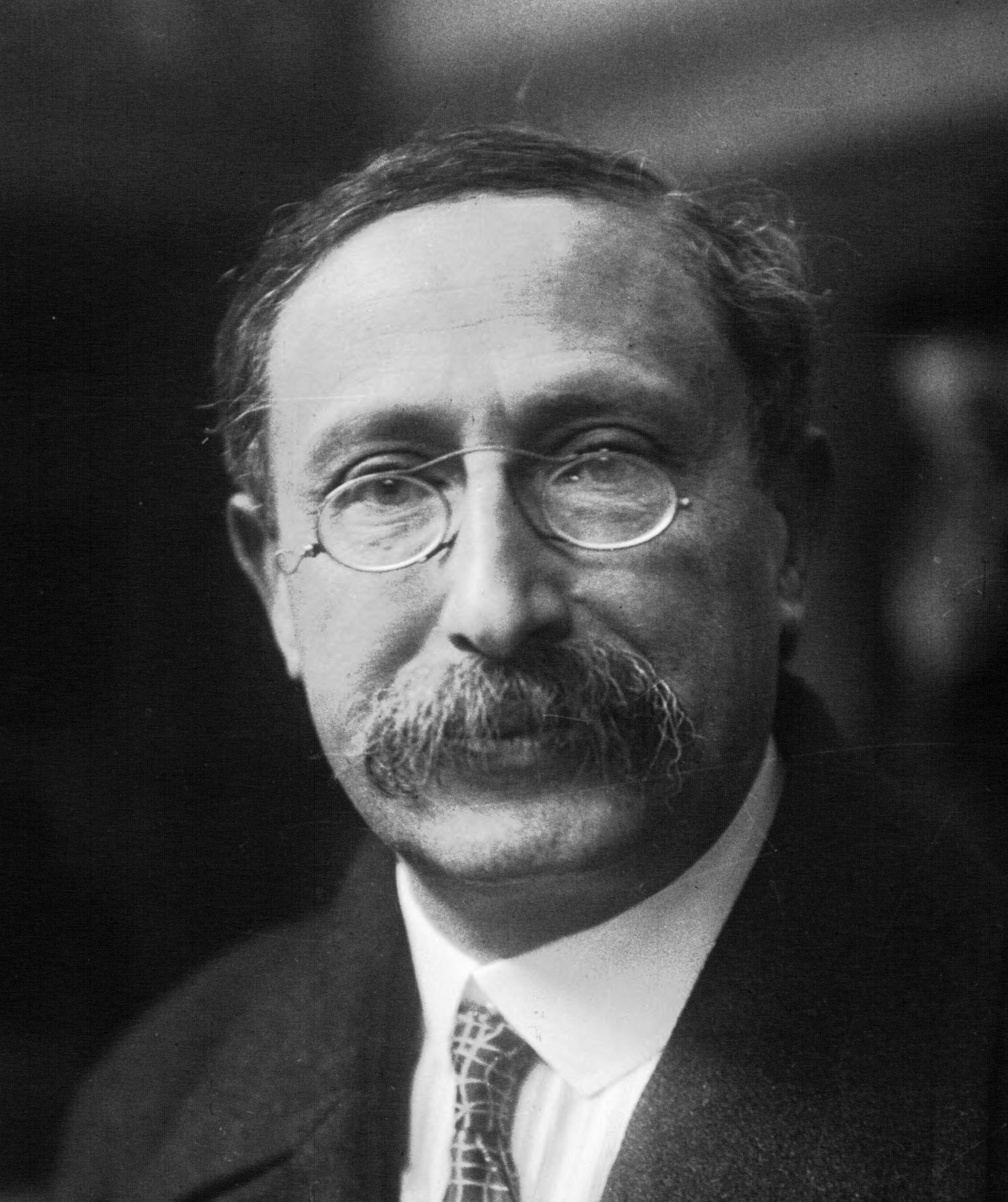

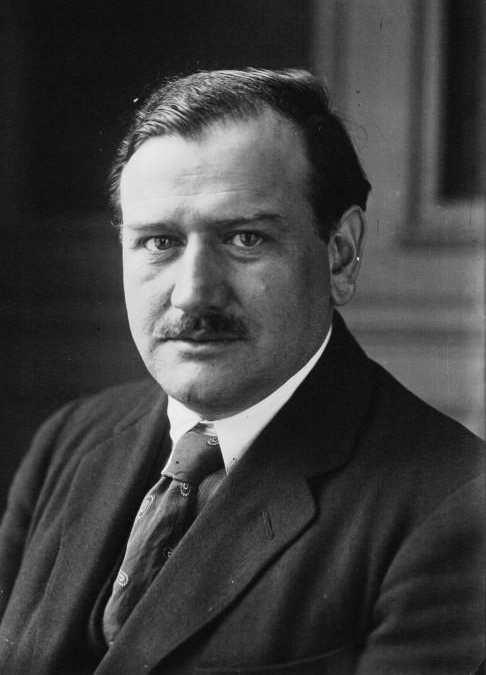
	Majority party	Minority party
Leader	Raymond Poincaré	Louis Marin
Party	AD	FR
Leader's seat	Meuse	Meurthe-et-Moselle
Seats won	126	182
Seat change	▲73	▼22
Popular vote	2,196,243	2,082,041
Percentage	23.19%	21.99%
Swing	▲11.47pp	▼13.36pp
	Third party	Fourth party
Leader	Léon Blum	Édouard Daladier
Party	SFIO	PRV
Leader's seat	Aude	Vaucluse
Seats won	99	120
Seat change	▼5	▼19
Popular vote	1,708,972	1,682,543
Percentage	18.05	17.77%
Swing	▼2.05pp	▼0.09pp
Prime Minister before election
Raymond Poincaré
Democratic Alliance
Elected Prime Minister
Raymond Poincaré
Democratic Alliance

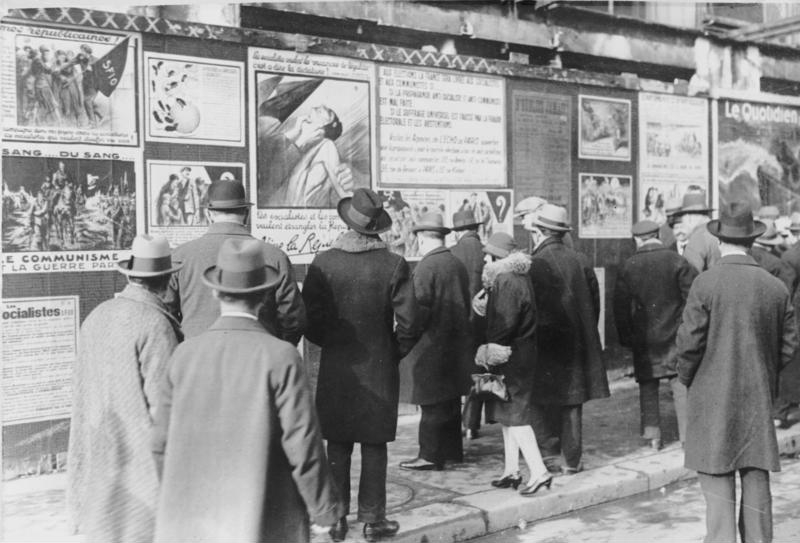
Campaign posters in the streets of Paris, 1928.

Legislative elections were held in France on 22 and 29 April 1928. These elections saw the restoration of the two-round system that had been abolished in 1919.

The result was a victory for the centre-right government of Raymond Poincaré, which had been in power since July 1926. A succession of centre-right governments followed until 1932.

== Results ==
Party	Votes	%	Seats
Democratic Alliance	2,196,243	23.19	74
Independent Radicals	2,196,243	23.19	52
Democratic and Republican Union	2,082,041	21.99	182
French Section of the Workers' International	1,708,972	18.05	99
Radical Socialist Party	1,682,543	17.77	120
French Communist Party	1,066,099	11.26	14
Republican-Socialist Party	432,045	4.56	30
Conservatives and independents	215,169	2.27	26
Independent Socialists	58,279	0.62	3
Miscellaneous left	24,122	0.25	2
Other parties	4,348	0.05	2
Total	9,469,861	100.00	602
Valid votes	9,469,861	99.18	
Invalid/blank votes	78,220	0.82	
Total votes	9,548,081	100.00	
Registered voters/turnout	11,395,760	83.79	
Source: Mackie & Rose, Nohlen & Stöver, France Politique
