= National Bloc (France) =

National Bloc Bloc national
- Leaders: Georges Clemenceau, Paul Deschanel, Alexandre Millerand
- Founded: 1919
- Dissolved: 1924
- Headquarters: Paris
- Political position: Centre-right
- Colours: Blue

The National Bloc (French: Bloc national) was the name given to two loose coalitions formed by various parties of the right in France, characterised by an alliance between former enemies as Independent Radicals, Conservative Liberals and Catholic nationalists. The first Bloc, led by Clemenceau, was in power from 1919 to 1924. Later, the name was often used to describe a governing alliance of a similar range of parties, led by Poincaré and in power from 1926 to 1932.

== Elections of 1919 ==
Made up primarily of conservative right wing parties, such as the Fédération républicaine, Alliance démocratique, and Action libérale, the coalition had the support of various radical right wing parties as well. The Bloc wanted to continue the patriotic union sacrée which was Raymond Poincaré's coalition during World War I. The bloc won with 53% of the vote.

The National Bloc election campaign focused on two principal issues: Patriotism and fear of Bolshevism.

- Patriotism: The National Bloc stressed the importance of the union sacrée and praised World War I veterans. It complained that the Treaty of Versailles lacked more German concessions, particularly the annexation of the Ruhr. The campaign was based around the slogan, "Germany will pay!" The party platform was based on programs that would be financed through German war reparations.
- Fear of Bolshevism: Several strikes following the end of the war, along with the Russian Revolution, increased anti-communist sentiment in France.

== Composition ==
Party	Main ideology	Leader/s
Republican Federation	Conservatism	Auguste Isaac
Democratic Republican Alliance	Liberal conservatism	Charles Jonnart
Independent Radicals	Social liberalism	Pierre-Étienne Flandin
Miscellaneous Right	Right-wing politics	Various

== Electoral results ==
Chamber of Deputies
Election year	# of overall votes	% of overall vote	# of overall seats won	+/–	Leader
1919	4,353,025 (#1)	53.42	433 / 613	–	Alexandre Millerand
