= Henri Barboux =

French lawyer and politician (1834–1910)

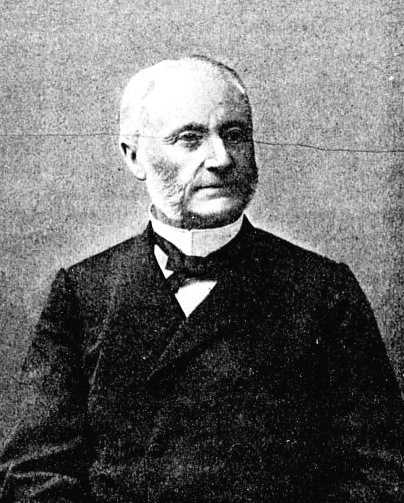
Henri Barboux (before 1908)

Louis Henri Barboux (24 September 1834, Châteauroux, Indre – 25 April 1910, Paris) was a French financial lawyer, politician, and member of the Académie française.

Barboux was the lawyer for Sarah Bernhardt in her 1880 breach-of-contract suit against the Comédie-Française, and famously represented canal developer Ferdinand de Lesseps in the court trials of the financial Panama scandals beginning in 1892.

Despite the political controversies attached to the Panama scandals, Barboux was elected member of the Académie française in 1907 and served only briefly before his death. His speeches were collected in three volumes in 1889 and 1890.

Barboux is buried in the Montparnasse Cemetery, and a short street named in his honor lies in the 14th arrondissement of Paris.
