= 1936 French legislative election =

- 26 April 1936 (first round); 3 May 1936 (second round)

All 612 seats in the Chamber of Deputies 307 seats needed for a majority
- Registered: 11,768,491
- Turnout: 84.45%
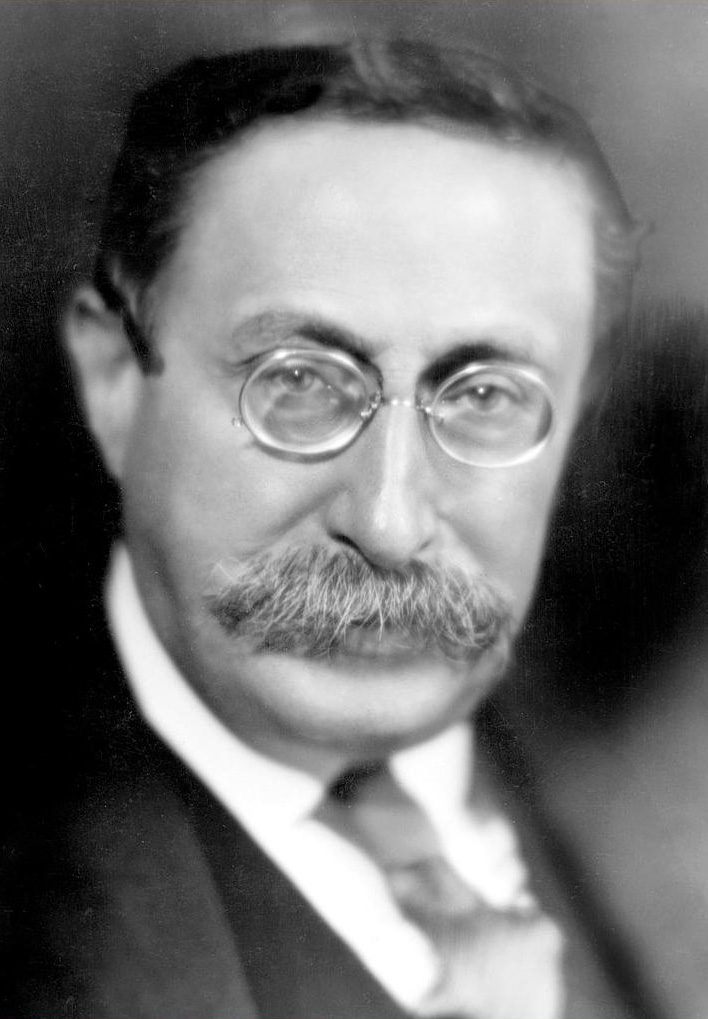

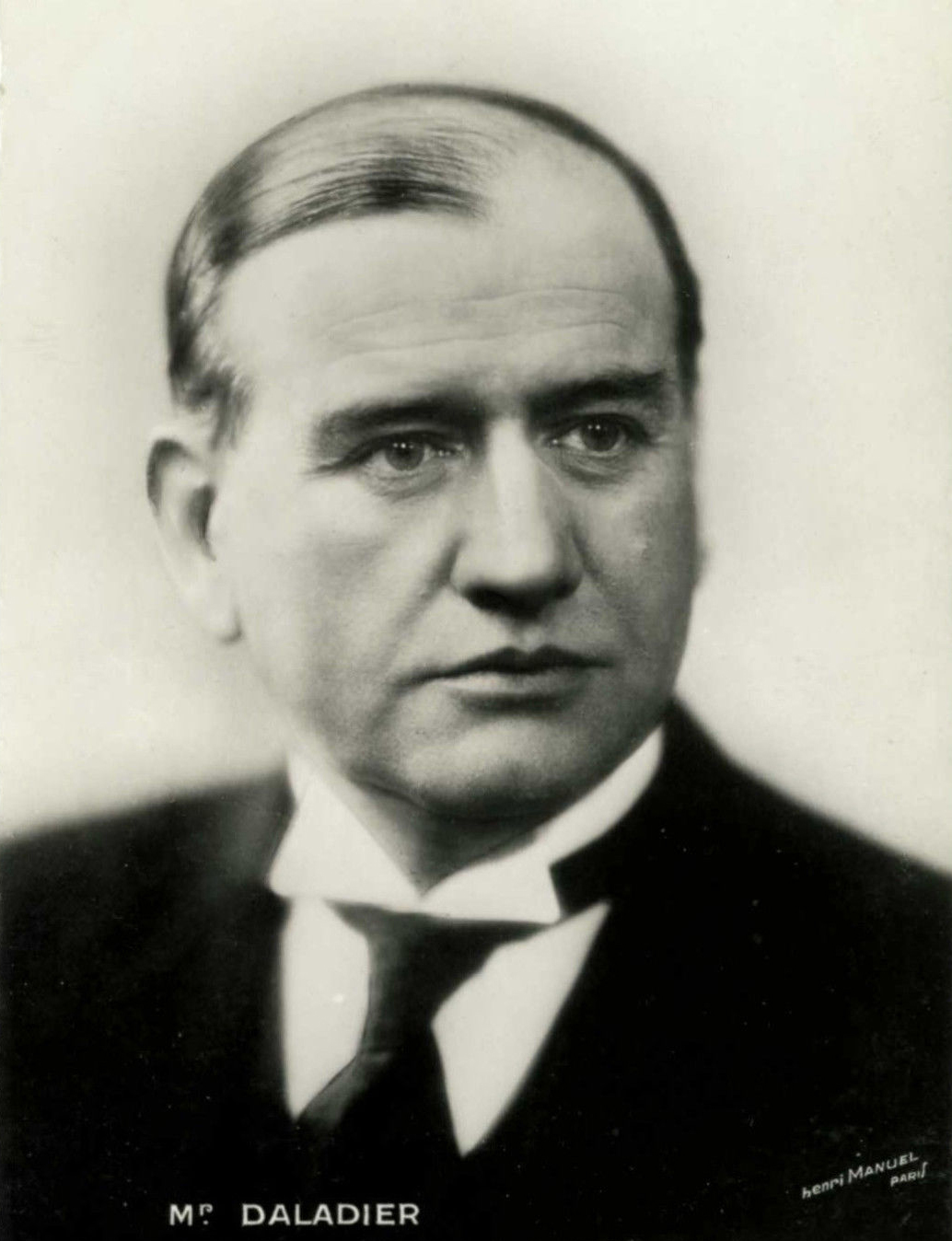

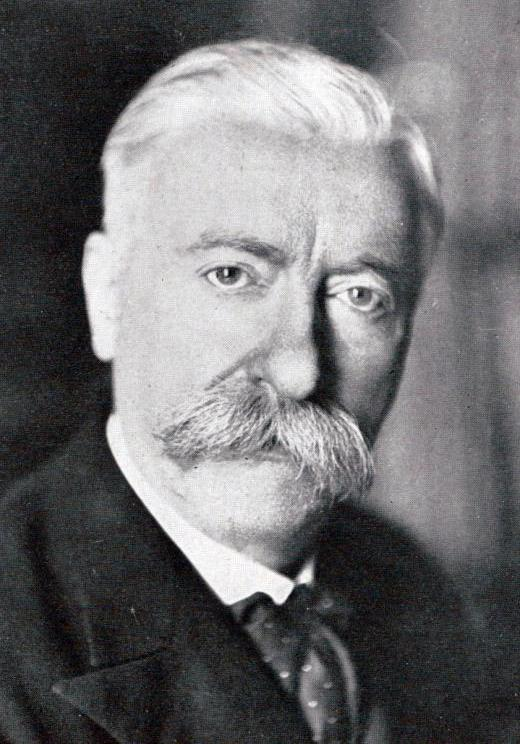

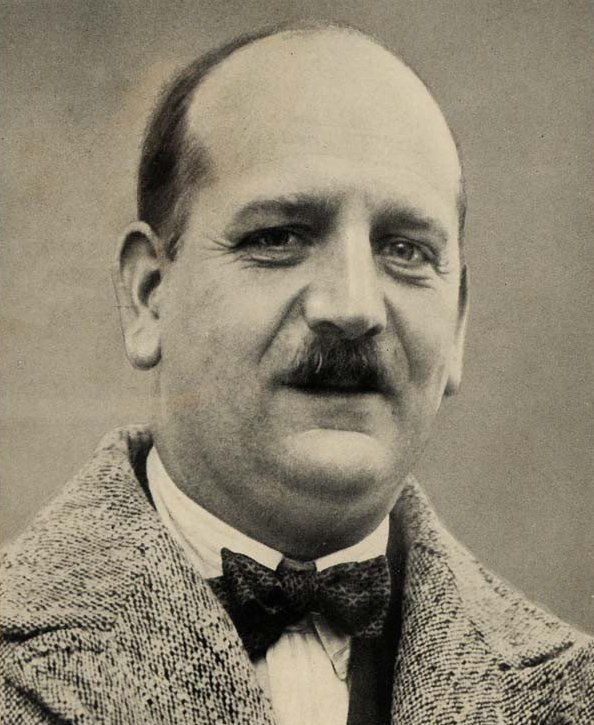

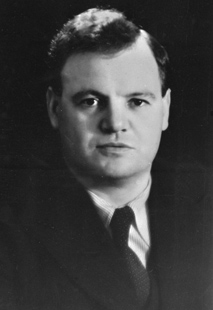
	Majority party	Minority party	Third party
Leader	Léon Blum	Édouard Daladier	Louis Marin
Party	SFIO	PRRRS	Republican Union
Alliance	Popular Front	Popular Front	National Front
Last election	129 seats	157 seats	76 seats
Seats won	149	111	128
Seat change	▲20	▼46	▲52
Popular vote	1,955,306	1,422,611	1,666,004
Percentage	19.86%	14.45%	16.92%
Swing	▼0.65pp	▼4.73pp	▲4.04pp
	Fourth party	Fifth party
Leader	Pierre-Étienne Flandin	Maurice Thorez
Party	Republican Left	PCF
Alliance	National Front	Popular Front
Last election	72 seats	12 seats
Seats won	95	72
Seat change	▲23	▲60
Popular vote	2,536,294	1,502,404
Percentage	25.76%	15.26%
Swing	▲12.19pp	▲6.94pp
Government before election
Albert Sarraut II
Elected Government
Léon Blum I
SFIO (Popular Front)

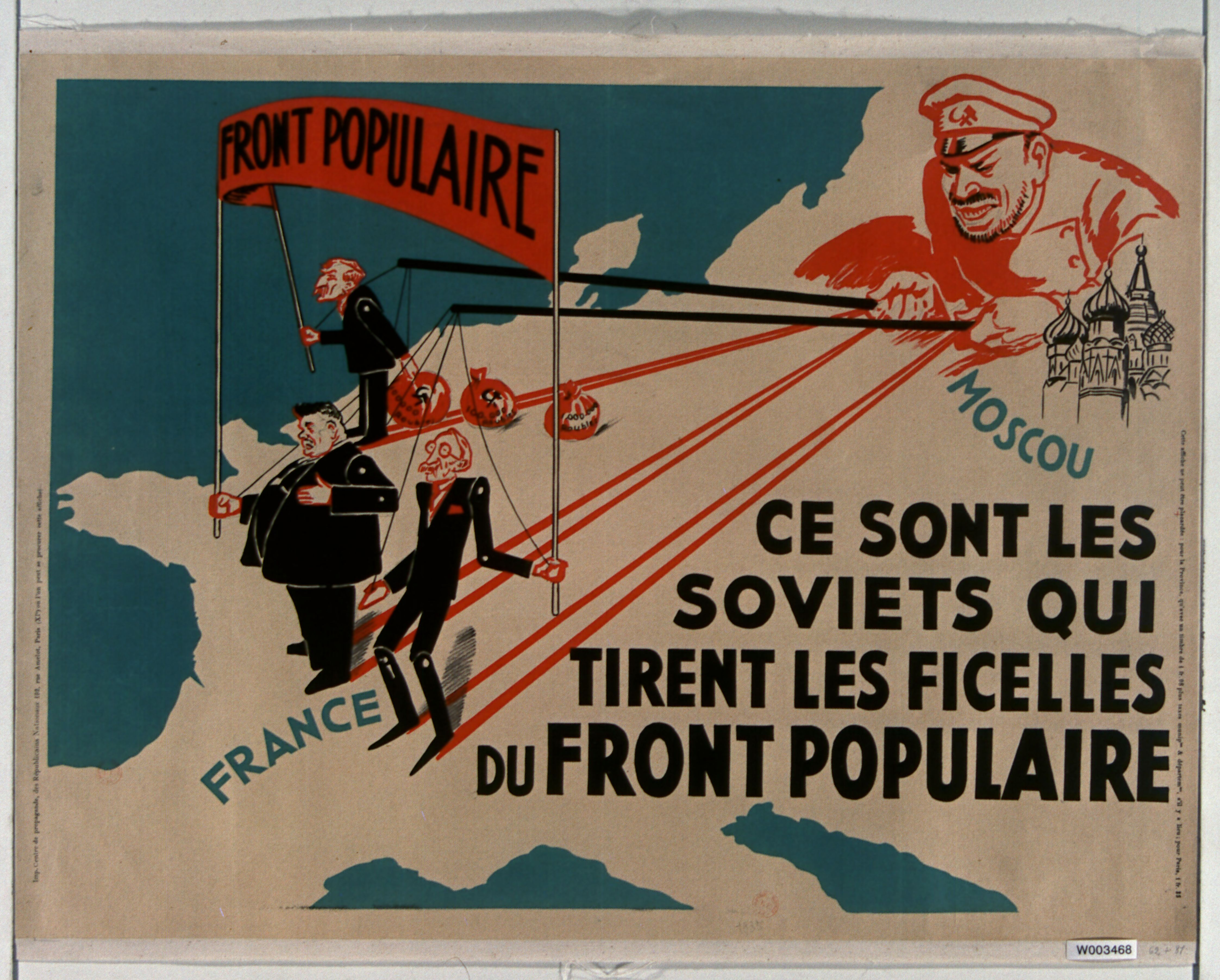
Political poster (1936) claiming that the Popular Front was under Soviet control.

Legislative elections were held in France on 26 April and 3 May 1936, the last elections before World War II. The number of candidates set a record, with 4,807 running for election to the Chamber of Deputies. In the Seine Department alone, there were 1,402 candidates. The legislative election was the last before women were granted the right to vote in April 1944.

The Popular Front, a broad centre-left electoral alliance composed of the social-democratic French Section of the Workers' International (SFIO), the social-liberal Radical-Socialists, the French Section of the Communist International (SFIC), and associated smaller left-wing groups, won power from the conservative coalition that had governed since the 6 February 1934 crisis. Léon Blum became president of the council.

== Results ==
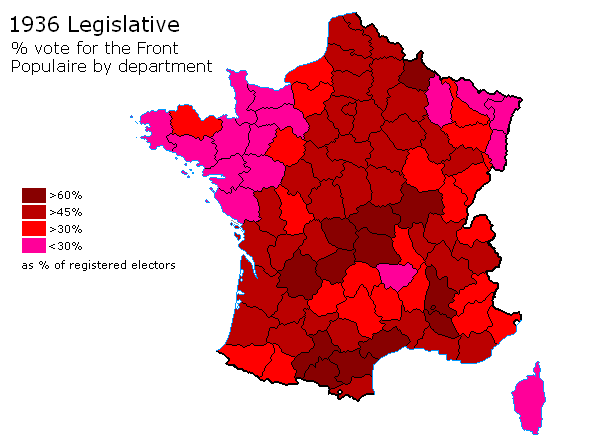
Vote strength for the Popular Front

The SFIC, predecessor of the Communist Party, more than tripled its seats total from 11 SFIC and 9 Union Ouvrière deputies in 1932 to 72 in 1936. The party made gains in industrialized suburbs and working-class areas of major cities. They also progressed in rural central and southwestern France (e.g., Dordogne, Lot-et-Garonne) The Radicals lost votes to the SFIO and SFIC, but also to the right. The SFIO declined slightly. In working-class suburbs, the party declined, but it gained votes in Brittany, to the dismay of the right. Only 174 seats were elected in the first round, 424 were decided in a run-off. The right fared better in the second round.

Graph of the party split among 612 seats.
Party or alliance		Votes	%	Seats
Popular Front	French Section of the Workers' International	1,955,306	19.86	149
Popular Front	French Communist Party	1,502,404	15.26	72
Popular Front	Radical Socialist Party	1,422,611	14.45	111
Popular Front	Socialist Republican Union	748,600	7.60	29
Popular Front	Miscellaneous left	748,600	7.60	28
Popular Front	Total	5,628,921	57.16	389
National Front	Republican Left	2,536,294	25.76	95
National Front	Republican Union	1,666,004	16.92	128
National Front	Total	4,202,298	42.67	223
Others		16,047	0.16	0
Total		9,847,266	100.00	612
Valid votes		9,847,266	99.09	
Invalid/blank votes		90,692	0.91	
Total votes		9,937,958	100.00	
Registered voters/turnout		11,768,491	84.45	
Source: Mackie & Rose, Nohlen & Stöver, Quid
