= Democratic and Republican Union =

The Democratic and Republican Union (French: Union républicaine et démocratique, URD) was the parliamentary group of the conservative Republican Federation in the Chamber of Deputies of France during the French Third Republic (1870–1940). Other French parties have used similar names, such as the Union of Democrats for the Republic (UDR) and the Union for French Democracy (UDF).

== See also ==
- Liberalism and radicalism in France
- Republican Federation
- Sinistrisme
