= 1919 French legislative election =

- 16 and 30 November 1919

All 613 seats in the Chamber of Deputies
- Registered: 11,445,702
- Turnout: 8,249,990 (72.08%)
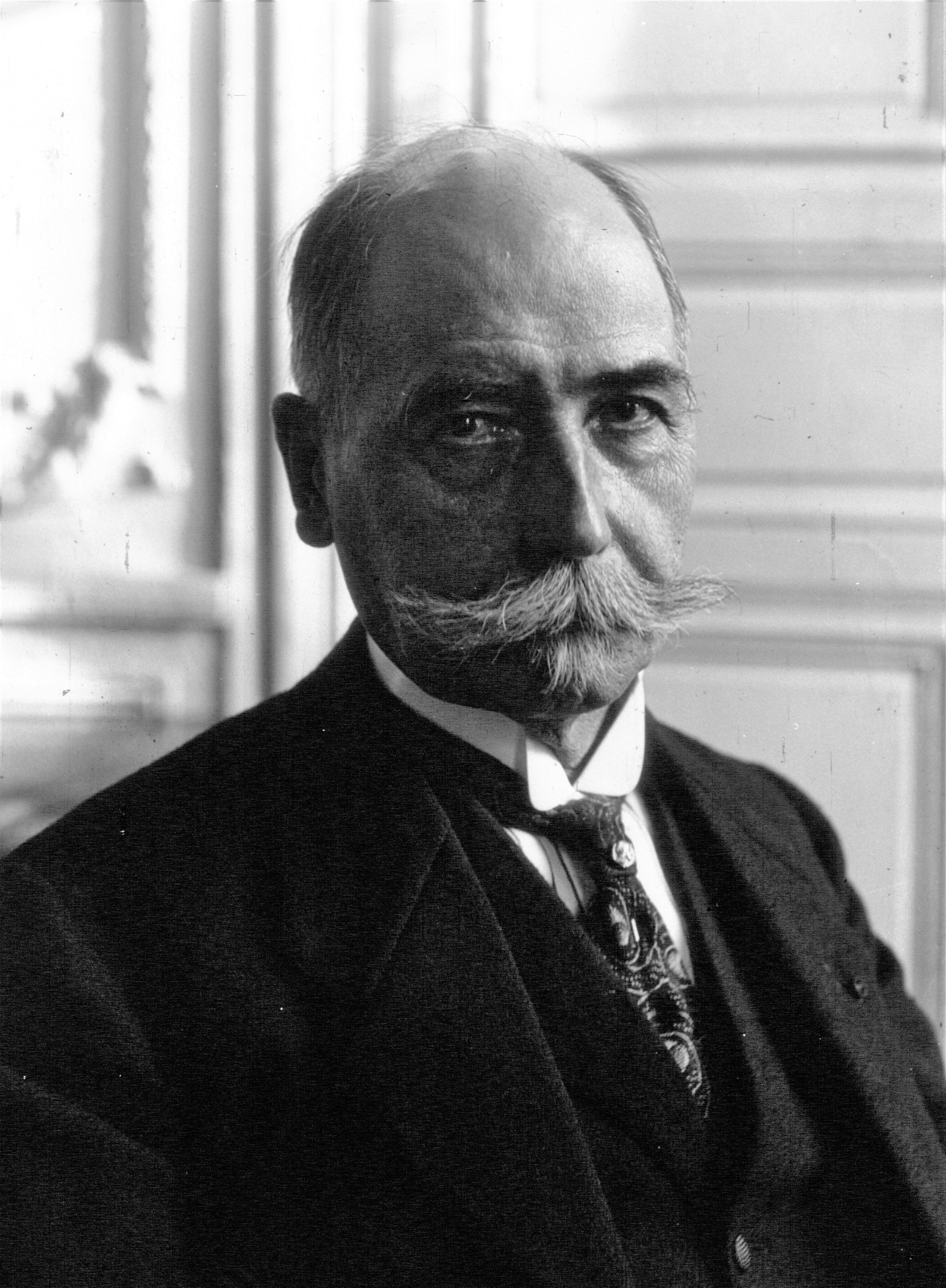

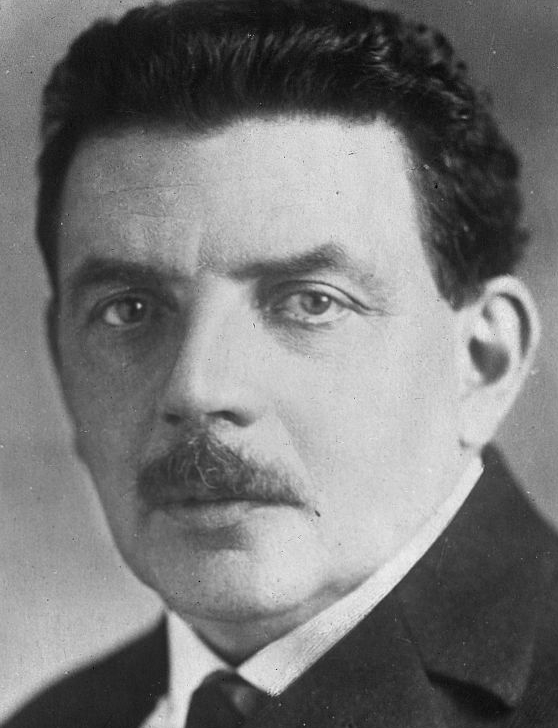

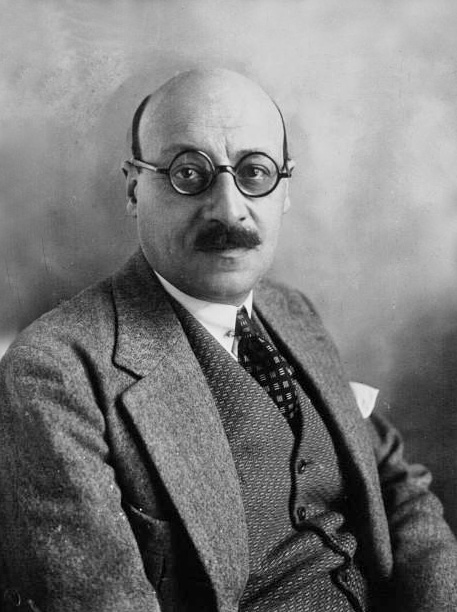
	Majority party	Minority party	Third party
Leader	Auguste Isaac	Édouard Herriot	Ludovic-Oscar Frossard
Party	Republican Union	PRV	SFIO
Leader's seat	Rhône	Rhône	Seine (lost)
Seats won	201	106	67
Seat change	▲105	▼36	▼35
Popular vote	1,819,691	1,420,381	1,728,663
Percentage	22.33%	17.43%	21.22%
Swing		▼15.18%	▲4.25%
Prime Minister before election
Georges Clemenceau
Independent
Elected Prime Minister
Alexandre Millerand
Independent

Legislative elections were held in France on 16 and 30 November 1919, the first after World War I.

== Electoral system ==
Proportional representation by department replaced the two-round system by arrondissements in use since 1889. However, a provision of the system allowed a party to win all the seats in a certain constituency if it received over 50% of all votes cast.

== Campaign ==
The formation of electoral lists needed to take into account of three factors: on one hand, the tendency of the opinion to think that the Union sacrée needed to be prolonged in peacetime in order to solve the new problems of France of the post-war period; on the other hand, the refusal of the French Section of the Workers' International (SFIO), then in crisis, to discuss the question of Bolshevism. To preserve their unity, the Socialists decided in April 1919 not to conclude any agreement ahead of the legislative elections. This decision isolated the radicals, forced to give up a new alliance of the left, and allowed an aggressive campaign of the right and centre directed against the SFIO, accused of Bolshevism; finally, the persistence of partisan divisions within the right. The monarchists of Action française were isolated, but the nationalists, the Catholics, and the "progressives" (who are in fact the moderate republicans from the pre-war period) brought together the moderate republicans of the center-right, gathered in several small organizations, all members of Democratic Alliance, but rejected any possibility of an agreement with the radicals. The radicals were found stuck between the SFIO which hesitated between radicalization and the status quo, and a right more than ever anti-leftist.

Following complex negotiations, 324 lists were formed. The Socialists chose homogeneous lists, while the radicals divided between lists allied with the center-right and isolated lists. The lists of the Bloc National gathered the members of the Democratic Republican Alliance, the progressives, the nationalists and the Catholics. Alexandre Millerand managed to gather around him a very broad coalition in his stronghold of the second sector of the Seine by advocating a reinforcement of the presidential powers.

== Results ==
The results were confusing. Radicals, particularly when they were isolated, tended to decline, and the victory of the Bloc National was without ambiguity: a blue wave hit the Chamber of Deputies, called the "blue horizon chamber", because of the great number of ex-World War I servicemen who sat there (44% of the total of the deputies). This victory would remain the largest victory of the right and the centre-right until the 1968 legislative election. 60% of the deputies in this legislature were newly elected.

Party	Votes	%	Seats
Republican Union	1,819,691	22.33	201
French Section of the Workers' International	1,728,663	21.22	67
Radical Party	1,420,381	17.43	106
Conservatives and independents	1,139,794	13.99	88
Democratic Republican Alliance	889,177	10.91	79
Independent Radicals	504,363	6.19	51
Republican-Socialist Party	283,001	3.47	17
Independent Socialists	147,053	1.80	5
Veterans	128,004	1.57	2
Other parties	87,963	1.08	2
Total	8,148,090	100.00	616
Valid votes	8,148,090	98.76	
Invalid/blank votes	101,900	1.24	
Total votes	8,249,990	100.00	
Registered voters/turnout	11,445,702	72.08	
Source: Mackie & Rose, France Politique
