= Democratic Republican Alliance =

Centre-right political party in France (1901–1949)

Democratic Alliance Alliance démocratique
- Leader: Pierre Waldeck-Rousseau; Alexandre Ribot; Raymond Poincaré; André Tardieu; Pierre-Étienne Flandin
- Founded: 21 October 1901; 124 years ago
- Dissolved: 6 January 1949; 77 years ago (formal dissolution in 1978)
- Split from: Progressive Republicans
- Merged into: National Centre of Independents
- Ideology: Conservative liberalism Secularism (French); Laissez-faire
- Political position: Centre-right
- National affiliation: National Bloc (1919–1924); RGR (1946–1949)
- Colours: Gold

The Democratic Alliance (French: Alliance démocratique, AD), originally called Democratic Republican Alliance (Alliance républicaine démocratique, ARD), was a French political party created in 1901 by followers of Léon Gambetta such as Raymond Poincaré, who would be president of the Council in the 1920s. The party was originally formed as a centre-left gathering of moderate liberals, independent Radicals who rejected the new left-leaning Radical-Socialist Party, and Moderate Republicans (Gambetta and the like), situated at the political centre and to the right of the newly formed Radical-Socialist Party. However, after World War I and the parliamentary disappearance of monarchists and Bonapartists it quickly became the main centre-right party of the Third Republic. It was part of the National Bloc right-wing coalition which won the elections after the end of the war. The ARD successively took the name "Democratic Republican Party" (Parti Républicain Démocratique, PRD), and then "Social and Republican Democratic Party" (Parti Républicain Démocratique et Social), before becoming again the AD.

The ARD was largely discredited after supporting the Vichy regime during World War II, an option strongly supported by its major leader Pierre-Étienne Flandin and other members such as Joseph Barthélemy. The centre-right party tried to reform itself under the direction of Joseph Laniel, who had taken part in the Resistance. It temporarily joined the Rally of Republican Lefts (Rassemblement des gauches républicaines, RGR) before merging into the National Center of Independents and Peasants (Centre national des indépendants et paysans, CNIP). The AD, which in contrast to the French Section of the Workers' International (SFIO) or the French Communist Party (PCF), never became a mass political party founded on voting discipline (in these left-wing parties deputies usually vote in agreement with the party's consensus), turned at that time in little more than an intellectual circle whose members met during suppers. However, it was dissolved in only 1978, long after its effective disappearance from the political scene.

Under the Third Republic, the majority of the AD's deputies sat in the Left Republicans (Républicain de Gauche) group, the main centre-right parliamentary formation (due to a particularity called sinistrisme right-wing politicians took some time to accept the label 'right-wing', as republicanism was traditionally associated with the left-wing and the right-wing traditionally meant some form of monarchism: see Legitimist and Orléanist).

== History ==
=== Early years ===
In 1901, it supported the Bloc des gauches around Waldeck-Rousseau, even if it tried to stand out by 1902. However, it supported the policy of the bloc until 1907, when the presidency was entrusted to Émile Combes (1902–1905), who imposed for the first time the left-right divide. The Alliance demonstrated its difference from the right (the Republican Federation and the ALP) by supporting the 1905 law. Above all, the ARD encouraged political circles including Alliancists and Radicals.

Faced with the disintegration of the bloc and the emergence of socialism, the Alliance sought to establish in 1907 a democratic bloc with the right which demonstrated its willingness to reinstate the discredited right to power in France. Between 1912 and 1914, the ARD supported the right-wing governments which included Raymond Poincaré, Aristide Briand and Louis Barthou. During the same period, the Alliance operated a shift to the right on the political spectrum and ended the policy of mutual withdrawals with the Radical-Socialists in electoral runoffs.

Meanwhile, the Alliance was transformed into a real party in 1911 by becoming the Republican Democratic Party (PRD). This strengthening of its structures was accompanied by an increase in its number of parliamentarians (from 39 MPs in 1902 to 125 1910 and fifty senators in 1910) and that of its supporters (around 30,000 at the beginning of the 1910s). Several leaders of the ARD in 1914 tried to form with Aristide Briand and the moderate left a Federation of the Lefts.

Undoubtedly, the Alliance weighed heavily on national policy as shown by the presence of its members in high cabinet positions (Émile Loubet, Armand Fallières and Raymond Poincaré as Presidents of the Republic and Louis Barthou and Raymond Poincaré as Presidents of the council as well as many ministries).

=== Government partner ===
At the end of the war, the Alliance promoted new goals developed during its creation, namely that of creating a concentration of the centers. With its 140 MPs, it organized and led in this direction the National Bloc (1919–1924). The experience was not successful because the Alliance became a prisoner of the right which constituted the bulk of the parliamentary majority, thus the failure of Aristide Briand cabinet (1921–1922) convinced its leaders to find practical ways to realize the doctrine of the just-middle despite the fact that one of its members, Raymond Poincaré, occupied the post of President of the Council between 1922 and 1924.

The Alliance focused its political doctrine in line with that which prevailed when it was created, even though the generation of pre-war faded (Adolphe Carnot, Charles Pallu de la Barrière and so forth) and that a new generation took over, such as Charles Jonnart its new president in 1920. Known as the PRDS, the Alliance professed its willingness to co-operate with the Radical-Socialist Party.

The party became the backbone of government including the Radical-Socialist Party following the fall of the Cartel des Gauches. Nevertheless, the Alliance could not get the Radicals to rally around a centrist party, the opposition crystallizing around the issue of secularism, the intervention of the state or in terms of foreign policy (contrast between Aristide Briand and Raymond Poincaré).

=== Decline ===
Pierre-Étienne Flandin took the chair of the Alliance in 1933 with the aim to reorganize the party in a way which Louis Marin had done ten years earlier with the Republican Federation. Until then a grouping more than a party, the Alliance became a party which established a hierarchy and became more centralized. The party expanded its regional structures and increased its membership to about 20,000 in 1936.

Flandin's leadership marked the end of the Alliance's overtures to the Radicals. However, the Alliance was torn on the doctrinal front. Common ground on the basis of the defense of institutions, the middle class, and the rejection of the extremes disintegrated due to divergent views adopted by factions of the Alliance: Republicans of the Left (Flandin), Independents of the Left (René Besse), and Republican Centre (Paul Reynaud and André Tardieu). These divergences were apparent during the left-wing Popular Front government under Léon Blum. Some Alliance members moderately supported the measures of the government, while others were vehemently opposed.

The party divided severely in 1938, with a pacifist majority (Flandin) supporting the Munich Agreement and a hawkish minority (Reynaud) opposed. More profoundly, this division also reflected the significant disputes within the party concerning the reform of the state and institutions between 1933 and 1934.

After that, the Alliance struggled to maintain a centrist position in a Republic no longer managed by the centre. It became on the contrary a party which showed the different opinions chosen by the men from the Republican and parliamentary rights to address the social and political crises of the thirties.

== Doctrine ==
The Democratic Alliance was a centre-right party which occupied between 1901 and 1940 a central position on the political spectrum and this despite the iron rule of French politics developed by René Rémond which said that each party would evolve further to the left or right due to the development of new political movements. Thus, even if the leaders of the Alliance saw the party as the incarnation of the centre-left in the wake of the parliamentary group formed by Léon Say (1871–1896), the party shifted to the right in Parliament due to two factors, namely the downfall of the monarchist and Bonapartist right and the rise of the new left (socialism and later communism) as well as new centrist parties such as the League of the Young Republic and the Popular Democratic Party).

By its values and behaviors, the AD opposed the socialist left, but also the right (Popular Liberal Action and later the Republican Federation). Like the Radical-Socialist Party, the Alliance adhered to the Republic and what constituted the Republic, that is the law of separation of church and state in 1905 or the quest for truth in the Dreyfus affair. Unlike the Rad-Soc doctrine, it aspired to unite all Republicans and to impose the right and left a third way, that of the combination of centers around the phrase "no reaction nor revolution".

Its political culture was resolutely centrist, incorporating values of both left (the reference to the French Revolution, the defense of freedom and a reformist agenda) and right (law and order, the defense of liberalism and opposition to statism and collectivism). The theme of gradual reform was seen by the Alliance as the antidote to the opponents of the Republic, namely the collectivists (the French Section of the Workers' International and the French Communist Party).

== Party platform ==
Its creation reflects the will to oppose the polarization due to the progressive division during the Dreyfus affair and impose a three-party system leading to the Republic of the just-middle theorized by François Guizot.

The ARD was created by the progressives who supported Captain Alfred Dreyfus and opposed those who followed Jules Méline in opposition to the President of the Council Pierre Waldeck-Rousseau. At the instigation of the latter, the Democratic Republican Alliance was founded on 23 October 1901 by engineer Adolphe Carnot (brother of former French President Sadi Carnot), the deputies Henry Blanc, Edmond Halphen and publicist Charles Pallu de la Barrière. The Alliance built strong support networks with the Ligue des droits de l'homme (including Paul Stapfer), the League of Education and former political networks around Jules Ferry, Léon Gambetta and Léon Say.

Its initial recruitment is that of the Parisian elite (including scientists) and the provincial notables. Even if the party's principal leaders were often related to business, the majority of its elected officials opposed the wishes of businessmen, in particular on social policies.

== Names ==
- Democratic Republican Alliance (French: Alliance Républicaine Démocratique, ARD): 1901–1911
- Republican Democratic Party (French: Parti Républicain Démocratique, PRD): 1911–1917
- Democratic Republican Alliance (French: Alliance Républicaine Démocratique, ARD): 1917–1920
- Democratic, Republican, and Social Party (French: Parti Républicain Démocratique et Social, PRDS); 1920–1926
- Democratic Alliance (French: Alliance Démocratique, AD); 1926–1949

== See also ==
- Liberalism and radicalism in France
- France in the twentieth century
- Independent Radicals
- Radical Party (France)
- Sinistrisme

== Bibliography ==
- Rosemonde Samson (2003). L'Alliance républicaine démocratique, une formation de centre. Presses universitaires de Rennes, coll. Carnot.
