= Auguste Isaac =

French politician

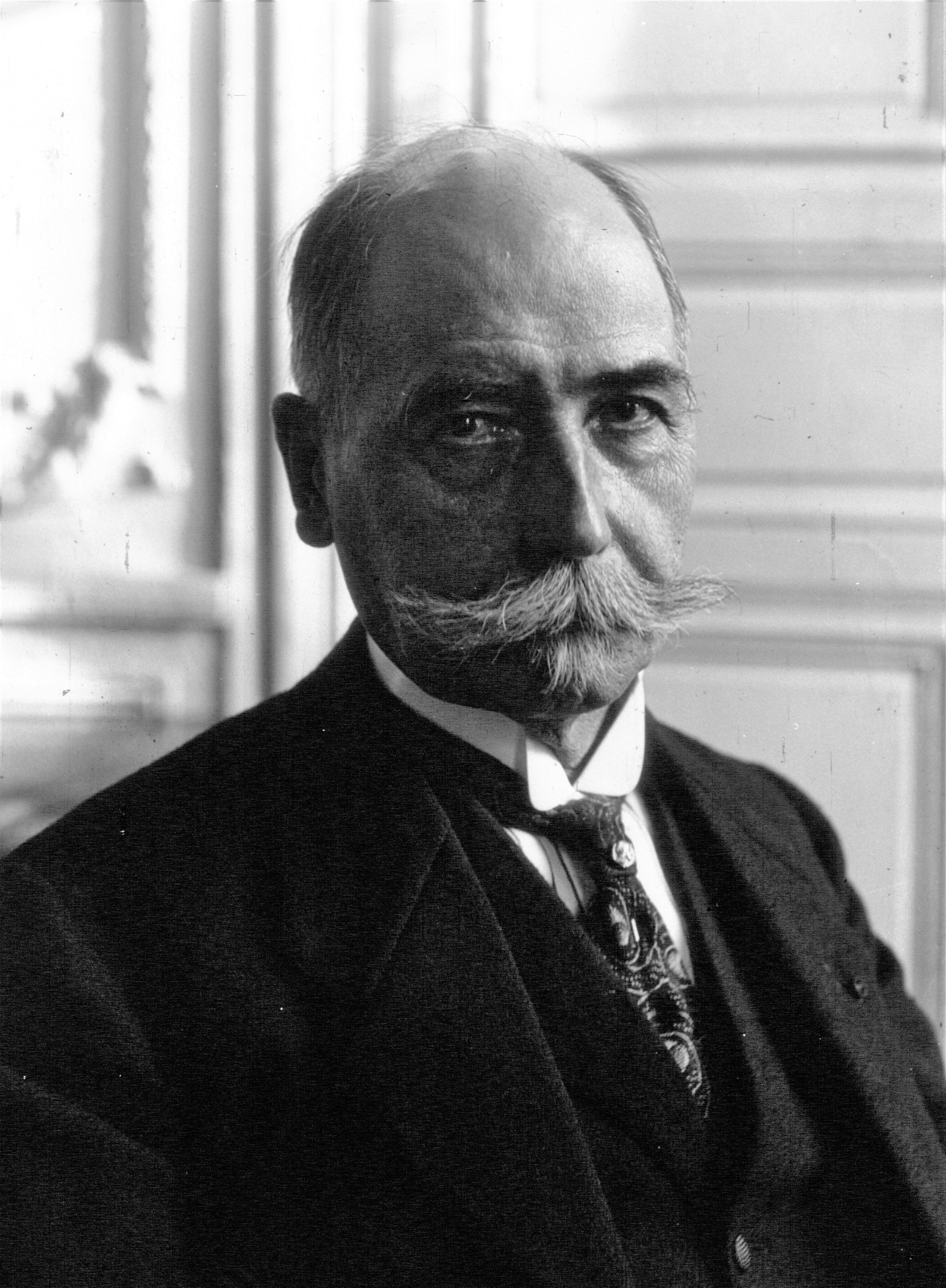
- Born: 6 September 1849; Roubaix, France
- Died: 23 March 1938 (aged 88); Lyon, France
- Occupation: Politician

Auguste Isaac (1849-1938) was a French politician. He served as a member of the Chamber of Deputies from 1919 to 1924, representing Rhône.

Minister of Industry and Commerce between 1920 and 1921, Isaac attacked the French fashion industry for its “indecency” during an Anti-pornography Congress in Lyon in 1922.
