= Parochial patronage =

Type of patronage introduced in the late 1800s

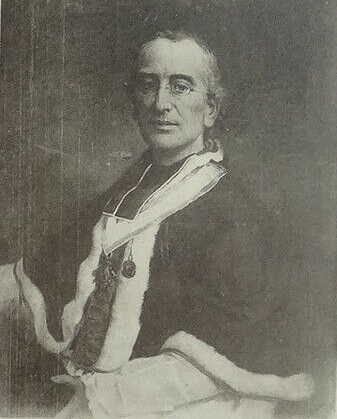
Father Joseph-Marie Timon-David.

Parochial patronage refers to several Catholic and Protestant organizations initially dedicated to the popular education of underprivileged young people. Such institutions appeared in various European countries at the end of the 19th and 20th centuries - in particular, under the name of Orel in the provinces of the Austro-Hungarian Empire – but the term "patronage" remained closely associated with Belgium, and even more so with France, where Catholic patronages were founded in Marseille at the end of the Consulate by Abbé Jean-Joseph Allemand. Abbé Timon-David later took up the idea, and then widely developed within congregations such as the Brothers of the Christian Schools, Jean Bosco's Salesians, Frédéric Ozanam's Brothers of Saint Vincent de Paul and the Dominican Third Order in the early 20th century.

In parallel with social Catholicism, these institutions developed in parishes in France at the end of the 19th century. They led to the creation of a sports federation in 1898, a few years after Belgium. In 1903, this federation became the French Federation of Gymnastics and Sports Patronages and, in 1968, the French Federation of Sport and Culture. In 1905, with the law on the separation between Church and State, the patronages adopted the status of associations under the law of 1901. Between the two world wars and after 1945, the number of patronages grew rapidly. Since 1965, however, the pastoral decisions of the Church of France have forced them to secularize, and today's patronages are more often than not simply secular sports and cultural associations, most of which remain attached to their original references.

== From precursors to a federation ==
=== Patronage of religious orders (1800-1870) ===
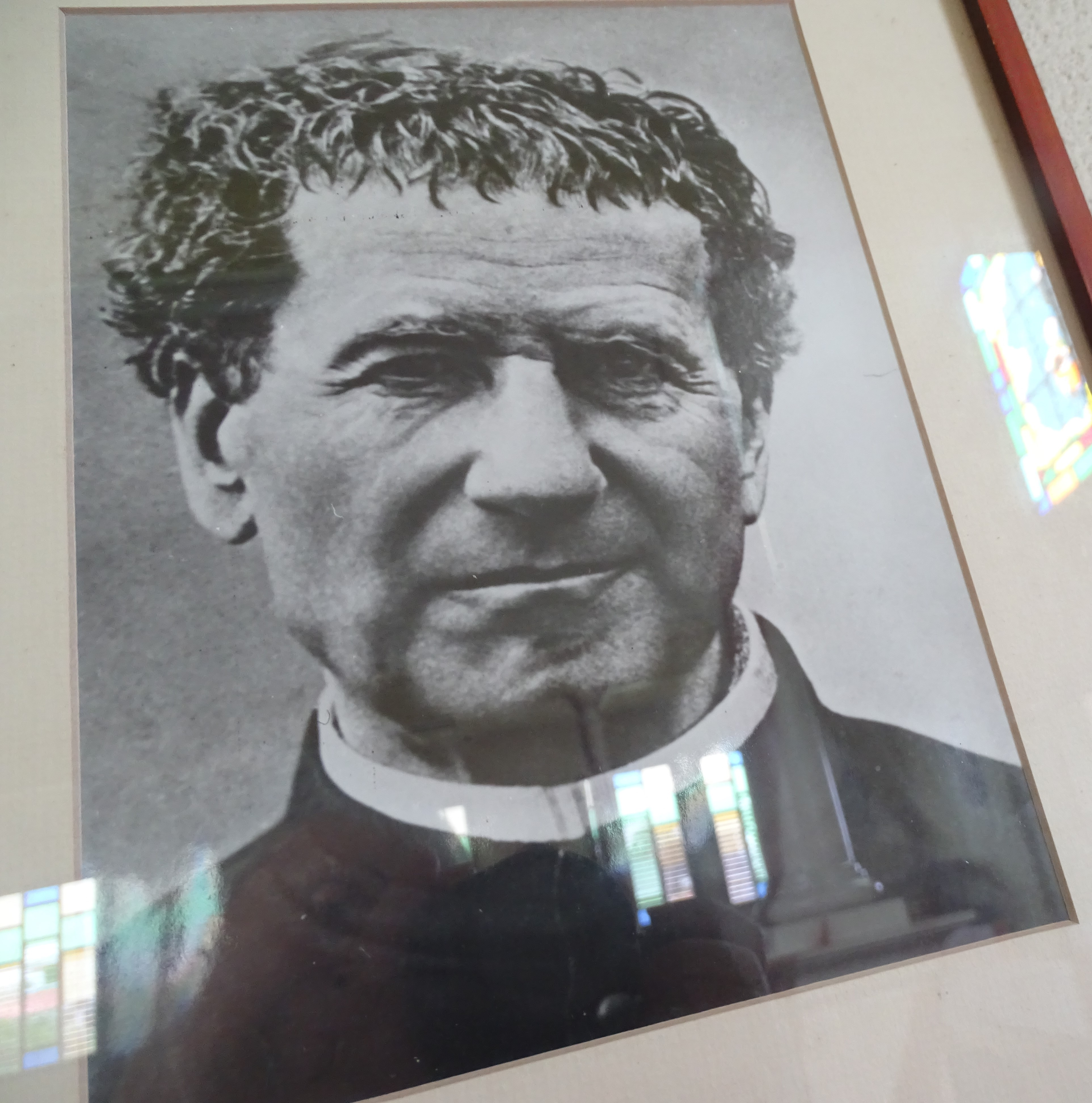
Father Jean Bosco, the founder of the Salésiens.

In France, patronages were founded at the beginning of the 19th century in Marseille by Father Jean-Joseph Allemand, who defined them as "places where people play and pray". By creating a space for physical activities as a complement to study circles, they appeared both within the charitable institutions with a social vocation of the Society of Saint Vincent de Paul - in Paris in 1835, Rennes in 1840 with the Cadets of Brittany - and within those of teaching orders aimed at the elite, such as the Institute of Sorèze with Father Henri Lacordaire. Traditional running, stilt-walking, and ball games made up the bulk of these activities at first, but with Timon David, gymnastics, developed under the Restoration by Colonel Don Francisco Amoros, took pride of place. This trend was reinforced by the Brothers of the Christian Schools, who included it in their school activities.

This practice remained mainly intramural, and the local patronages of the various religious orders generally avoided meeting and clashing. It wasn't until 1855 that a joint magazine was published, while in Paris an association of young workers was founded by Maurice Maignen. In August 1858, some of the directors of these organizations met at a congress in Angers, where they founded the Union of Catholic Workers of France. In 1865, Maignen's association became the Cercle of the Young Workers, (Note: More commonly known as Cercle Montparnasse) and on the eve of the 1870 war, the Society of Catholic Worker Circles was created. The motto of the International Olympic Committee (IOC): Citius, Altius, Fortius, first uttered on March 7, 1891, was borrowed from one of these institutions, the Albert-le-Grand school in Arcueil, run by Father Henri Didon, a member of the first board of directors of the Union of French Athletic Sports Societies (USFSA).

== Parochial patronage (1870-1898) ==
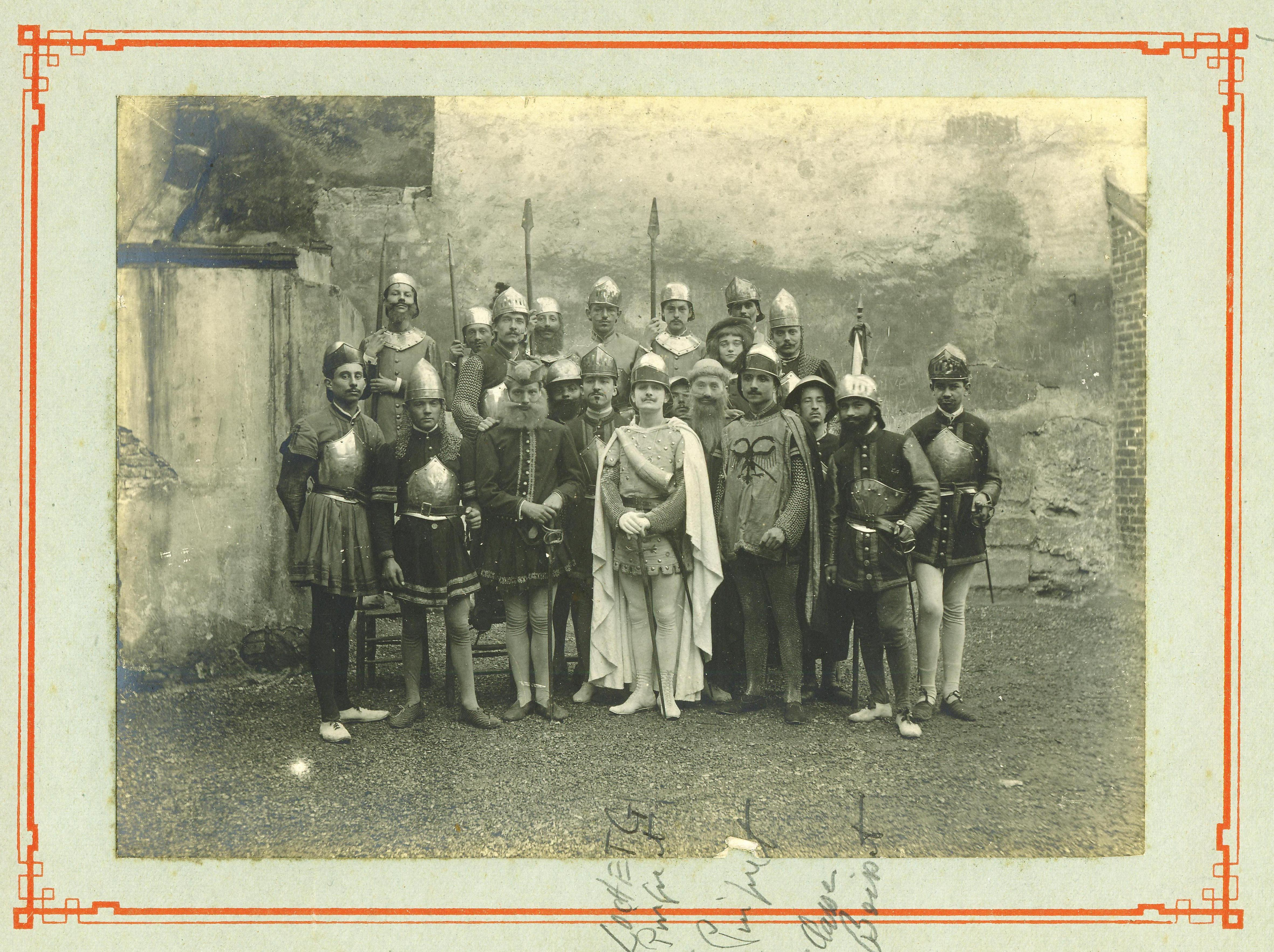
Patronage theater" in the late 19th century.

In 1871, after the defeat of 1870, Count Albert de Mun created the Circles of Catholic Workers. Dr. Paul Michaux, founder of Gymnastics and Sports Federation of French patronages FGSPF, admitted to having participated or collaborated in twenty-five gymnastic, sporting, and military festivals between 1872 and 1897, long before the creation of his federation. It was only after the elections of 1877 and 1879 and the arrival of the Republicans in power that the parish patronages took off, supported by the high clergy and placed under the authority of a vicar-director. Between 1900 and 1960, practically all parishes (except small rural ones) had a "patros" with a sports section, an essential complement to catechism classes. The patronships of the nineteenth century, mainly for apprentices and young workers, then opened up to children of all ages.

In 1888, a commission for patronages and youth works in France was created at the headquarters of the Catholic Institute of Paris (ICP). Three years later, on January 1, 1891, this commission published its bulletin Le Patronage. In addition to the charity conferences and study circles that promoted social Catholicism, physical activities took on such importance that they became a major driving force, both through their civic and school organizations, in the growth of gymnastics and the birth of sport in France.

Before 1914, the three main French federations were the FGSPF, the Union of Gymnastics Societies of France (Note: The Union of French Gymnastics Societies (USGF), founded on September 28, 1873 by Eugène Paz, was the body that ran men's gymnastics in France until April 2, 1942, when it was succeeded by the French Gymnastics Federation (FFG).) (USGF), and the USFSA After 1918, the latter disappeared in favor of specialized federations - French Soccer Federation (FFF), French Athletics Federation (FFA), French Rugby Federation(FFR), then French Basketball Federation(FFBB), French Volleyball Federation (FFVB) - but the other two remained. The anti-clericalism of the Third Republic, especially that of the USGF, led the Episcopate in 1898 to encourage the reunification of its gymnastic sections within a specific organization. These patronages were not limited to metropolitan France; they also developed in the French colonial empire and particularly in Algeria, on the initiative of Mgr Lavigerie.

== Constitution of a federation (1898-1906) ==
Two years after the renewal of the Olympic Games, which emphasized the importance of sport, the Union of Gymnastics and Military Instruction Societies of Patronages and Youth Works of France (USGIMPOJF) was created in 1898, in a generally tense context between lay people and Catholics, the same year as the revision of the Dreyfus trial. In 1901, the organization became the Catholic Gymnastics Societies Federation (FSCG) before becoming the FGSPF in 1903. Paul Michaux, born in Lorraine but adopted in Paris, was not the only one to take up the cause: At the end of 1902, the organization named the Elsaessicher Turnerbund (ETB) which then took the name - Avant-garde du Rhin (AGR) - finally received the recognition from the German authorities that it had been seeking for several years, and the Lyon region, with some thirty patronages at the turn of the century, declared its own Federation of Catholic Gymnastics Societies of the Rhône and South-East at the beginning of 1903, which joined the FGSPF in 1908.

Despite these new federating structures, many patronages continued to join both the USGF and the USFSA, which had previously welcomed them. The hostility of the public authorities and these federations towards those who responded to the Pope's invitation and took part in the gymnastics competition, in 1906, in Rome, brought them under the Catholic umbrella of the FGSPF, which began organizing its championships. This became the French Sports Federation (FSF) in 1947, then the Sports and Cultural Federation of France (FSCF) in 1968. Long before the introduction of the license, participation in gymnastics and music competitions organized by the federation was the most tangible sign of membership.

== From patronage to association ==
=== The time of the battles (1906 - 1919) ===
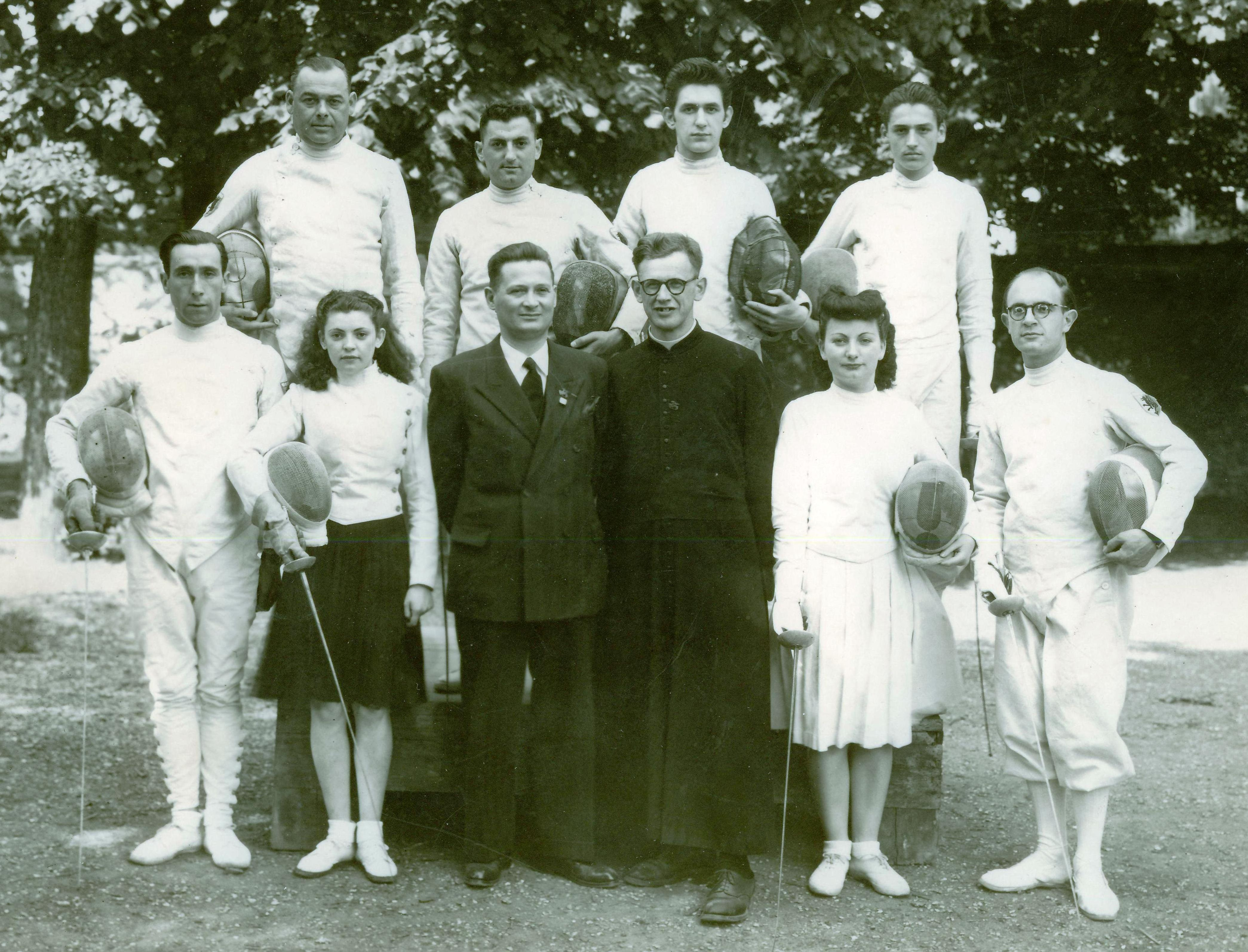
The director's cassock and the president's suit and tie, are symbols of the patronage's family authority

To protect themselves from anticlerical measures, some patronages had already opted for the associative status opened up by the recent law of 1901. In Auxerre, for example, Father Deschamps anticipated the separation of Church and State by declaring his patronage to the prefecture. The movement gained momentum in the fall of 1906. To comply with the law and on the advice of Charles Simon, secretary-general of the FGSPF, many patronages changed their names: Saint-Joseph of Auxerre became the Auxerre Youth Association, Saint-Léon of Bagnolet became Alsace of Bagnolet, the patronage Saint-Honoré of Eylau became Étoile des Deux Lacs, Sister Genevieve's works for great careers became Championnet Sports, soon joined by the Association Championnet, and the patronage Saint-Denys of Argenteuil became Saint-Georges of Argenteuil. Often, as in Cholet with the parallel histories of the Notre-Dame-de-la-Garde and Jeune-France patronages, the former patronage remained to manage non-sporting activities, and the board members of the two associations were almost always the same.

The vicar-director (Note: In important parishes, the parish priest usually entrusts his first curate with the management of the patronage when he does not assume it himself. Sometimes the parish priest runs the girls' oratory, while the vicar runs the boys'.) had to live with a president whose candidacy was usually encouraged by his parish priest. The "patronages" were replaced by the "Patrons", an essential part of the origins of French sport. But their role did not stop there, they also made a major contribution to the development of music through their cliques and brass bands, theater, popular cinema, and summer camps. For a long time, these activities were managed by specific organizations, such as the Theatrical Association of Catholic Works for Popular Education (ATOCEP) and the Federation of Cinematographic Leisure and Culture (FLECC), and it was not until the 1960s that the FSCF took them over.

From 1900 to 1914, the patronages joined in the hope of regaining Alsace and Lorraine and made military training and marksmanship a priority: in 1914, when almost all of them had already adopted the status of the law of 1901, one in three holders of military aptitude certificate had prepared for it within the FGSPF. The FGSPF lost more than 24,000 members during the World War I, but its activities continued unabated. In Paris, they offered their services and unmobilized personnel to the Ministry of War, helped care for the wounded at Gare de l'Est and assisted in agricultural work. On August 4, 1919, they brought 7,000 gymnasts from all over France to Metz to welcome the AGR, the Catholic patronage association of Alsace.

== The Golden Age (1919-1965) ==
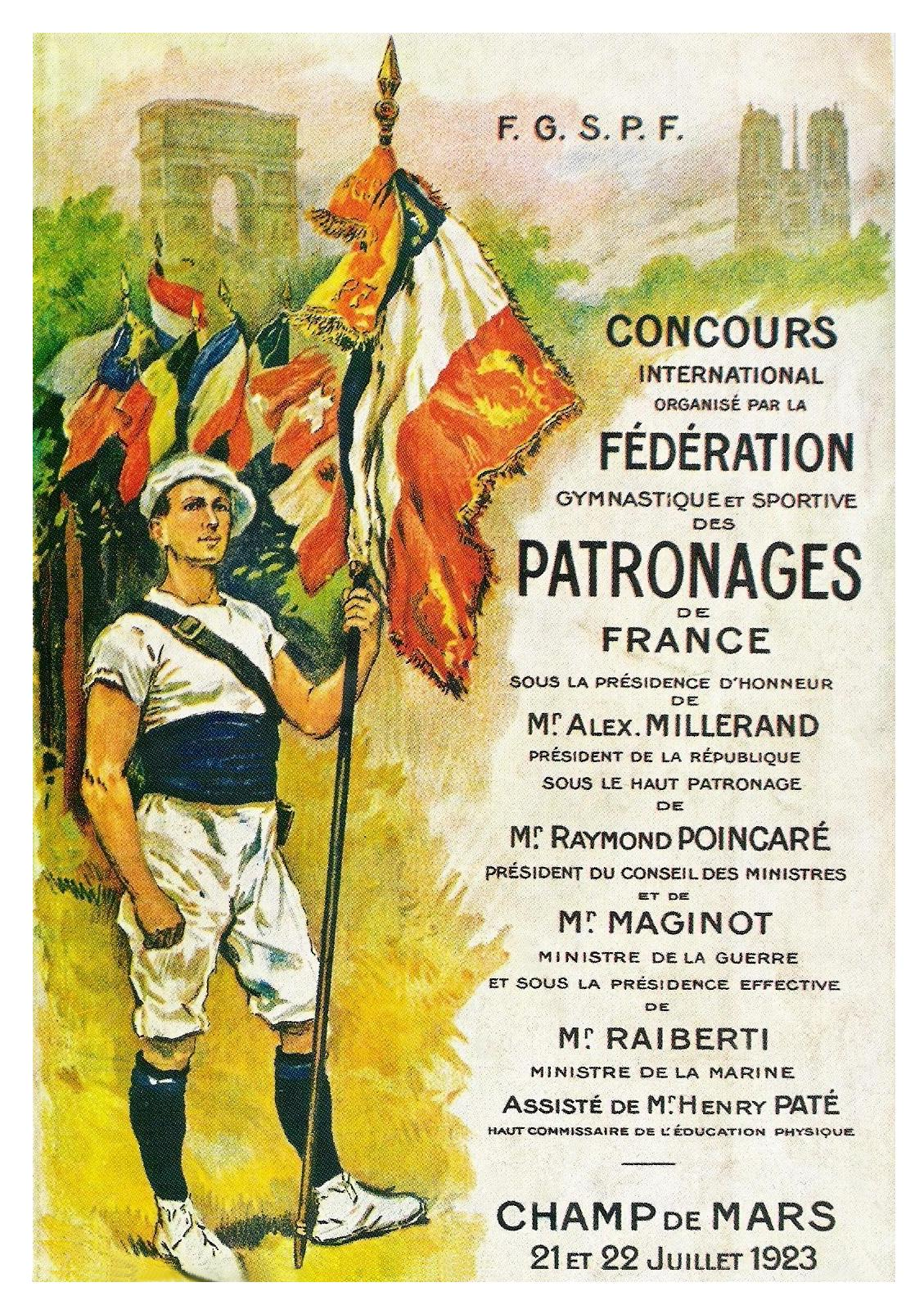
Gymnastics and brass band competitions are highlights of patronage life.

Despite the criticism voiced in certain progressive circles of the clergy against "sports with a taste of war", the end of the First World War marked the beginning of a particularly prosperous era. Between the recent demise of the USFSA and the still nascent development of single-sport federations, their fledgling federation became the largest in France, with 1,500 of its 2,500 patronages officially recognized in 1928. Although gymnastics remained the main activity, other sports also developed, particularly basketball, which was structured in 1920 within the FFA, born from the dissolution of the USFSA at the end of the war. In 1925, in the Paris region alone, the Federation of Patronages had 110 teams, while the FFA had only 57. A patronage from Le Havre founded in 1874, Union Saint-Thomas-d'Aquin, was the first club to be registered by the new FFBB when it became autonomous in 1932.

During the Occupation, the activity of patronages slowed considerably, with many preferring to remain dormant rather than risk the merger with foreign, or even hostile associations imposed by the Sports Charter. A few, such as the Championnet Association in Paris, deliberately joined the Resistance, where their services are recognized today. Leaders and vicars-directors sometimes went underground without putting other members at risk, as in Argenteuil, where a local study shows the strong commitment of directors (Fathers Paul Louis and François Spahnagel) and lay leaders (Lieutenant-Colonel Clément Prudhon and Captain Maurice Weber). The merger of the men's and women's patronages, imposed by the Vichy regime, was not called into question after the Liberation; their revival contributed locally to the national recovery, and they soon returned to their pre-war level of development.

Its members shone at the 1948 London Olympics, where Adrien Rommel won gold for the fencing team and the basketball team, five of whose members came from the patronages, took second place. That same year, the FSF demonstrated the health of its federations by bringing together 12,000 gymnasts and musicians in Paris for its fiftieth anniversary. Basketball experienced exceptional growth within the FSF: each patronage had its team, and the FSF was at the top of the French game. In 1949, the Spartiates d'Oran, the best club in Algeria, were crowned champions of the French Union after defeating the French military team and the Villeurbanne Éveil Lyonnais Sports Association (ASVEL), then champions of Metropolitan France. The FSF (now FSCF), which grouped them together, reached its peak in the 1950s with some 4,200 clubs and 800,000 members.

== Post-Vatican II ==
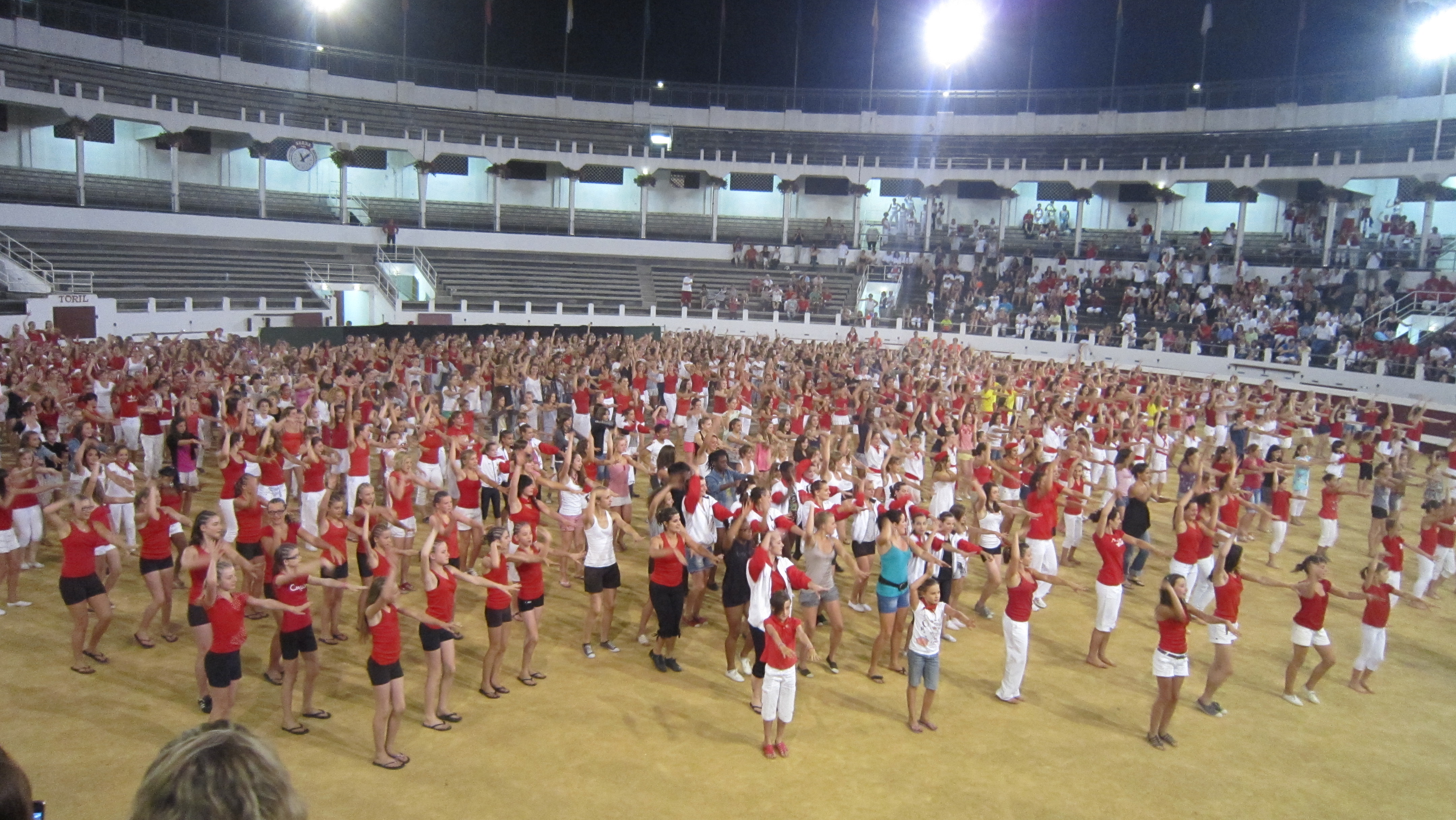
Patronage courses have become major sports events.

The change in the French Church's attitude towards charities following the Second Vatican Council (Note: Scouting at the end of the First World War, and Specialized Catholic Action (JOC, JA, JEC) after 1935, were truly born within the patronages. From the end of the 1960s, scouting was treated in the same way as the patronages, to the benefit of Specialized Catholic Action, which became a priority after Vatican II.) profoundly altered the nature of patronage. Some of the clergy had always expressed reservations about their pastoral value, and even at times strongly criticized the use of this "sport with a taste for war"; in 1988, the title of Professor Gérard Cholvy's book, Le Patronage, ghetto ou Vivier, clearly set out the terms of this debate. The implementation of the council was an opportunity for these detractors to obtain their total outsourcing from parishes and to abolish their directors. For the parish patronages, this meant both denial of the validity of an almost century-old experience and a series of related material losses: the loss of a source of funding (Note: The quest for patronage, the summer camp often associated with it and the parish fair for charity.), the loss of a free "social worker" coupled with an administrator (the priest-director), and often also the loss of historic premises.

The need to use municipal facilities in order to survive forced many of them to accept, in return, the obligation of double membership in delegating associations demanded by certain municipalities. In 1968, to control their flight, the FSF decided to broaden its scope to include the historical cultural activities of the patronages and changed its acronym accordingly. Since the Second Vatican Council, the 3,600 associations affiliated to the FSCF have become Omnisports and cultural associations with an essentially secular orientation, but which explicitly refer to an ethic inherited from their past, and many of them still call themselves "patros".

As with all associations, the activities of the FSCF-affiliated patronages include sports training and cultural workshops (visual arts, theater, choir, dance, twirling) during the week and competitions or meetings on weekends. For some, maintenance and outdoor activities (hiking) play an important role, as does motor development for young children. Some former patrons, now large multisport clubs, join only for these activities. Except gymnastics, which is still very active, the sports disciplines of the FSCF suffer greatly from their dual affiliation, and the attractiveness of the competitions often suffers as a result. What's more, the brass bands, once the pride of the patronages, are becoming increasingly rare.

== A Revival of Patronage ==
In 1994, Cardinal Jean-Marie Lustiger, Archbishop of Paris, approved the creation of a Federation of Cultural, Educational, and Leisure Associations (FACEL) for the Paris diocese, with the aim of "promoting Christian education through cultural and leisure activities, and facilitating access to the catechism in parishes and schools". The new organization, which takes the form of an open-air center, is reminiscent of the "patronages" that used to welcome children on Thursday afternoons when school was not in session. This federation of some fifty leisure associations began to expand into the suburbs and provinces.

New communities are also taking an interest in patronages. For example, the Community of Saint Martin and the brothers and sisters of the Community of Saint-Jean have taken over or founded patronages since the early 2000s.

The revival of the parochial patronage continued in the 21st century with an initiative taken by the founders of the patronage. In 2020, a foundation was created under the auspices of the Raoul Follereau Foundation: the Foundation of Patronages of France, whose purpose is to support welcome centers for inspired youth by the pedagogy of patronage. This support is provided within the framework of the Union for Patronages, which brings together Christian educational organizations to support parochial initiatives. A true incubator for sponsorship, this Union was officially launched on June 28, 2021. The Association for the Training of Entertainment and Leisure Executives ( AFOCAL) has published a guide for sponsorship organizers.

In 2022, under the auspices of the Common Good Fund, the Union of Patronages and the Lapparent Centre joined forces to create a patronage incubator named Esprit de Patronage. The aim is to meet the needs of the growing number of patronage founders. We could be witnessing a real renaissance of patronage in France.

== Some patronages ==
The history of French sport is marked by patronages. The first is football, with the Star of Two Lakes, where two of the founders of the FFF, Charles Simon and Henri Delaunay, cut their teeth, followed by Auxerre Youth Association of Father Deschamps and its historic coach Guy Roux.

It should also be remembered that up until the professionalization of the game, basketball was the exclusive domain of the patrons:

- Saint-Thomas-d'Aquin in Le Havre was the first club to be affiliated to the FFBB when it was founded in 1932;
- Championnet Sports supplied three players to the runner-up team at the 1948 London Olympics;
- The Spartans of Oran were crowned champions of the French community in 1949 after defeating the French military team and ASVEL, the metropolitan champions formed by the merger of the Éveil Sportif Sainte-Marie de la Guillotière of Lyon with a Labour club from Villeurbanne;
- l'Alsace de Bagnolet, preceded by Championnet Sports, was multiple French basketball champion in the 1960s;
- Le patronage du Bon Conseil was founded in 1894 by Father Esquerré at 6 street Albert de Lapparent, Paris 7th arrondissement.

The majority of patronages have since given up on the adventure of professionalism, as la Jeune-France de Cholet did in 1975, giving way to Cholet Basket. Nevertheless, some remain major regional associations, such as la Tour d'Auvergne in Rennes and its neighbor les Cadets de Bretagne, la Cambronnaise de Saint-Sébastien-sur-Loire and la Jeune Garde de Villefranche. But in keeping with the original spirit, many of them work more discreetly with the working classes, such as la Saint-Georges d’Argenteuil, le Chantier de Paris and la Semeuse de Nice.
