= Union nationale (France) =

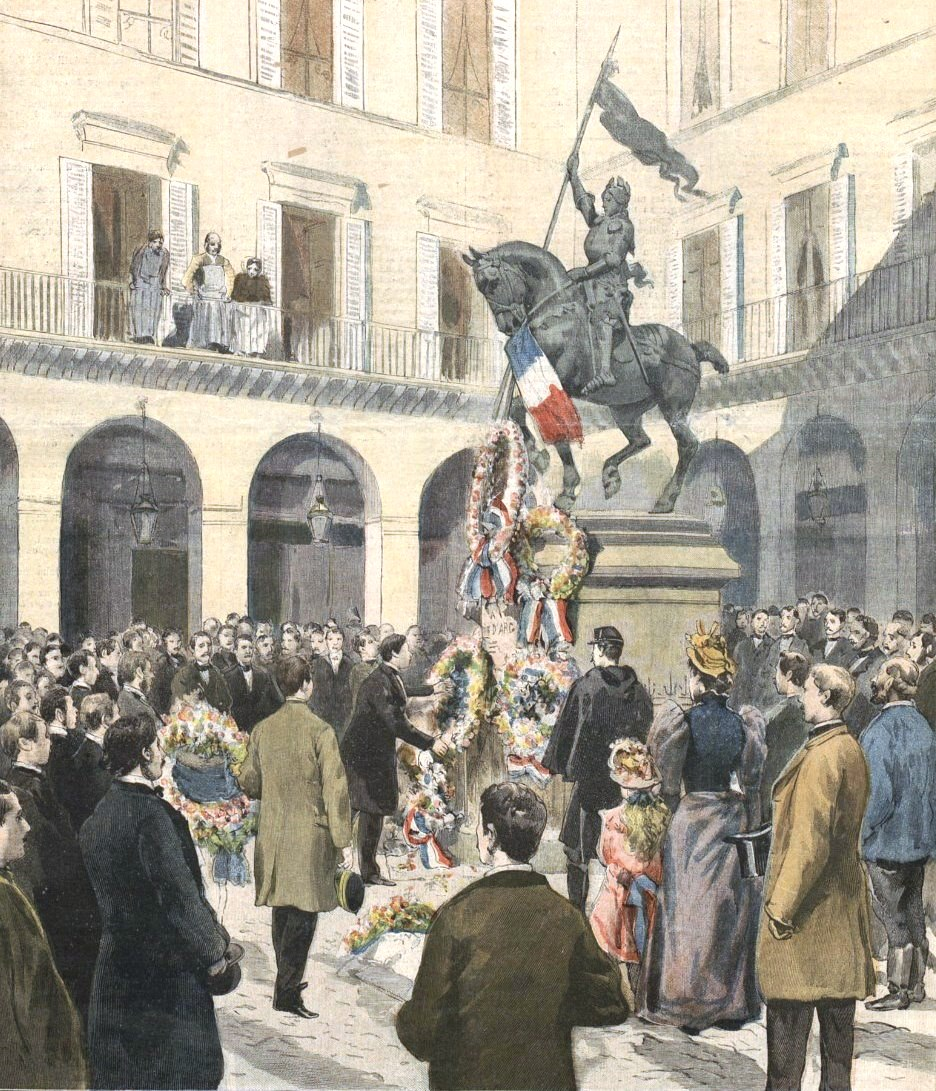
- Demonstration by Union nationale students at the Place des Pyramides statue on 4 February 1894
- Formation: September 1892
- Founder: Théodore Garnier
- Dissolved: Circa 1908
- Headquarters: Paris, France

The Union nationale was a political movement in late 19th-century France characterized by its Catholic, nationalist, anti-Masonic, and antisemitic ideologies.

== History ==
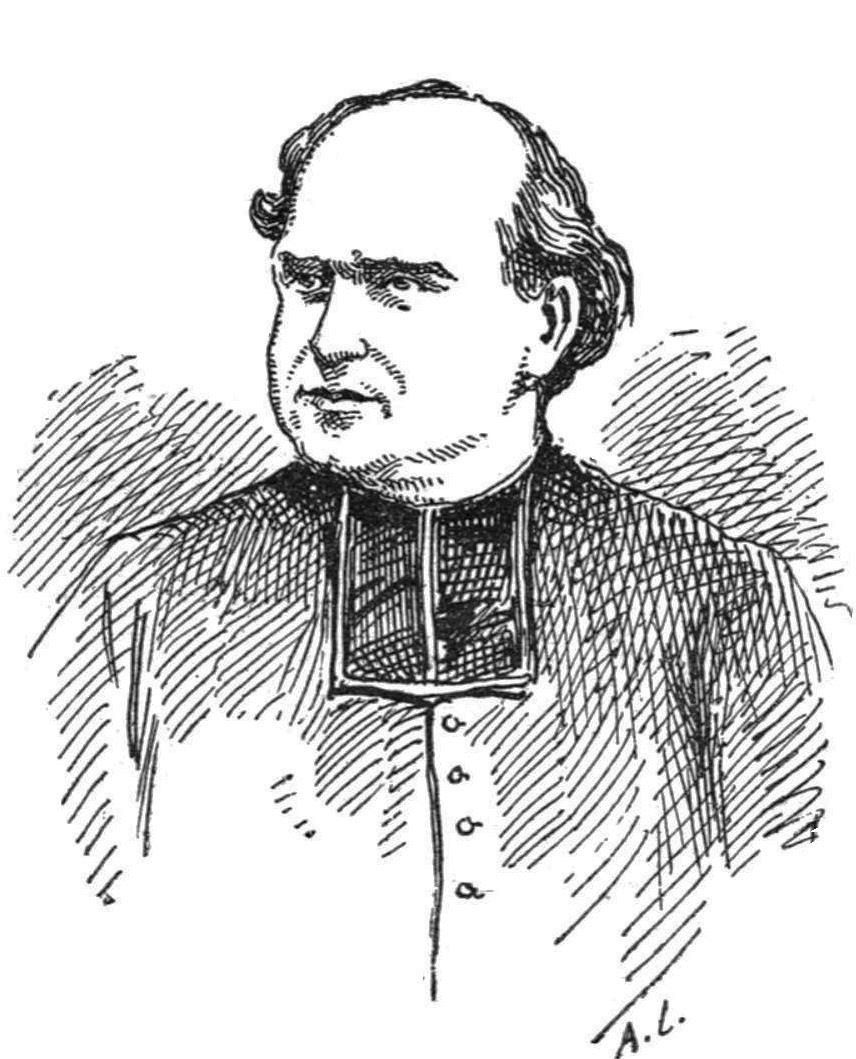
Abbé Théodore Garnier, founder and leader of Union nationale

The Union nationale was founded in September 1892 by Théodore Garnier at 5 Rue Bayard, in the premises of the printing press for the newspaper La Croix. It succeeded an earlier organization, the Action sociale catholique, which Garnier had created in 1888.

Influenced by the Ralliement policy promoted in the encyclical Au milieu des sollicitudes, the Union nationale endorsed the Republic, seeking to establish a "liberal republic." Its first public action was a petition against education laws in autumn 1892. Inspired by social Catholicism, the group proposed measures in support of workers and farmers while vehemently rejecting socialism in its collectivist and internationalist forms. The organization also became active in electoral politics during the 1893 elections.

On 4 February 1894, Union nationale organized one of the first patriotic demonstrations in honor of Joan of Arc at her equestrian statue on Place des Pyramides. In 1897, it laid a wreath at the Statue of Strasbourg in Place de la Concorde, adopting a tradition associated with the Ligue des patriotes. That same year, members began identifying as "nationalists."

With its newspaper Le Peuple français launched in December 1893 and a membership reportedly numbering as many as 100,000, the Union nationale established local committees in 18 Parisian districts and 35 provincial departments. Its national congress held in Lyon on 29–30 November 1896 marked the culmination of three other congresses on anti-Masonry, antisemitism, and social issues under the banner of "Christian democracy."

Despite its sincere republicanism, Union nationale accepted royalist funding and veered to the far-right during the Dreyfus Affair. It maintained a staunchly anti-Masonic stance and was deeply antisemitic, supporting organizations such as the Ligue antisémitique and the Jeunesse antisémitique. In 1896, it produced labels for storefronts of Jewish-owned businesses bearing inscriptions like: "Never buy from a Jew / France must belong to the French / French people, let's share one goal / Expel the Jews from the nation." Garnier also advocated xenophobia, proposing a tax on foreigners and the expulsion of those deemed "generally more the dregs than the cream of their countries."

The organization remained active until 1898 but declined from 1899 due to financial difficulties. In 1902, Garnier merged the group into Action libérale led by Jacques Piou. Union nationale gradually disappeared by around 1908.
