= Théodore Garnier =

French Catholic clergyman (1850–1920)

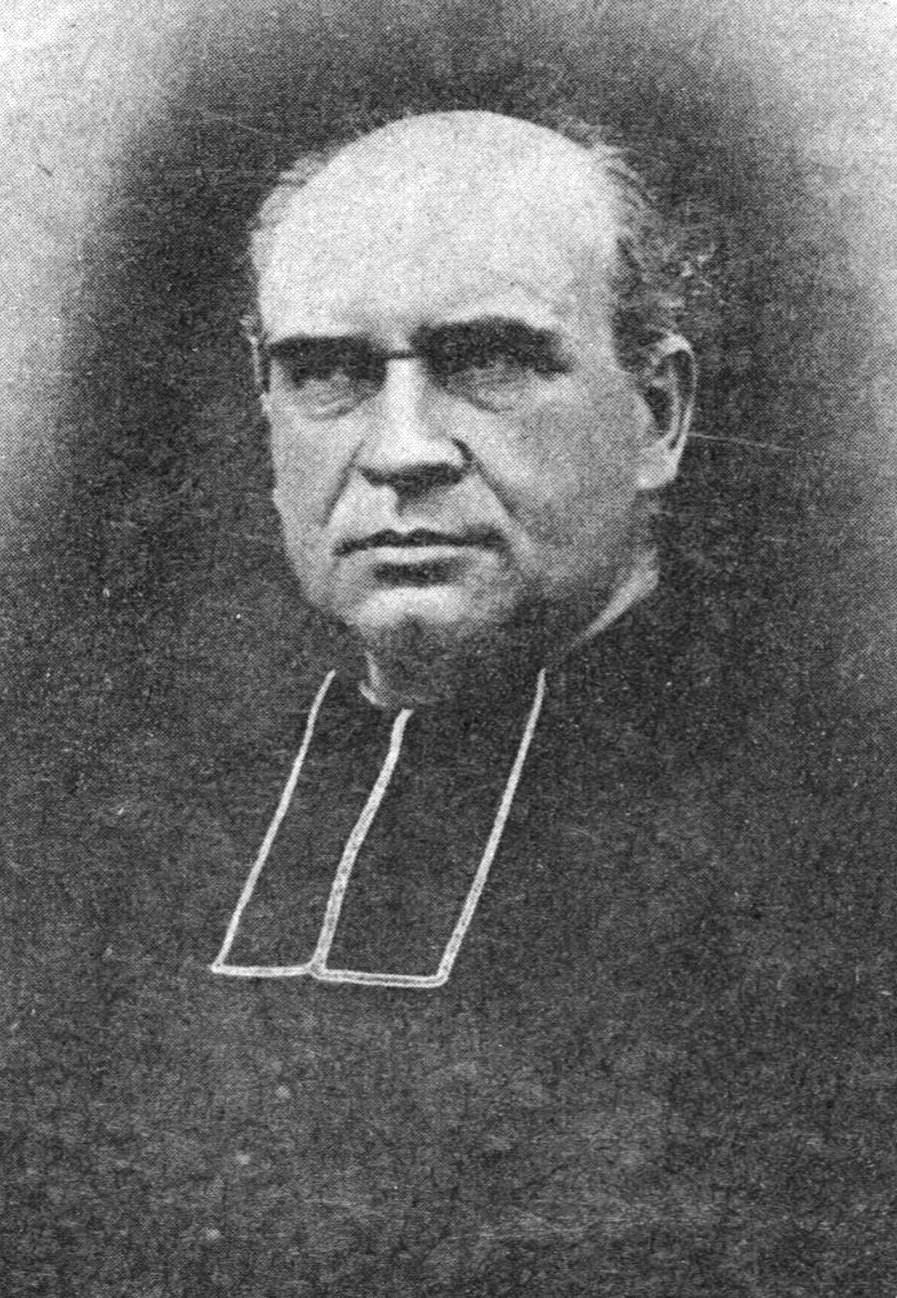
- Théodore Garnier as a Pontifical Zouave in 1870-71
- Born: 24 December 1850; Condé-sur-Noireau, France
- Died: 21 or 22 August 1920; Montmagny, France
- Occupations: Clergyman, activist, essayist
- Known for: Pioneer of Catholic social movements

Théodore Garnier, known as the "Abbé Garnier," (24 December 1850 – 21 or 22 August 1920) was a French Catholic clergyman, activist, and essayist. He is regarded as one of the pioneers of Catholic social teaching at the end of the 19th century.

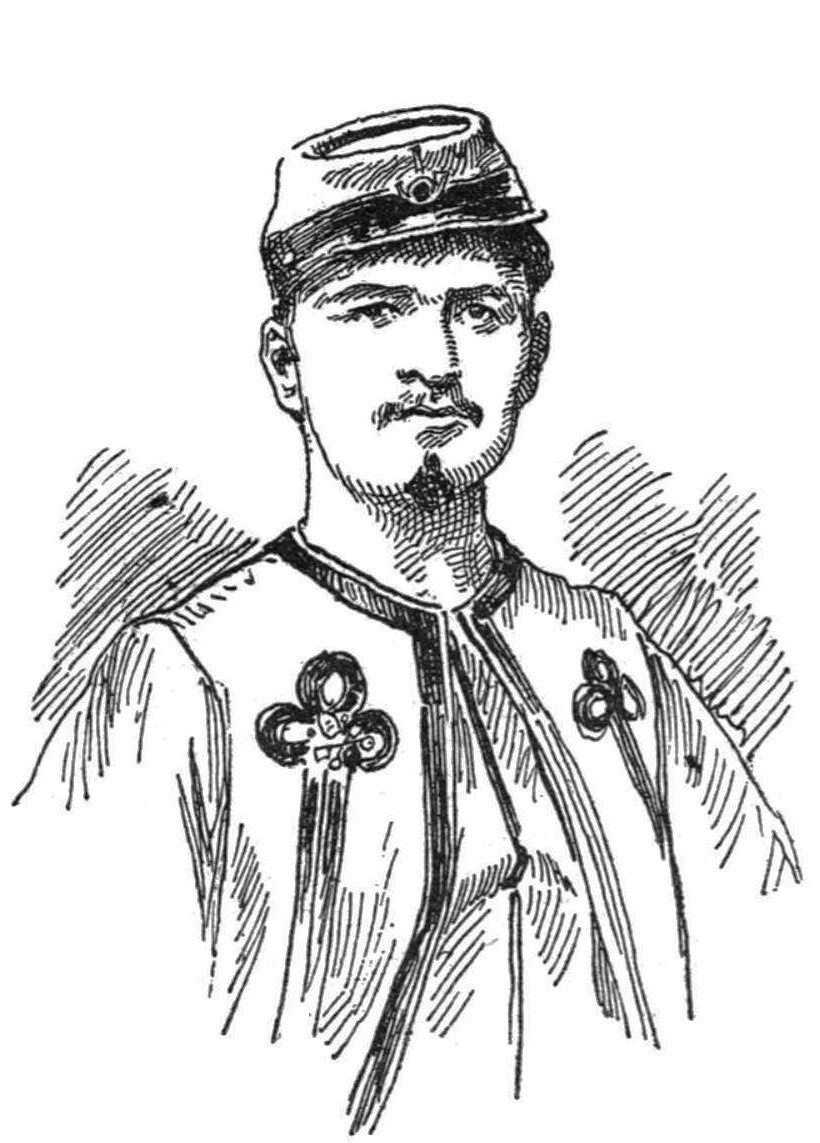
Théodore Garnier as a Pontifical Zouave in 1870–71.

Théodore Garnier was born to Marie-Rose Desert and Jean Garnier, a humble laborer in the hamlet of Champs-Saint-Martin in Condé-sur-Noireau. He had several siblings, including Léon Garnier, who also became a priest.

At a young age, Théodore Garnier participated in the Franco-Prussian War of 1870–71 as a Pontifical Zouave under General de Charette. Many years later, in 1912, he was awarded the commemorative medal for the war.

Ordained as a priest in 1874, Garnier served as vicar of the parish of Saint-Sauveur and chaplain of the Saint-Joseph boarding school in Caen. A talented and provocative preacher, he took the side of workers, founding a job placement office and a people's bank while advocating for a corporatist inspired Christian association of industry and trades. Appointed "apostolic missionary" by Pope Leo XIII, he focused on bridging the gap between the Catholic Church and the working class. His sermons attracted large audiences but also provoked disorder and clashes with anticlerical activists, such as the riot at the Rouen Cathedral in January 1888.

In 1888, he became a writer for the Catholic newspaper La Croix. Following the encyclical Au milieu des sollicitudes, he became a strong supporter of the Ralliement, advocating for Catholics to align with the Republic while promoting Christian socialism inspired by the encyclical Rerum Novarum. However, his progressive stances coexisted with antisemitic rhetoric.

In late July 1890, Pierre Martinet—an anarchist militant and founder of individualist anarchism—invited him to debate religion. Sébastien Faure joined Martinet in the discussion, though his remarks were less favorably received by the audience.

By 1897, Garnier began distancing himself from antisemitic movements.

Théodore Garnier founded several institutions, including the Union Nationale in 1892 and a Catholic workers' club near Notre-Dame de Clignancourt in Paris. His activism extended to political endeavors, where he ran for office multiple times but faced opposition from various sides.

During World War I, he served as a sergeant in the territorial army. Garnier died in Montmagny on 21 or 22 August 1920 and was buried in the local cemetery after a funeral presided over by his brother Léon Garnier.
