= Auguste, comte de La Ferronays =

French Minister of Foreign Affairs

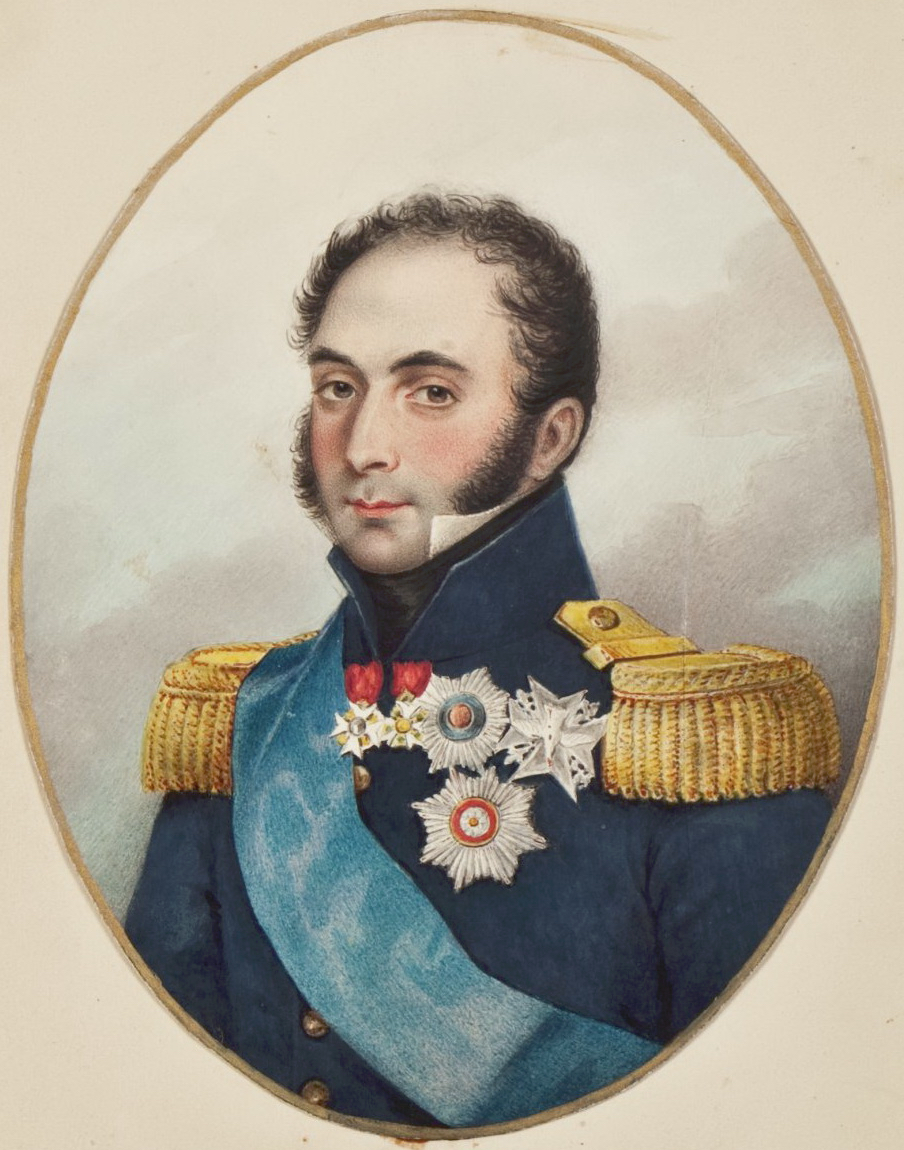

Pierre Louis Auguste Ferron, Count de La Ferronnays (1777–1842) was French Minister of Foreign Affairs from 4 January 1828 to 24 April 1829.

== Life ==
Born in Saint-Malo, he participated in the campaign of the army of Émigrés in 1792, then emigrated to England where he joined the Duke du Berry.

At the Bourbon Restoration, he was appointed brigadier, and peer of France in 1815.

He was Ambassador in Denmark (1817-1819) and Russia (1820-1827), before becoming foreign minister in the Martignac ministry in 1828, for a short time. During these years he maintained a friendly correspondence with Chateaubriand, that he briefly mentions in his memoirs.

He had children:

- Charles, General Counsel of the Oise, the then deputy mayor of Gers and Boury-en-Vexin for 12 years, who married the Countess of Lagrange;
- Pauline (1808–1891), by her marriage Mrs. Augustus Craven, novelist;
- Eugenie, by marriage Countess Adrien de Mun, mother of the speaker Albert de Mun.

He bought the castle Boury-en-Vexin, in 1835.

He was appointed a knight of the Order of the Holy Spirit in 1825 and died on 17 January 1842.

Political offices
Preceded by Ange Hyacinthe Maxence, baron de Damas	Foreign Minister of France; 4 January 1828 - 24 April 1829	Succeeded by Anne Pierre Adrien, duc de Montmorency-Laval
