= René de La Tour du Pin =

French politician and social reformer (1834–1924)

René de La Tour du Pin Marquis de la Charce
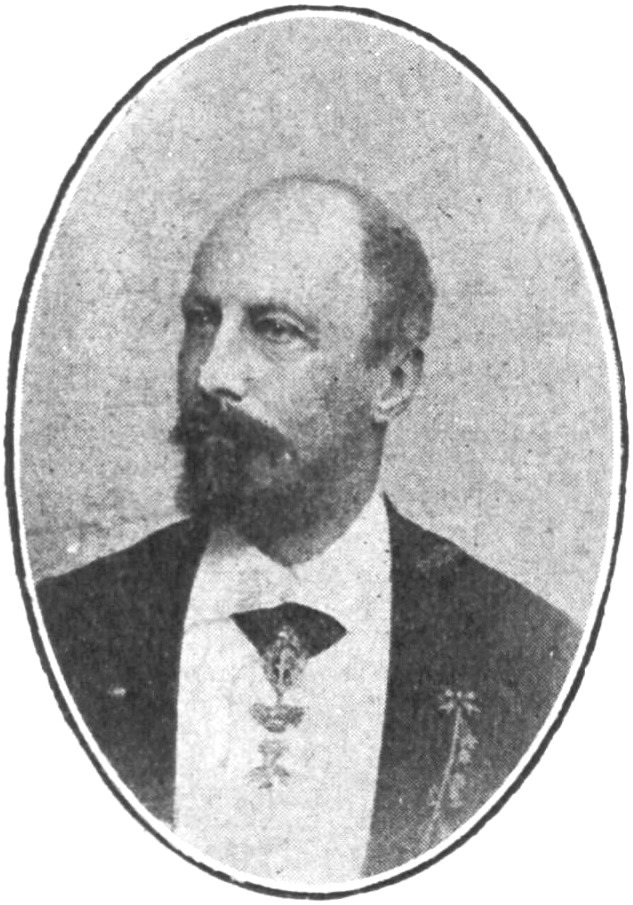
- Born: 1 April 1834; Arrancy, Kingdom of France
- Died: 4 December 1924 (aged 90); Lausanne, Switzerland
- Military career
- Allegiance: France
- Branch: French Army
- Service years: 1852–1881
- Rank: Lieutenant-Colonel (France)
- Conflicts: Crimean War, Risorgimento; Franco-Prussian War.

Charles-Humbert-René de La Tour du Pin Chambly de La Charce, (Note: In this French name, the surname is La Tour du Pin.) (April 1, 1834 – December 4, 1924), was a French military officer, politician and social reformer.

== Life ==
=== Early life ===
La Tour du Pin was born on April 1, 1834, in Arrancy, in the Picardy Region of France. He was the eldest son of Humbert de La Tour du Pin, Marquis de La Charce, and Charlotte Alexandrine de Maussion. He came from a long line of French aristocrats, with one of his direct ancestors fighting on crusade with Louis IX. La Tour du Pin was a descendant from an old noble dauphinoise family, which instilled a strong Catholic and Royalist identity in the young René.

La Tour du Pin's father instilled a spirit of noblesse oblige in the young boy, along with a deep care for his local community and the people that lived in it, especially its poorer members. This spirit of service to local community would later extend to a care for France as a whole.

In 1892, he married his cousin, Marie Séraphine de La Tour du Pin Montauban. The marriage never produced any children.

=== Military career ===
La Tour du Pin attended École Spéciale Militaire de Saint-Cyr in 1852. As a Junior Officer, he served the Second Empire in the Crimean War, in Second Italian War of Independence and the French Third Republic during the Franco-Prussian War.Taken prisoner at the surrender of Metz in October 1870, La Tour du Pin and Albert de Mun, met in a German prisoner of war camp at Aachen (Aix-la-Chapelle).

=== Publishing and Social Catholicism ===
After witnessing the unrest caused by the Paris Commune, La Tour du Pin and Mun were determined to respond to the dilemma of the working class. The following year they organized a Catholic Workers' club, under the name L'Oeuvre des Cercles Catholiques d'Ouvriers (Society of Catholic Worker Circles), at the request of Maurice Maignen (founder of the Brothers of St. Vincent de Paul). The clubs spread quickly throughout France. These "circles" or clubs brought together the wealthy and the workers from a given locale for prayer, socializing, and hearing lectures by members of the aristocracy. The organization hoped to prevent members of the working class from embracing revolutionary socialism. The clubs were organized based on a national committee and local circles. At the height of the organization's influence in 1881, L'Oeuvre had 550 local circles and reached a maximum membership of 50,000.

The movement provided a theoretical framework for Catholic politics in France, and was influenced by thinkers such as Louis de Bonald, Thomas Aquinas, Frédéric Le Play, and Émile Keller. In 1876, the group founded its own journal, Association Catholique, where members of the organization could present and publisher their work.

From 1877 to 1881, La Tour du Pin served as military attaché to Austria-Hungary, where he was influenced by Austrian Social Catholicism. While in Frohsdorf, he met exiled Henri, Count of Chambord, the Legitimist pretender to the French throne. In 1881, he resigned from the army and retired to Arrancy, where he became mayor.

In 1883, Henri's death left the Legitimist line of succession distinctly confused. On one hand, Henri himself had accepted that the head of the Maison de France (as distinguished from the Maison de Bourbon) would be the head of the Orléans line, (the Count of Paris). This was accepted by many Legitimists, and was the default on legal grounds; the only surviving Bourbon line more senior was the Spanish branch, which had renounced its right to inherit the throne of France as a condition of the Treaty of Utrecht. However, many if not most of Henri's supporters, including his widow, chose to disregard his statements and this law, arguing that no one had the right to deny to the senior direct-male-line male Bourbon to be the head of the Maison de France and thus the legitimate King of France; the renunciation of the Spanish branch is under this interpretation illegitimate and therefore void. Thus these Legitimists settled on Juan, Count of Montizón, the Carlist pretender to the Spanish throne (the Salic law having been suspended in Spain, the actual king, Alfonso XII, was not the senior descendant in the male line), as their claimant to the French crown. La Tour du Pin, along with other supporters of the Count of Chambord, prevented, Philippe d'Orleans (Count of Paris), from claiming the French Crown.

=== Monarchism and Later Life ===
In 1884, La Tour du Pin traveled to Fribourg, Switzerland for a series of conferences with leading Catholic intellectuals. The proceedings from these meetings would be one of the sources for Pope Leo XIII's encyclical Rerum novarum. In early 1885, while passing through Rome, La Tour du Pin was received by Pope Leo XIII to discuss Social Catholicism. In 1892, when Leo XIII issued his directive of "Ralliement" (or "rally to the republic", asking French Catholics to work within the French Third Republic), La Tour du Pin stayed true to his monarchist principles and would not accept the legitimacy of the republic.

In 1892, he met a young Charles Maurras and the two began a correspondence with each other that lasted until La Tour du Pin's death. When Maurras founded Action Française in 1899, La Tour du Pin assisted the movement and published three articles in the organization's journal of the same name: The Nobility, The Professional Representation, and Territorial Organization of France. In 1905 he formally joined Action Française, however he left the organization after the First World War due to Maurras's positivism; Maurras only saw the social utility of Catholicism, but did not necessarily believe it to be true. In 1907, La Tour du Pin published Towards a Christian Social Order. La Tour du Pin died in Lausanne, Switzerland, on December 4, 1924, at 90 years of age.

== Thought ==
Like Frédéric Le Play before him, La Tour du Pin held up the Christian Middle Ages as the great exemplar of social harmony and order between the classes. He called for "a return not to the form, but to the spirit of the institutions of the Middle Ages." He therefore called for a return of the medieval trade guilds and embraced the philosophy of corporatism where employers and employees who belong to the same profession or industry would cooperate via their own unions (or "corporations"). Like G. K. Chesterton, Hilaire Belloc, and the other Distributists, La Tour du Pin believed that property should be as widely distributed as possible, and he encouraged profit sharing programs to gives businesses an incentive to financially assist workers and give them a stake in the well-being of the corporation. However La Tour du Pin did not believe the problems plaguing the European working classes were simply material or financial issues, but also moral and spiritual ones as well; La Tour du Pin felt that only the restoration of the Christian family, increased solidarity between and among the classes, and renewed national unity would fix society. La Tour du Pin rejected both radical socialism and liberalism as products of the Enlightenment, and saw the restoration of intermediate institutions – institutions between the individual and the state – as the only way to ameliorate France's ills. He felt corporatism would simultaneously achieve the decentralization of power and the reduction of social atomization.

La Tour du Pin was likewise a committed Counter-Revolutionary and monarchist until his death, and refused Leo XIII's call to "rally to the republic."

== Published works ==
- Towards a Christian social order - Milestones road 1882–1907, Paris, New National Library, undated (1907), size 8vo, xii + 514 pages. This is a collection of articles published between 1882 and circumstance 1907 in various journals, mainly the Catholic Revival and French.

This book contains articles into five parts:

- I - Origins of a Program
- II - Social Economy
- III - Social Policy
- IV - Against the Foot of the Revolution
- V - The French Restoration

=== Writings in English Translation ===
- "On the Corporate Regime." In: Blum, Christopher O., editor and translator, Critics of the Enlightenment; pp. 195–215; (2003) ISI Books Wilmington, DE.; Second Ed.(2020) Cluny Media, Providence, RI.

== See also ==
- Social Catholicism
- Political catholicism
- Christian corporatism
- Christian democracy
- Albert de Mun
- École Polytechnique
- Encyclical Rerum novarum
- Liberal Catholicism
- Jacques Piou
- Marc Sangnier
- Le Sillon
