= Aimé, duc de Clermont-Tonnerre =

French general and statesman

Aimé-Marie-Gaspard, comte de Clermont-Tonnerre
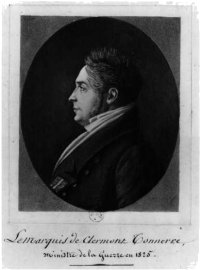
- Aimé de Clermont-Tonnerre
- Born: 27 November 1779; Paris, Kingdom of France
- Died: 8 January 1865 (aged 85); Glisolles, French Empire

Aimé-Marie-Gaspard, comte de Clermont-Tonnerre (27 November 1779 – 8 January 1865) was a French general and statesman.

Son of Gaspard-Paulin, vicomte de Clermont-Tonnerre and Anne-Marie- Louise Bernard de Boulainvilliers, and grandson of the Marquis de Boulainvilliers, Clermont-Tonnerre lived during the revolution with his grandfather.

== Life ==
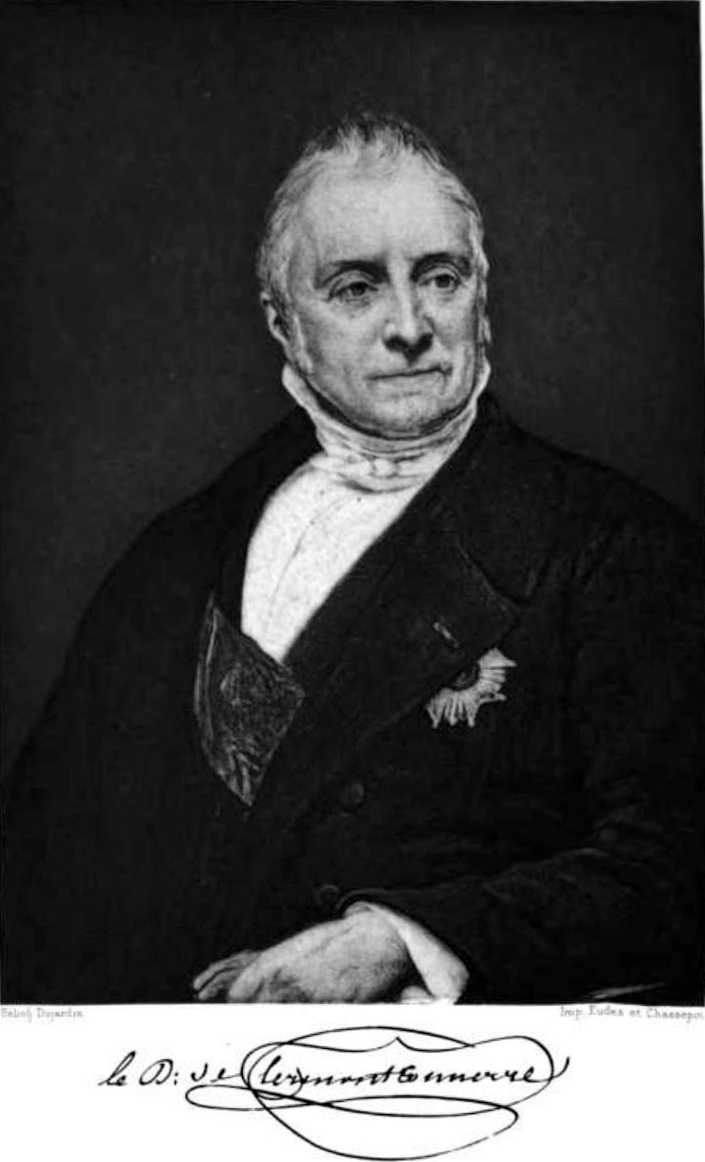
The Duke of Clermont-Tonnerre

He entered the École Polytechnique, before entering the army. He participated in the campaigns in Italy, Germany and Spain and was made adjudant of the King of Naples in 1808, in whose service he stayed afterwards. He married Charlotte de Cauvoisin and in 1814 returned to the French army as a colonel, was Maréchal de Camp and after the second return of the king, was made Peer of France and commander of the cavalry of the guard.

Clermont-Tonnerre sided with the moderate conservative party and was named Minister of the Navy and the Colonies in 1820 by Villèle. In 1823, he became Minister of War and assiduously reorganized the army.

Clermont-Tonnerre sent Hyacinthe de Bougainville around the world from 1824 to 1826 onboard Thétis and Espérance.

In 1827, he organized the Algerian expedition, which was executed in 1830.

After the revolution, he refused to swear allegiance to the new government of Louis-Philippe and retired into private life. In 1852, he lobbied for the first rail line between Paris and Cherbourg-en-Cotentin to pass through the department of Eure. He died on his estate in Glissolles.

The Hawaiian plant genus Clermontia was named in his honor by Charles Gaudichaud-Beaupré.

Political offices
Preceded by Ange Hyacinthe Maxence, baron de Damas	Minister of War; 4 August 1824 – 4 January 1828	Succeeded by Louis Victor de Blacquetot de Caux
