= Albert de Mun =

French political figure (1841–1914)

Adrien Albert Marie, Comte de Mun
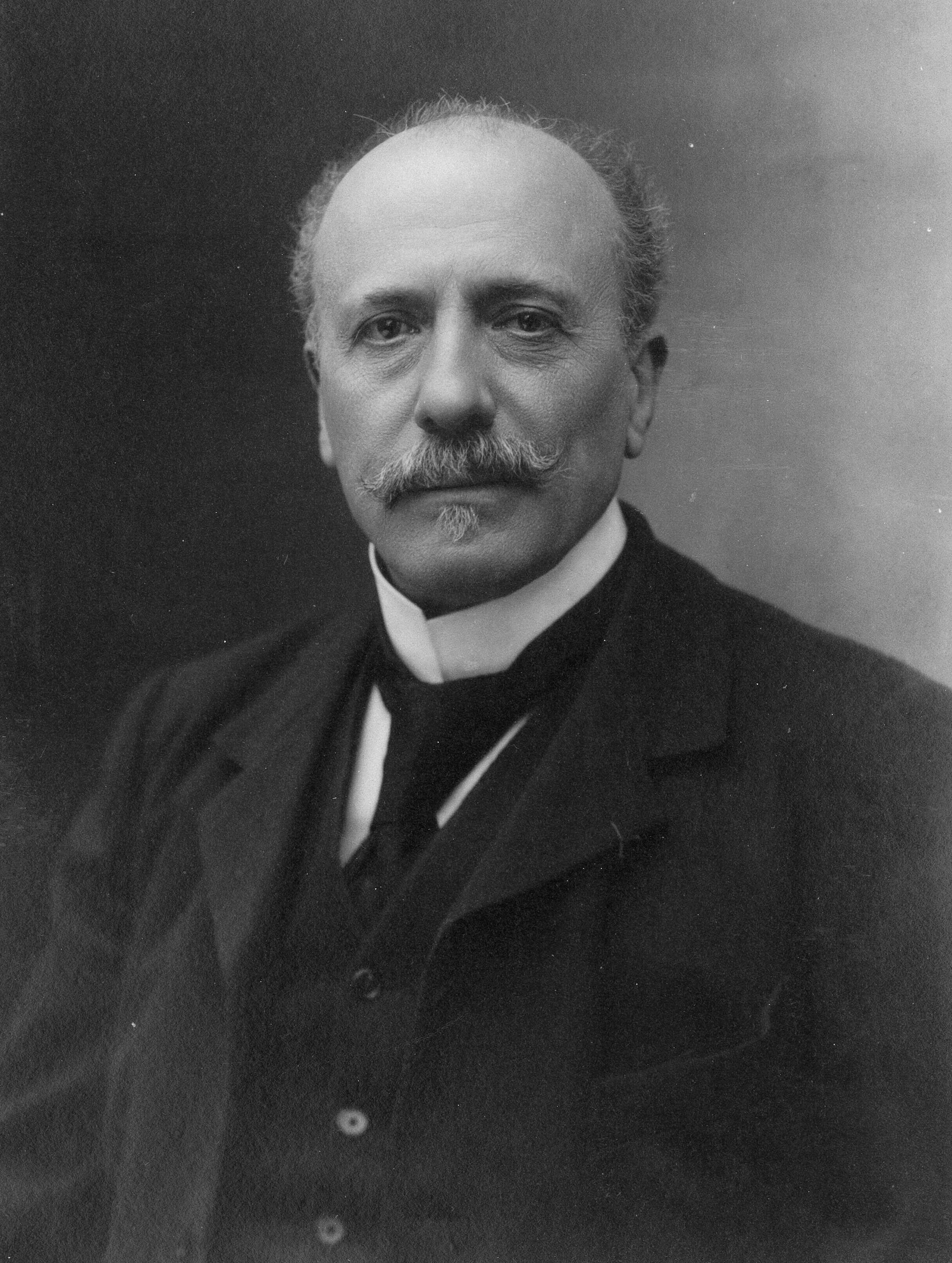
- Portrait by Nadar, c. 1890–1898

Personal details
- Born: February 28, 1841 Lumigny-Nesles-Ormeaux, Seine-et-Marne, Kingdom of France
- Died: 6 October 1914 (aged 73) Bordeaux, Third French Republic
- Party: Popular Liberal Action 1901-1914
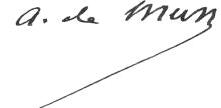
- Signature

Adrien Albert Marie, Comte de Mun (French pronunciation: [adʁjɛ̃ albɛʁ maʁi kɔ̃t də mœ̃], 28 February 1841 – 6 October 1914), was a French political figure, nobleman, journalist, and social reformer of the nineteenth century.

Born into a noble family de Mun joined the French army at a young age serving during the French conquest of Algeria, the Franco-Prussian War and the suppression of the Paris Commune. A devout Catholic, de Mun became interested in Catholic social teaching while he was a prisoner of war in Germany.

After this experience, de Mun dedicated himself to advancing the Church's teaching in French society and supporting the working class. De Mun's created a Catholic Workmen's association and later was elected to Chamber of Deputies. In the chamber de Mun was regarded as one its finest orators defending the Church, the army, and the lower classes.

As an advocate of social Catholicism de Mun was initially a Legitimist, before supporting the Third Republic following Pope Leo XIII's encyclical Au milieu des sollicitudes. De Mun was a key figure in the creation of France's modern labor laws during the Third Republic.

== Biography ==
=== Early years ===
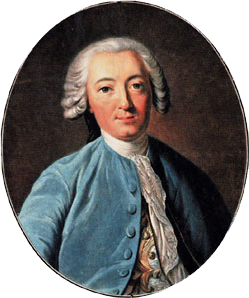
Materialist philosopher Helvétius. De Mun's paternal great-grandfather

Albert was born at Lumigny-Nesles-Ormeaux, Seine-et-Marne, son of the Marquis de Mun. He became a brother-in-law of the Duke of Ursel when his sister Antonine de Mun married him and left to live in Belgium. De Mun's great-grandfather was the philosopher Helvetius. His maternal grandfather was Auguste, comte de La Ferronays, foreign minister under Charles X. His aunt was the writer Pauline Marie Armande Craven.

He entered the French Army, saw service in Algeria (1862). In 1869 he received his lieutenant commission from Prince Imperial Louis-Napoléon. In 1870 he took part in the fighting around Metz (during the Franco-Prussian War). On the surrender of Metz, he was sent as a prisoner of war to Aachen (Aix-la-Chapelle), where he met René de La Tour du Pin. While in Germany he became aware of and inspired by work the social teachings of Bishop Wilhelm Emmanuel von Ketteler. De Man and du Pin became determined to respond to the dilemmas of the working class upon their release from prison.

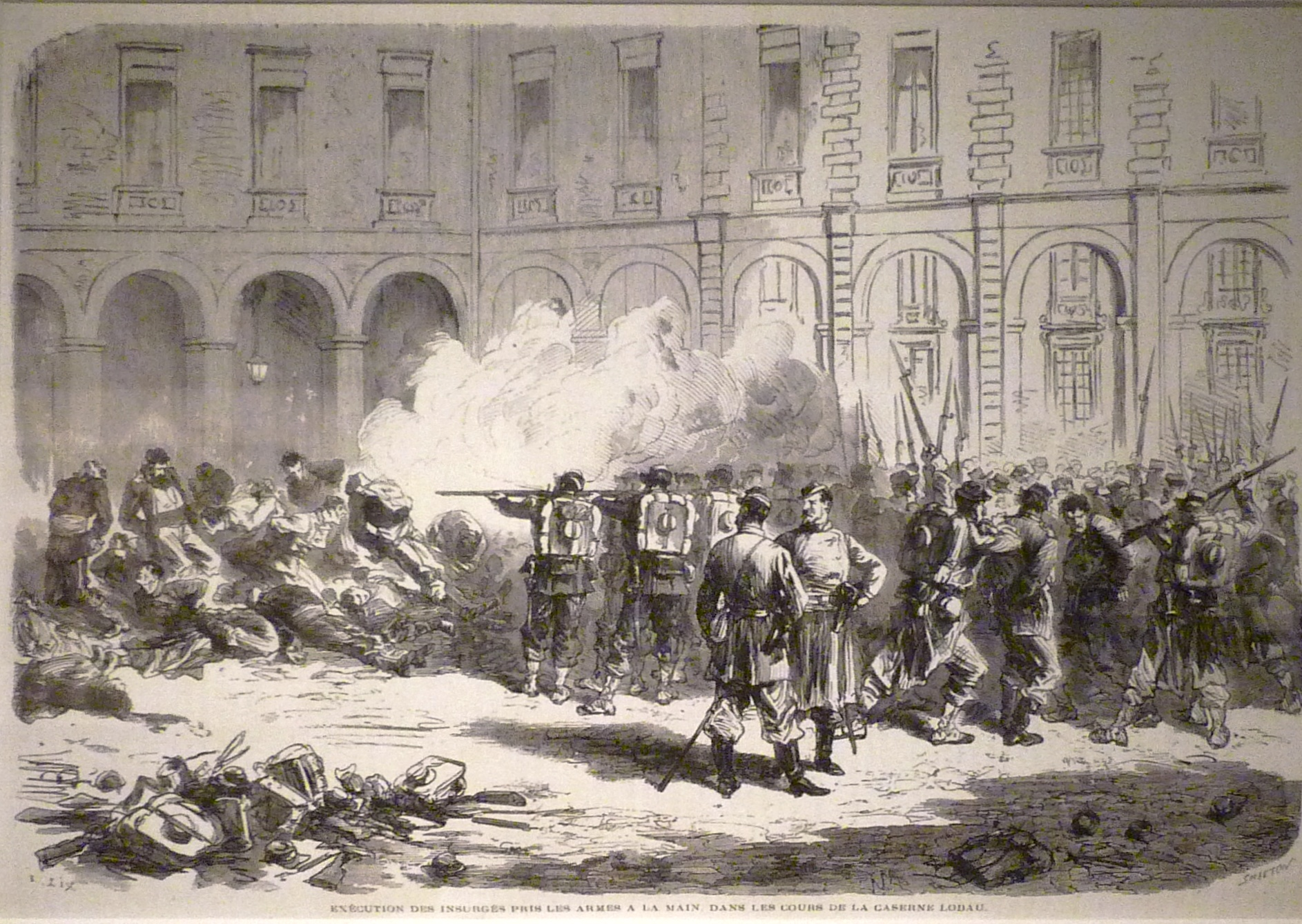
Mass execution of Communard prisoners in the Lobau barracks, engraving by Frédéric Lix. The suppression of the Commune had a profound impact on de Mun.

After the war he took part in the suppression of the Paris Commune serving on the staff of General Paul de Ladmirault. During the suppression de Mun was appalled by the violence of both forces, impressed by the fervor of the communards, and angered by the indifference of the upper classes to the problems of the working class. Testifying at a parliamentary investigation into the origins of the Commune the Count said:

The evil from which our society suffers derives from two causes. On the one hand there is a profound hatred of the upper classes by the working class, and on the other a complete apathy among the bourgeoisie for the welfare of the workers and a complete lack of ability on their part to distinguish error from truth. Between the classes there is today a profound abyss that can be filled only by time and by a better moral education. I do not believe that force alone can bring about any amelioration.

The following year he and du Pin organized a Catholic Workers' club, under the name "L'Oeuvre des Cercles Catholiques d'Ouvriers" (Society of Catholic Worker Circles), at the request of Maurice Maignen (founder of the Brothers of St. Vincent de Paul). The clubs spread quickly throughout France. These "circles" or clubs brought together the wealthy and the workers from a given locale for prayer, socializing and lectures by members of the aristocracy.

=== Politics ===
==== Legitimist in the Republic ====
A fervent Roman Catholic, Albert devoted himself to advocating Social Catholicism. His attacks on Third French Republic's social policy ultimately gave rise to a prohibition from the Minister of War. He thereupon resigned his commission (November 1875) and in the following February stood as Royalist and Catholic candidate for Pontivy. The influence of the Church was exerted to secure his election and, during the proceedings, he was awarded the Order of Saint Gregory the Great by Pope Pius IX. He won the next elections for the same constituency, but the result was declared invalid. De Mun was re-elected however in the following August and for many years was the most conspicuous leader of the anti-Republican party. "We form", he said on one occasion, "the irreconcilable Counter-Revolution".

In March 1876 de Mun delivered his maiden speech in the French assembly. Within a few weeks de Mun established himself as the leading defender of the Church and earning the respect of the anti-clericals with his oratory and strong personality. Soon after de Mun was being called the "Gambetta of the Right" with Gambetta himself praising the young man as another Montalembert.

In 1878, he had declared himself opposed to universal suffrage, a declaration that lost him his seat from 1879 to 1881. For much of his career de Mun was a committed Legitimist. The Legitimist pretender to the French throne, Henri, Count of Chambord, was godfather to one of the de Mun's children. He spoke strongly against the exile of the French princes (after the Count of Paris gave rise to suspicions that he was preparing to claim the throne), and it was chiefly through his influence that the support of the Royalist party was given to Georges Boulanger.

==== Ralliement ====
As a faithful Catholic, he obeyed the encyclical of 1892, Au milieu des sollicitudes, and declared his readiness to rally to a republican government, provided that it respected religion. In the following January, he received from Leo XIII a letter commending his actions and encouraging him in his social reforms. De Mun's embrace of the Republic led to a break with his old friend Édouard Drumont. In Durmont's newspaper La Libre Parole the count and Papal Nuncio Cardinal Domenico Ferrata were denounced liked common criminals.

He was defeated at the general election of that year, but in 1894 was elected in Finistère (Morlaix). In 1897, he succeeded Jules Simon as a member of the Académie française, owing to the quality and eloquence of his speeches which, with a few pamphlets, form the bulk of his published work. In Ma vocation sociale (1908) he wrote an explanation and justification of his career.

He was also a resolute opponent of Socialism: "Socialism is logical Revolution and we are Counter-Revolution. There is nothing in common between us." Despite this stance Du Mon occasionally found common ground with the French Workers' Party who praised his 'integrity and idealism". In his inaugural parliamentary speech Paul Lafargue, Karl Marx's son in law, praised the Count for having "delivered the best socialist speech ever given in this chamber." Some anti-clerical leftists even suspected an alliance between the POF and the Social Catholic movement.

The social reform de Mun supported included:

- Limiting the working week to 58 hours with all Sundays off
- Banning night work for women
- Four weeks of breaks for women after childbirth
- Abolition of child labor
- Old age pensions
- Accident and Health insurance
- Minimum wages for sweatshops
- Joint arbitration councils
- International agreements on labor legislation.

In 1883 the de Mun spoke in favor of the bill to legalize trade unions in France.

==== Dreyfus affair ====
The issue of Alfred Dreyfus first came to de Mun's attention in May 1897 when Alfred's brother, Matthieu Dreyfus, appeared at the Count's door to ask for help in reversing his brother's court-martial. De Mun was the first person Matthieu went to due his respect for the army and his support for the downtrodden. However, the Count was extremely loyal to the army high command and refused to entertain the idea that they were wrong. The conversation ended with de Mun telling Matthieu "I have nothing to say to you on the subject.

This loyalty to the army made de Mun one of the leading Anti-Dreyfusard. This was reinforced by his antisemitism believing the Jews were plotting an international conspiracy and casually referred to them as youtres (French equivalent of "kikes").

=== Later years ===
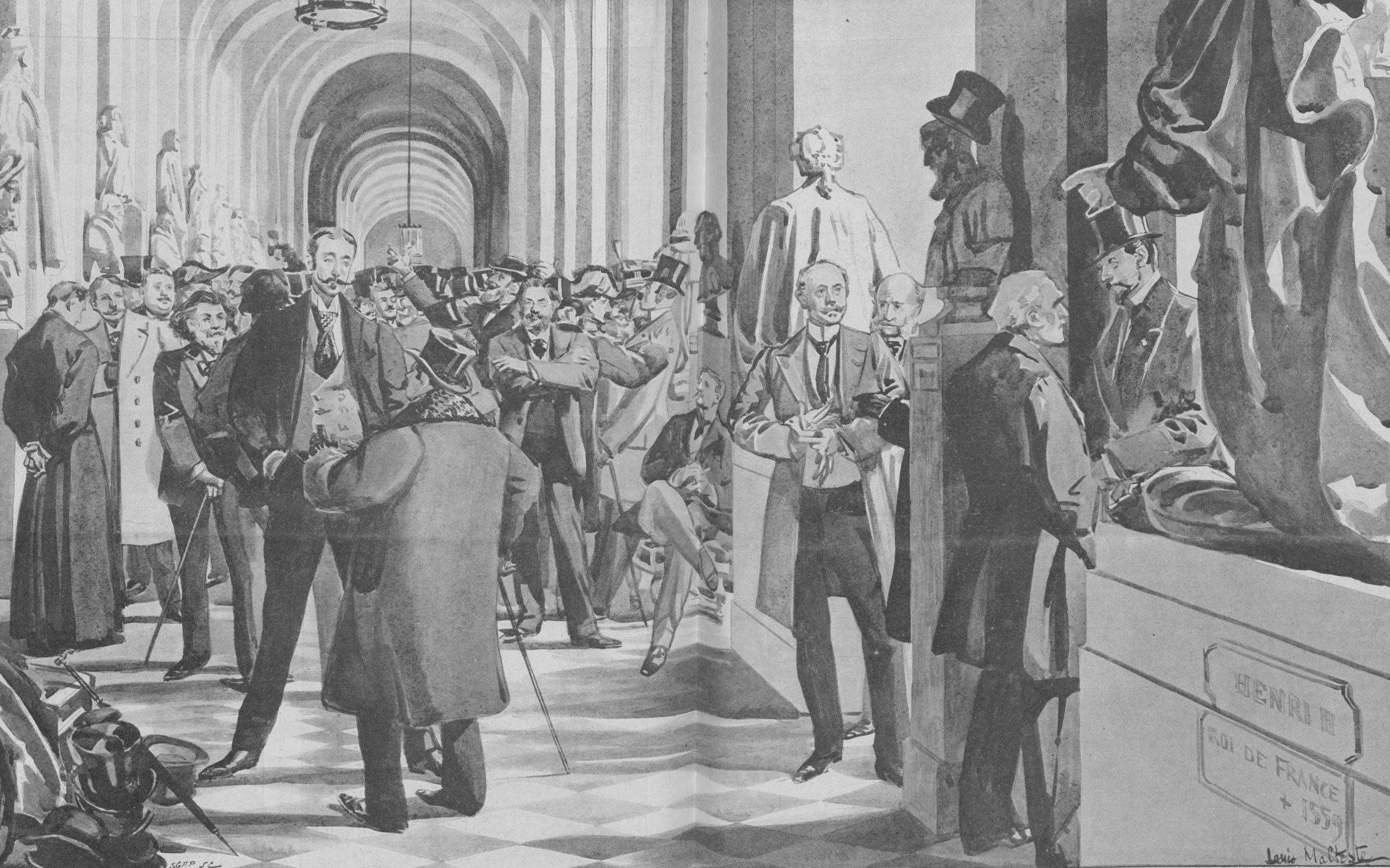
A political cartoon from Le Monde depicting a meeting at Versailles. De Mun is fourth from the right.

In 1896 de Mun denounced the Hamidian massacres against the Armenians by the Ottoman Empire. The Count's denouement led him to make common cause with his political rivals Jean Jaurès and Georges Clemenceau, along with the Republican historian Ernest Lavisse. In order to form a united front against the anti-clericals between French Catholics de Mun and Jacques Piou formed the Popular Liberal Action party in 1901. Despite ideological and religious differences de Mun was good friends with Prime Minister Louis Barthou.

==== The Great War ====
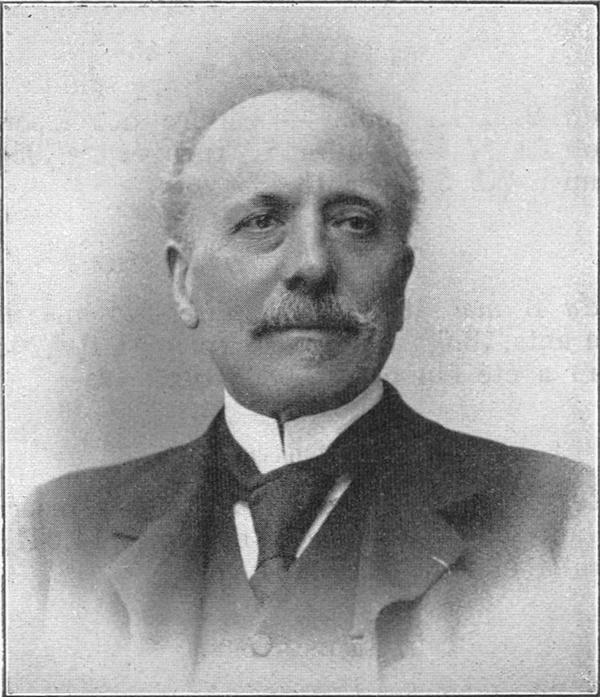
The Count in his later years.

Since 1911, de Mun had predicted a coming war against the Triple Alliance with the Balkans being the source of the outbreak. However, exhausted by his work, the last election, and his illness, de Mun was dismissive of the significance of the assassination of Archduke Franz Ferdinand in 1914. By the end of July de Mun was convinced that war was upon the nation, but confident that no Frenchman would hesitate in their duty.

Despite their often-bitter political differences de Mun condemned the Assassination of Jean Jaurès sending a "touching" letter to his widow expressing his condolences. Biographer Benjamin Martin described this as the first step in the formation of the Sacred Union during the First World War. In further support of the Union, after the French chamber voted for war, de Mun crossed the chamber and grasped the hand of socialist Édouard Vaillant, a former communard, who had never before spoken to the former cavalry officer who had taken part in the suppression of the Commune.

Outside the chamber another of de Mun's former enemies Théophile Delcassé, who had engineered France's break with the Vatican, was receiving congratulations for success in forging the Entente Cordiale. Upon seeing de Mun among the crowd Delcassé leaned in and asked "And will God be with us too?" to which, de Mun replied "Yes you may rest easy. God forgives, and he takes into account the sacrifices of Catholics. He will grant their prayers."

During the fighting in Morocco de Mun has lobbied for the restoration of army chaplains. In May 1913 War Minister Eugène Étienne decreed that 4 chapins could be assigned to each army corp. This number was entirely insufficient for the fighting on the Western Front and the troops demanded more. Prime Minister René Viviani responded by authorizing de Mun to recruit 250 priests for service, but without pay and for an indefinite length. De Mun was given an office at the French Red Cross headquarters in Paris. By August 27 the first chaplains' corps ready and sent to the front with a thousand more priests waiting for the next round of army formations. All expenses were paid by subscriptions to de Mun's paper, L'Echo de Paris, amounting to more than one hundred thousand francs.

At the end of August Poincare urged Viviani to broaden his ministry by bringing in Aristide Briand, Alexandre Millerand, and de Mun. Viviani accepted the first two, but not de Mun. Millerand, with the prime minister's support, instead appointed de Mun to oversee the army's supply system. De Mun, who was disappointed that his age and health prevented him from rejoining the fight was thrilled by the decision for it allowed him to work directly with the army again. In any case the position effectively made de Mun an unofficial minister. Furthermore, his daily wartime editorials significantly improved morale with the War ministry flooded with messages from soldiers and citizens praising the Count's writings. This led the nation to call him the "Minister of Public Confidence".

Confident in the ultimate victory of General Joffre, de Mun had to be ordered by President Poincare to leave Paris with the rest of the government for Bordeaux. On October 6th after celebrating Joffre's counteroffensive and finishing his next editorial de Mun passed away.

== Legacy ==
Upon his death Edmond Rostand told his widow "Madam, the souls of the France crowd around your heart." Pope Benedict XV sent his condolences to the funeral.

De Mun's funeral took place on October 10th at Notre Dame de Bordeaux and presided over by Archbishop Pierre Andrieu. In an extraordinary break with precedent President Raymond Poincaré, Prime Minister René Viviani, Delcassé, and the majority of deputies and senators attended the service. At the cemetery Paul Deschanel, speaker of the chamber, in his eulogy called the count "the immortal honor of France". During the address Poincaré was openly weeping and embraced Deschanel after he finished speaking. Another one by Piou concluded with "He spent his life defending the unpopular, but he died the most popular man in France."

Prime Minister Louis Barthou said that the count was "the collaborator and even sometimes the precursor of all the great labor laws of the Republic." Charles De Gaulle was influenced by the Count's political views. American historian Barbara Tuchman called him a "sincere and honorable man of lofty ideals"

== See also ==
- Catholic Social Teaching
- Rerum novarum
- René de La Tour du Pin
- Jacques Piou
- Popular Liberal Action
