= Ange Hyacinthe Maxence, baron de Damas =

French military officer and statesman (1785–1862)

Ange Hyacinthe Maxence de Damas de Cormaillon Baron de Damas
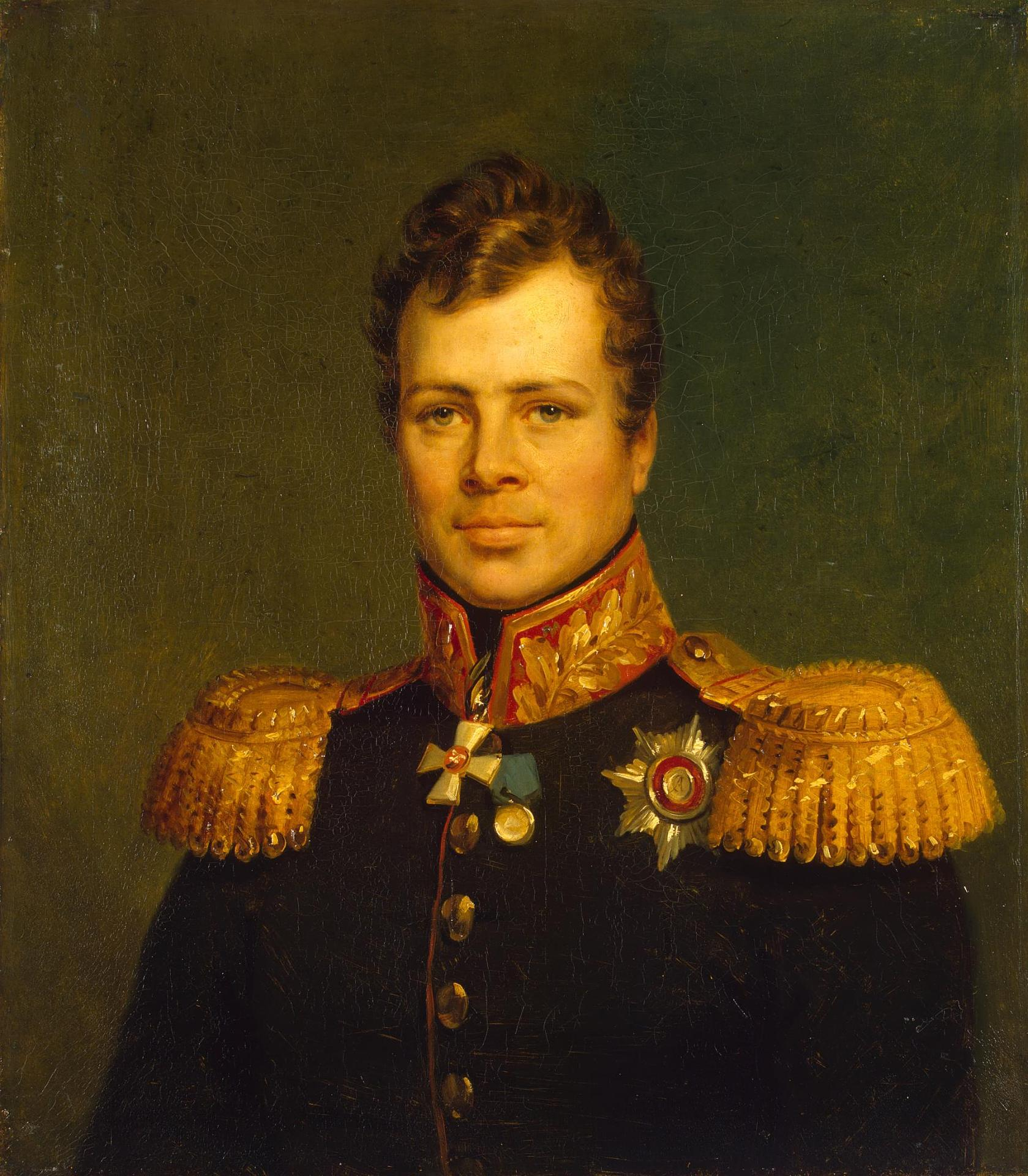
- Portrait by George Dawe in the Military Gallery of the Winter Palace

French Minister of Foreign Affairs
- In office 4 August 1824 – 4 January 1828
- Preceded by: François-René de Chateaubriand
- Succeeded by: Auguste, comte de La Ferronays

French Minister of War
- In office 19 October 1823 – 4 August 1824
- Preceded by: Claude Victor, duc de Bellune
- Succeeded by: Aimé, duc de Clermont-Tonnerre

Personal details
- Born: 30 September 1785 Paris, France
- Died: 6 May 1862 (age 76) Paris, France

Military service
- Allegiance: Russian Empire; Kingdom of France
- Branch/service: Army
- Years of service: 1800–1823
- Rank: Lieutenant General
- Wars: War of the Fourth Coalition; Patriotic War of 1812; War of the Sixth Coalition
- Awards: Legion of Honour; Order of St. George; Order of Saint Alexander Nevsky; Order of Saint Vladimir; Gold Sword for Bravery; Order of Saint Anna; Order of Saint Joseph; Order of Saints Maurice and Lazarus; Order of the Crown; Royal Order of the Two-Sicilies; Laureate Cross of Saint Ferdinand; Order of Charles III; Military Order of Saint James of the Sword; Order of Saint Stephen of Hungary; Order of Saint Louis

Ange Hyacinthe Maxence de Damas de Cormaillon, baron de Damas (30 September 1785 – 6 May 1862), was a French general and statesman who participated in the Napoleonic Wars on the Russian side before returning to France after Napoleon's exile. Upon his return to France, he continued his military career and entered into politics, eventually becoming the Minister of War and the Minister of Foreign Affairs under the Capetian kings.

== Early life ==
After his father Charles's death at Quiberon, Maxence de Damas, maternally a great-grandson of the Irish war hero General Sarsfield, was led by his uncle the Duke of Richelieu, who presented him to Czar Paul I to join the military cadet school in Saint Petersburg.

He began a distinguished military career in the service of Czar Alexander. He participated in the European campaigns against the armies of Napoleon and entered Paris. At the request of Louis XVIII, Maxence de Damas began a new military career in France.

== Military and political career in France ==
He was appointed lieutenant general in 1815 and given command of the 8th division Marseille. After having pacified the South, he commanded the 9th Division in Spain, he received the surrender of Figuières. He was made a Peer of France in 1823.

He became Minister of War in 1823, designed the Act of 1824, which emphasized commitment to the number, competence through training and length of service. In 1824, the king asked him to replace François-René de Chateaubriand as Minister of Foreign Affairs. He managed to solve the crisis in Spain and Portugal, and Greece with the Ottoman Empire, and ordered an archaeological expedition on the Euphrates, which will update the City of Ur and the splendors of Khorsabad. He negotiated with the Republic of Santo Domingo for compensation of the French.

From 1828 he tutored the Duke of Bordeaux (future "Henry V"). After the July Revolution (1830), he accompanied the Dauphin and Charles X into exile.

By his marriage with Charlotte Laure de Hautefort, daughter of Julie Alix de Choiseul-Praslin, he became owner of the Château de Sainte-Suzanne (Mayenne) 10 May 1822; he sold the château on 30 December 1855.

== Later life ==
The baron de Damas returned to France in 1833 and retired to his wife's castle, Hautefort. He began his ultimate career dedicated to social works, manager of the hospice Hautefort, creating the first local "social security", promoting agriculture through the introduction of a loan of honor, and writing his memoirs.

Baron de Damas (born in Paris 30 September 1785, died in Paris 6 May 1862, Lieutenant General in 1815, even of France in 1823, Minister of Foreign Affairs from 1824 to 1828, governor of the Duke of Bordeaux in 1828, an exile with Charles X in 1830, then retired to Hautefort in 1833, where he wrote his memoirs), and the body of his wife, born Sigismonde Charlotte Laure de Hautefort (born in Paris 2 July 1799, died 10 September 1847, daughter of Amédée Louis Frédéric, comte de Hautefort, and of Julie Alix de Choiseul-Praslin)

== Works ==
- Ange-Hyacinthe de Damas, Mémoires du baron de Damas (1785–1862), publiées par son petit-fils Comte de Damas, Paris, 1922 (réédition : Phénix Editions, 2005 ISBN 2-7458-1444-3)
- Petr Zaborov, « "Ja Rossii i russkih ne zabyvaju" Dvadcat' pjat' pisem barona de Dama k semejstvu Oleninyh », dans Cahiers du monde russe, no 39/3 (1998)

Political offices
Preceded by Claude Victor, duc de Bellune	Minister of War; 19 October 1823 – 4 August 1824	Succeeded by Aimé, duc de Clermont-Tonnerre
Preceded by François-René de Chateaubriand	Minister of Foreign Affairs; 4 August 1824 – 4 January 1828	Succeeded by Auguste, comte de La Ferronays
