= Arrancy =

- Commune
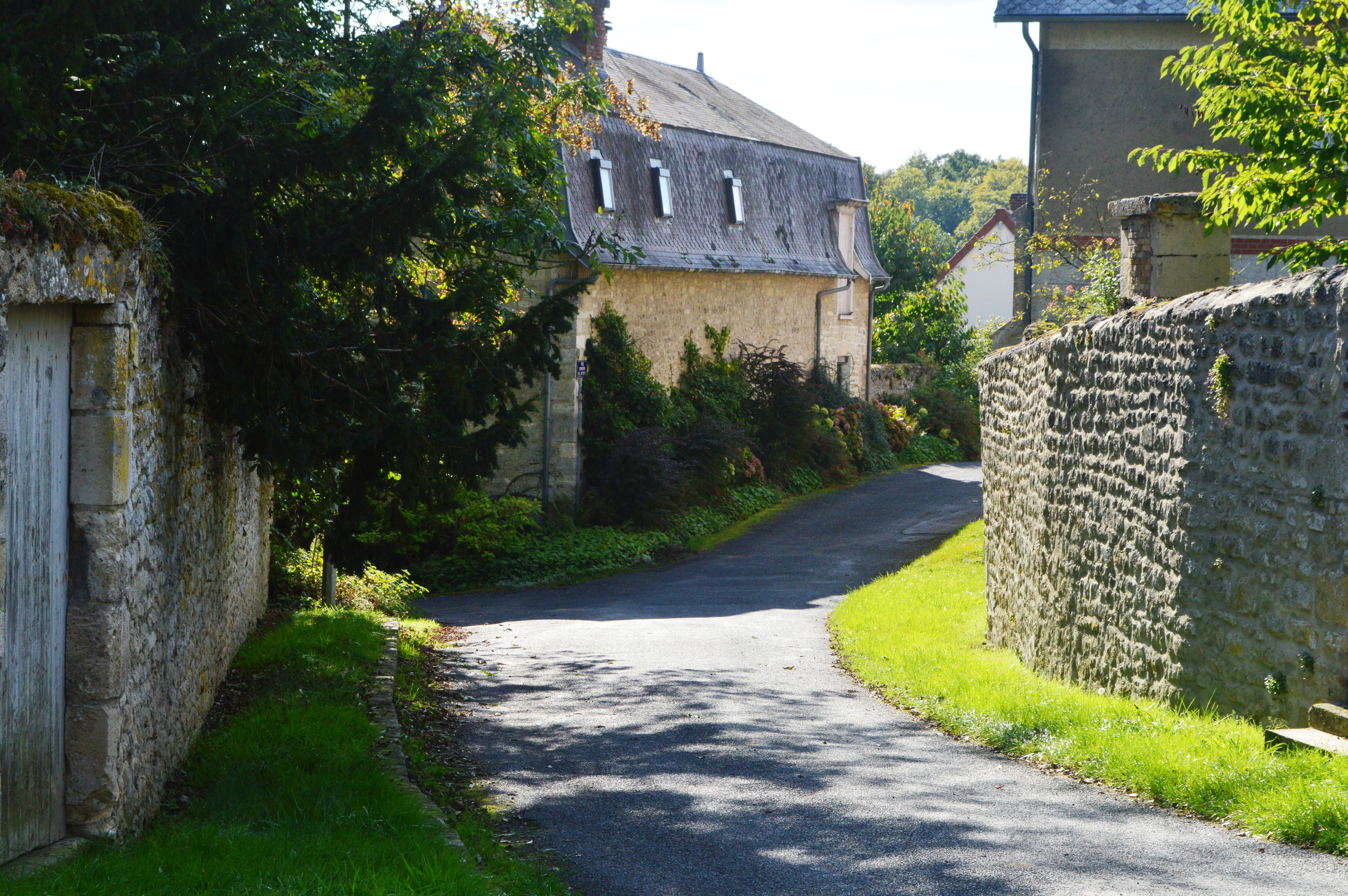
- Location of Arrancy
- Location within France Location within Hauts-de-France
- Coordinates: 49°29′34″N 3°45′19″E
- Country: France
- Region: Hauts-de-France
- Department: Aisne
- Arrondissement: Laon
- Canton: Laon-2
- Intercommunality: CA Pays de Laon

Government
  - Mayor (2026–32): Jean-Noël Paris
- Area^{1}: 5.57 km^{2} (2.15 sq mi)
- Elevation: 120 m (390 ft)
- Highest elevation: 209 m (686 ft)
- Lowest elevation: 100 m (330 ft)
- Population (2023): 45
  - Density: 8.1/km^{2} (21/sq mi)
- Time zone: UTC+01:00 (CET)
  - Summer (DST): UTC+02:00 (CEST)
- INSEE/Postal code: 02024 /02860
- ^{1} French Land Register data, which excludes lakes, ponds, glaciers > 1 km^{2} (0.386 sq mi or 247 acres) and river estuaries.

Arrancy (French pronunciation: [aʁɑ̃si]) is a commune in the department of Aisne in the Hauts-de-France region of northern France.

== Geography ==
Arrancy is located some 15 km southeast of Laon and 40 km northwest of Reims. It can be accessed by the D1044 road from Festieux in the north which passes down the eastern edge of the commune and continues south to Corbeny. The village is accessed by the D88 which runs west from the D1044 to the village then continues west to Ployart-et-Vaurseine. There are also some country roads which access the commune. The commune is mixed farmland and forest with no other hamlets or villages other than Arrancy.

La Bièvre stream rises northeast of the village and flows southwest to the south of the village then west into the Ailette Lake.

== Population ==
Historical population
Year	Pop.	±% p.a.
1968	66	—
1975	56	−2.32%
1982	53	−0.78%
1990	42	−2.87%
1999	50	+1.96%
2007	47	−0.77%
2012	54	+2.82%
2017	53	−0.37%
2023	45	−2.69%
Source: INSEE

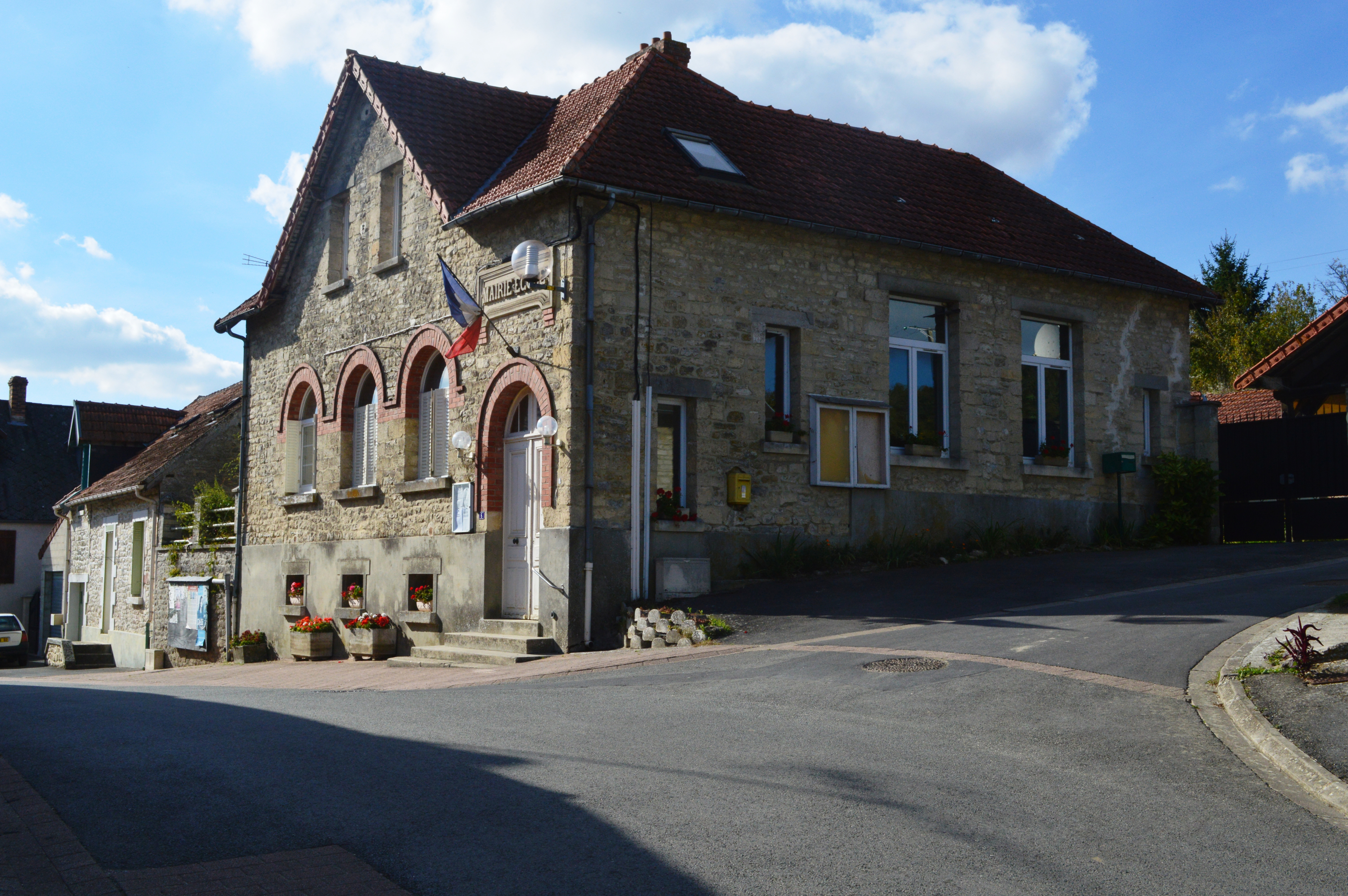
The Town Hall

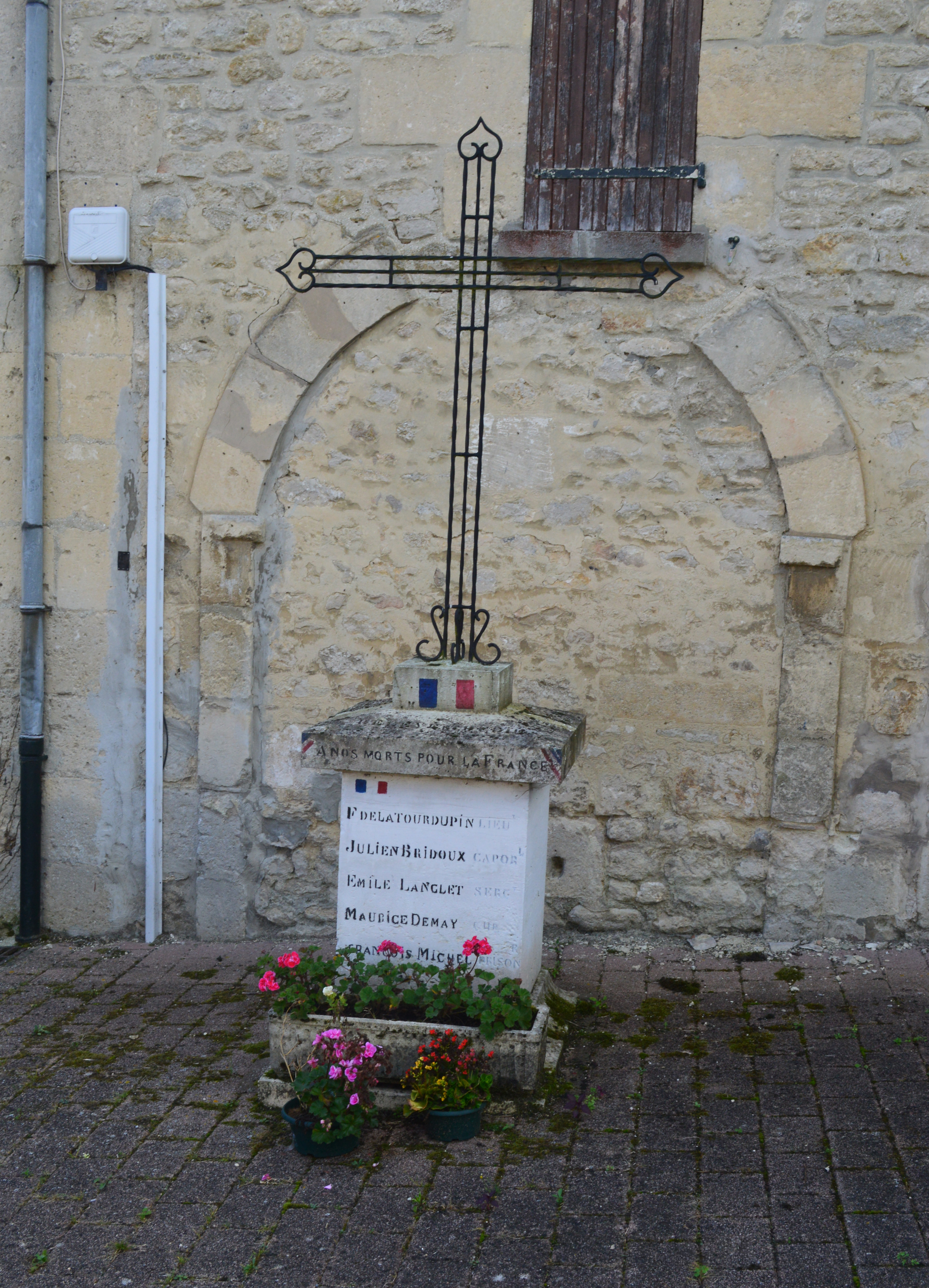
Arrancy War Memorial

== Culture and heritage ==
=== Civil heritage ===
The commune has two buildings and structures that are registered as historical monuments:

- The Chateau of Arrancy (17th century) is registered as an historical monument.
- The old Chateau of Arranceau (15th century) is registered as an historical monument.

=== Religious heritage ===
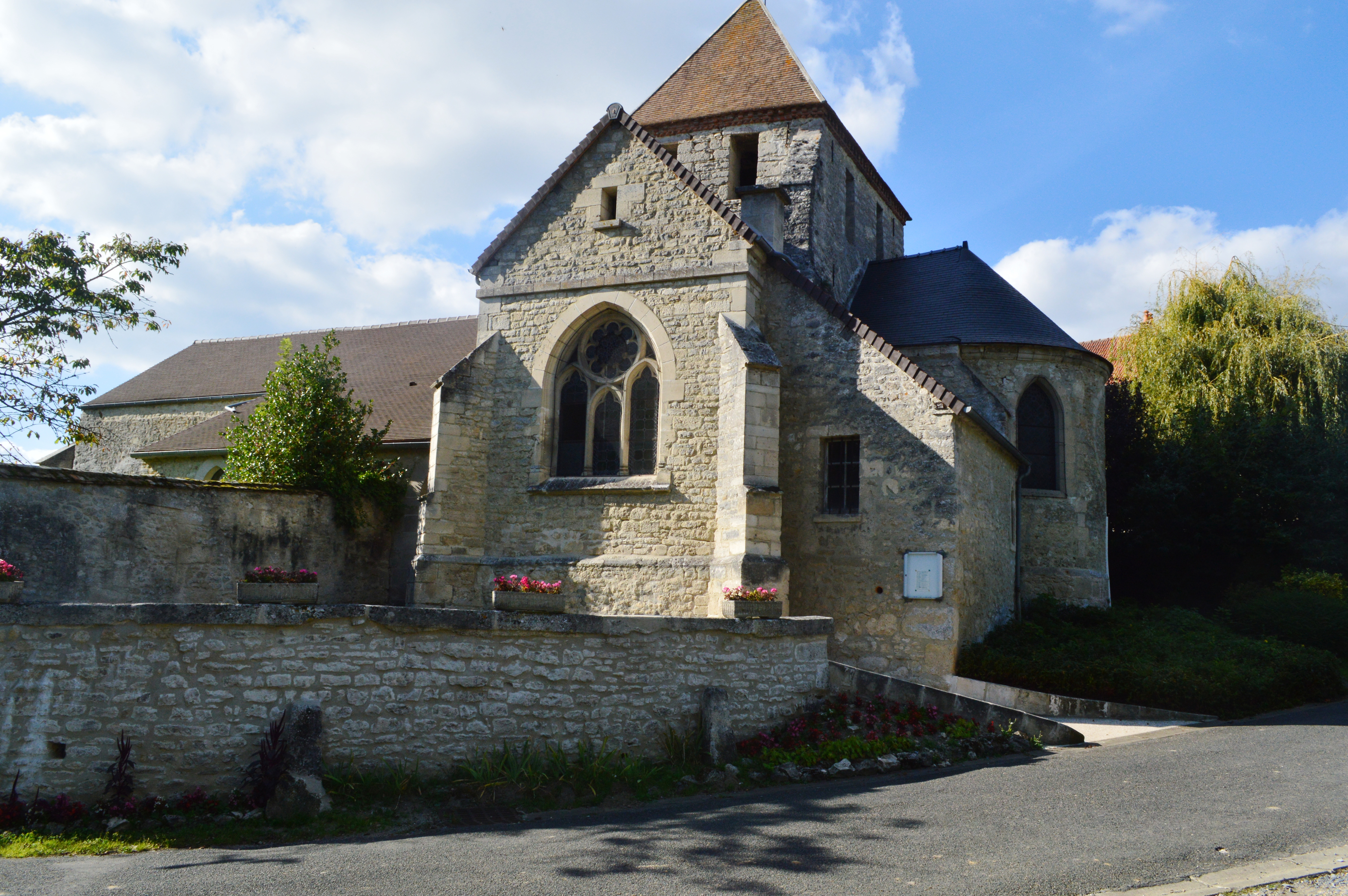
The Church of Saint-Rémi

The Church of Saint-Rémi contains many items that are registered as historical objects:

- A Statue (16th century)
- A Statue: Saint Barbe (16th century)
- A Tombstone of Charles Duglas, his wife, and their children (1703)
- A Tombstone of Louis de Proisy and Louise de Gris, his wife (1628)
- A Tombstone of Philippe Duglas (1614)
- A Tombstone of Jacques de Proisy, Baron of La Bove, and Claudine d'Espena, his wife (1561)

== Notable people linked to the commune ==
- Thomas-Antoine-Jean Maussion, French politician, Mayor of Arrancy, died there in 1839.
- Lieutenant-Colonel René de La Tour du Pin, Marquis of La Charce, was born on 1 April 1834 in Arrancy.

== See also ==
- Communes of the Aisne department
