= Boury-en-Vexin =

- Commune
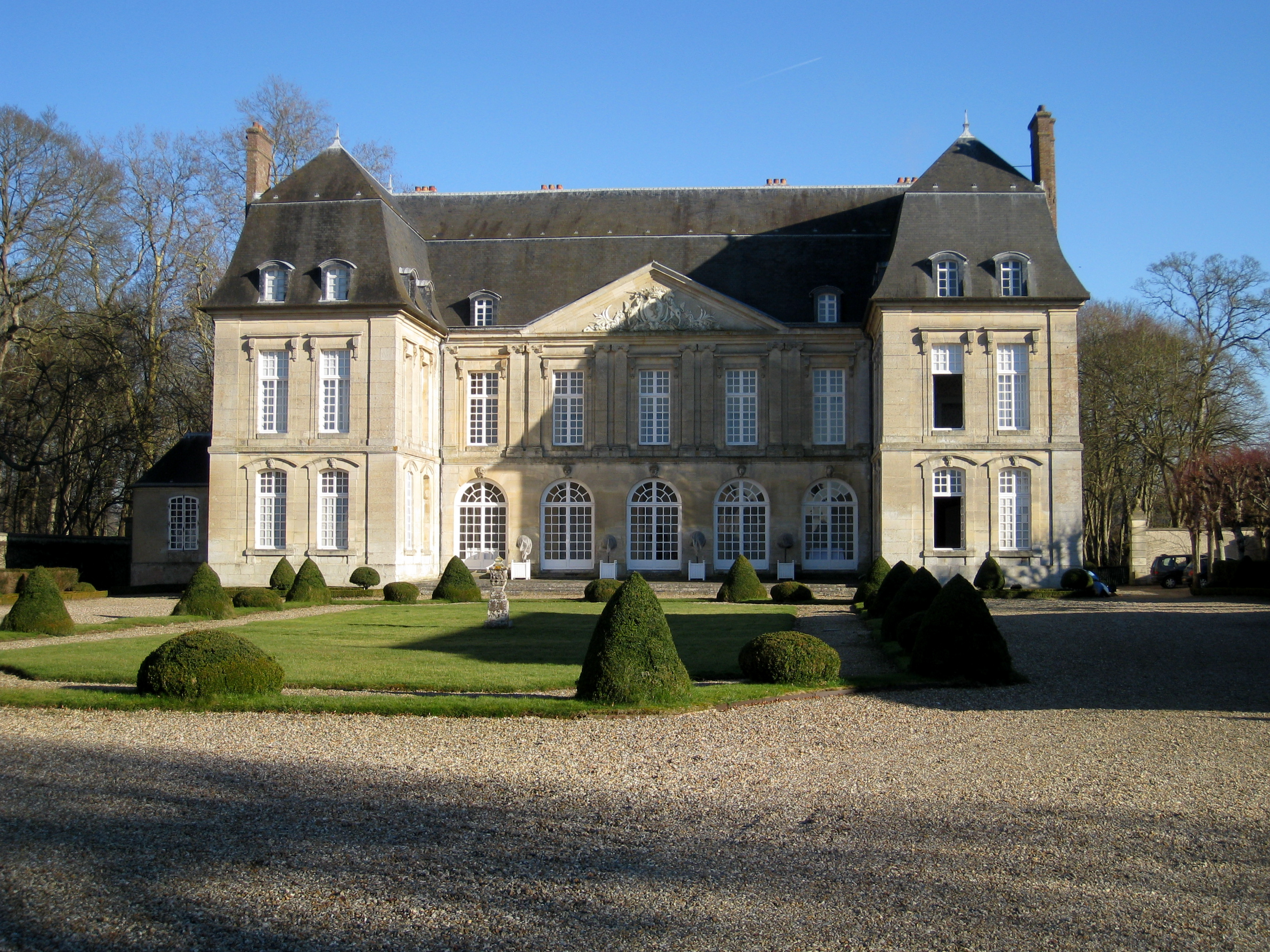
- Château de Boury
- Location of Boury-en-Vexin
- Location within France Location within Hauts-de-France
- Coordinates: 49°14′30″N 1°44′13″E
- Country: France
- Region: Hauts-de-France
- Department: Oise
- Arrondissement: Beauvais
- Canton: Chaumont-en-Vexin
- Intercommunality: Vexin Thelle

Government
  - Mayor (2020–2026): Marie-José Louis
- Area^{1}: 11.09 km^{2} (4.28 sq mi)
- Highest elevation: 141 m (463 ft)
- Lowest elevation: 37 m (121 ft)
- Population (2023): 343
  - Density: 30.9/km^{2} (80.1/sq mi)
- Time zone: UTC+01:00 (CET)
  - Summer (DST): UTC+02:00 (CEST)
- INSEE/Postal code: 60095 /60240
- ^{1} French Land Register data, which excludes lakes, ponds, glaciers > 1 km^{2} (0.386 sq mi or 247 acres) and river estuaries.

Boury-en-Vexin (French pronunciation: [buʁi ɑ̃ vɛksɛ̃], literally Boury in Vexin) is a commune in the Oise department in northern France.

== Population ==
Historical population
Year	Pop.	±% p.a.
1968	282	—
1975	280	−0.10%
1982	289	+0.45%
1990	331	+1.71%
1999	306	−0.87%
2007	343	+1.44%
2012	340	−0.18%
2017	341	+0.06%
2023	343	+0.10%
Source: INSEE

== See also ==
- Communes of the Oise department
