= Pauline Marie Armande Craven =

French author

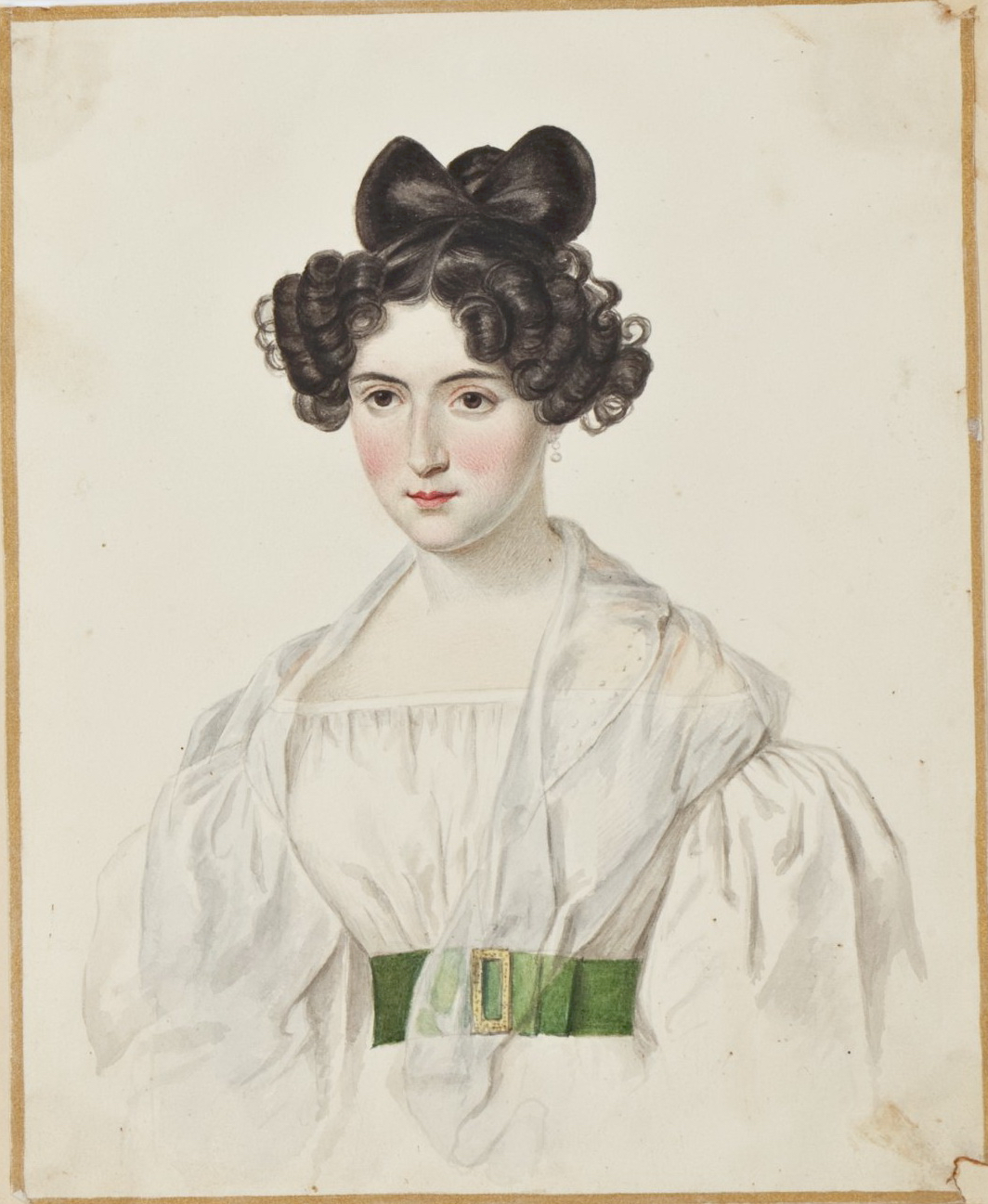

Pauline Marie Armande Aglaé Craven (née Ferron de La Ferronnays; 12 April 1808 – 1 April 1891) was a French writer.

== Early life ==
She was born in London, the daughter of comte Auguste de La Ferronnays, a Breton nobleman. Her father was a close friend of the duc de Bern, whom he accompanied on his return to France in 1814. He and his wife were attached to the court of Charles X at the Tuileries, but a momentary quarrel with the duc de Bern made retirement imperative to the comte's sense of honor.

De La Ferronnays was appointed ambassador to St. Petersburg, and in 1827 became foreign minister in Paris. Pauline was thus brought up in high social surroundings, but she derived her strongest impressions from the group of Catholic thinkers that gathered around Lamennais.

In 1828 her father was sent to Rome, and Pauline, at the suggestion of the art critic Alexis Rio, made her first literary essay with a description of the emotions that she experienced on a visit to the catacombs. During the July Revolution, M. de La Ferronnays resigned his position, and retired with his family to Naples. Here Pauline met her future husband, Augustus Craven, who was then attached to the British embassy. His father, Richard Keppel Craven, the well-known supporter of Queen Caroline, objected to his son's marriage, as Augustus didn't have an income to support such a wife; but his scruples were overcome, and immediately after the marriage (1834) Augustus Craven joined the Roman Catholic Church.

== Literary career ==
Mrs. Craven's family life was depicted in Le Récit d'une Sœur as especially tender and intimate. She suffered several severe bereavements in the years following her marriage. The Cravens lived abroad until 1851, the year in which Keppel Richard Craven died. His son's diplomatic career appeared unsuccessful. He stood unsuccessfully for election to Parliament for Dublin in 1852 after which he retired to private life. The family went to live in Naples in 1853. Mrs. Craven then began to write the history of the family life of the La Ferronnays between 1830 and 1836. Its focus was the love story of her brother Albert and his wife Alexandrine. This book, Le Récit d'une Sœur (1866, English translation 1868), was enthusiastically received and was awarded a prize by the French Academy.

Strained circumstances made it vital that Mrs. Craven earn money by writing. Anne Severin appeared in 1868, Fleurange in 1871, Le Mot de l'énigme in 1874, and Le Valbriant (Eng. trans., Lucia) in 1886. Among her miscellaneous works are La Sœur Natalie Narischkin (1876), Deux Incidents de la question catholique en Angleterre (1875) and Lady Georgiana Fullerton, sa vie et ses œuvres (1888). Mrs. Craven's charming personality won her many friends; she was a frequent guest of Lord Palmerston, Lord Ellesmere and Lord Granville.

Before his death in 1884, her husband translated her correspondence with Lord Palmerston and her correspondence with the Prince Consort into French. She died in Paris on 1 April 1891.
