= Society of Catholic Worker Circles =

French Catholic association

The Society of Catholic Worker Circles (French: L'Oeuvre des Cercles Catholiques d'Ouvriers) is an association created in 1871 by Count Albert de Mun.

== History ==
In 1865, the "Association of Young Workers", founded by Maurice Maignen in 1855, became the "Circle of Young Workers", better known as "Circle Montparnasse", located at 126 boulevard du Montparnasse. In 1871, the first circle was inaugurated in Lyon by Count Albert de Mun, in the district where the Canut revolts occurred, the Croix-Rousse.

The circle included many notables of the clergy, the judiciary, and the military. In the second and third circles that started shortly thereafter, the presence of officers became less conspicuous. The association also included among its founders and leaders René de la Tour du Pin, Felix de Roquefeuil-Cahuzac and Maignen. These Social Reformers wanted to re-Christianize the people and contribute to the defense of its moral and material interests, to prevent another tragedy like the Paris Commune.

These "Circles", managed by workers, however, remained under the care of persons of the Bourgeoisie and benefactors. By 1878, the association in France grew to a total of 375 clubs, 37,500 workers and 7,600 members of the ruling classes. In Lyon, the circles survived until the early 1930s.

Despite numerous activities (joint union building, tailors' guild, popular lectures), the association had relatively little influence on the working class. However, it was within it that was born the Catholic Association of French Youth (l’Association Catholique de la Jeunesse Française - ACJF) and "Corporation of Christian Journalists" (Syndicat des Journalistes Français - French Union of Journalists). In 1886, magistrate and journalist, Victor de Marolles, became the first president of the French Union of Journalists and created the Journal of the Society of Catholic Worker Circles.
