= Maurice Maignen =

19th-century French Catholic religious brother and social reformer

Maurice Maignen, RSV

Religious Brother, Founder, Social Reformer
- Born: Jules-Charles-Maurice Maignen; 3 March 1822; Paris, Île-de-France, France
- Died: 7 December 1890 (aged 68); Paris, Île-de-France, France
- Venerated in: Roman Catholic Church

Maurice Maignen (1822–1890) was a French Social Reformer and a Roman Catholic Religious Brother during the nineteenth century. He was the founder of the Catholic Circle of Montparnasse to prevent future tragedies from happening, like the Paris Commune.

== Biography ==
Maurice Maignen (Jules-Charles-Maurice Maignen) was born in Paris, on March 3, 1822, to Charles-Desire-Adelaide Maignen and Cecile-Josephine (née Chamigner), before the Revolution. He was baptized at Saint-Germain l'Auxerrois three days later. In 1818, his father, an artist, graduated from Académie des Beaux-Arts in Paris, before joining the Military House of the King, as a bodyguard. His father returned to painting only after two years of service.

Maignen was schooled for only six years. At 15, he started working, to provide for his family because of his father's illness. He started working on the newly formed railroad, Compagnie du chemin de fer de Paris à Saint-Germain, the predecessor to Compagnie des chemins de fer de l'Ouest, where he remained until 1843, before becoming a draftsman at the Ministry of War. He found, with Jean-Léon Le Prevost and Clement Myionnet, the Congregation of the Brothers of St. Vincent de Paul with the apostolate of education of the youth and evangelisation of the poor and workers.

In 1855, at the age of 33, Maignen created an "Association of Young Workers" and, in 1865, it evolved into the "Circle of Young Workers", better known as "Catholic Circle of Montparnasse". In the winter of 1871, he met two officers, former prisoners of war, Albert de Mun and René de la Tour du Pin, who remained lifelong friends with him. Both Albert and René found the Society of Catholic Worker Circles, through the inspiration of Brother Maurice.

Maignen died on December 7, 1890. His body was interred in the Chapel at the Montparnasse Circle and his heart was encased in a reliquary in the Motherhouse of his "Congregation of the Brothers of St. Vincent de Paul."

== Notes and references ==
The information on this page is partially translated from the equivalent page in French fr:Maurice Maignen licensed under the Creative Commons/Attribution Sharealike . History of contributions can be checked here:.
