= Au milieu des sollicitudes =

1892 papal encyclical by Leo XIII

Encyclical of Pope Leo XIII
- Signature date: 16 February 1892
- Subject: "On the French Third Republic"

Au milieu des sollicitudes is an encyclical published on 16 February 1892 by Pope Leo XIII. In this encyclical, Leo XIII called on the Catholics of France to accept the French Third Republic, a policy later known as the Ralliement.

This encyclical was primarily addressed to the episcopate of France, the clergy, and French Catholics. Its subtitle is: The Church and the State in France.

It builds upon themes developed in the 1884 encyclical Nobilissima Gallorum gens. Its main goal was to encourage all French Catholics to rally to the Republic. The document followed the Toast of Algiers delivered by Cardinal Lavigerie in 1890.

Uniquely, it was written in French rather than the customary Latin.

== Background ==
At the time, the Church in France was governed by a concordat. However, the fledgling French Third Republic pursued an anti-clerical policy of laïcité, shutting down Catholic schools and convents.

The election of republican deputies to the Chamber in 1889 left conservatives—and even radicals—in the minority.

== Content ==
In this encyclical, Leo XIII urged French Catholics to unite within the Republic. He stated: "We believe it is appropriate, even necessary, to raise our voice again to exhort more earnestly—not only Catholics—but all honest and sensible Frenchmen to reject any seed of political dissent and to devote their energies solely to the pacification of their country."

== Letter to the cardinals of France ==
Subsequently, in a letter to the French cardinals dated 3 May 1892, Leo XIII was even more explicit: "We have said to French Catholics: Accept the Republic, meaning the constituted and existing authority among you; respect it; submit to it as representing the authority that comes from God." In the same letter, Leo XIII noted that French bishops unanimously signed a letter of approval for the encyclical Au milieu des sollicitudes in 1892.

== Consequences ==
Some deputies, including Count Albert de Mun and Jacques Piou, conformed to the views of the Holy See and established the Popular Liberal Action, laying the groundwork for the future Christian democracy. Their support for this policy became known as the "ralliement".
