= Ralliement (Catholicism in France) =

Period of reproach between French Catholics and liberal republicanism

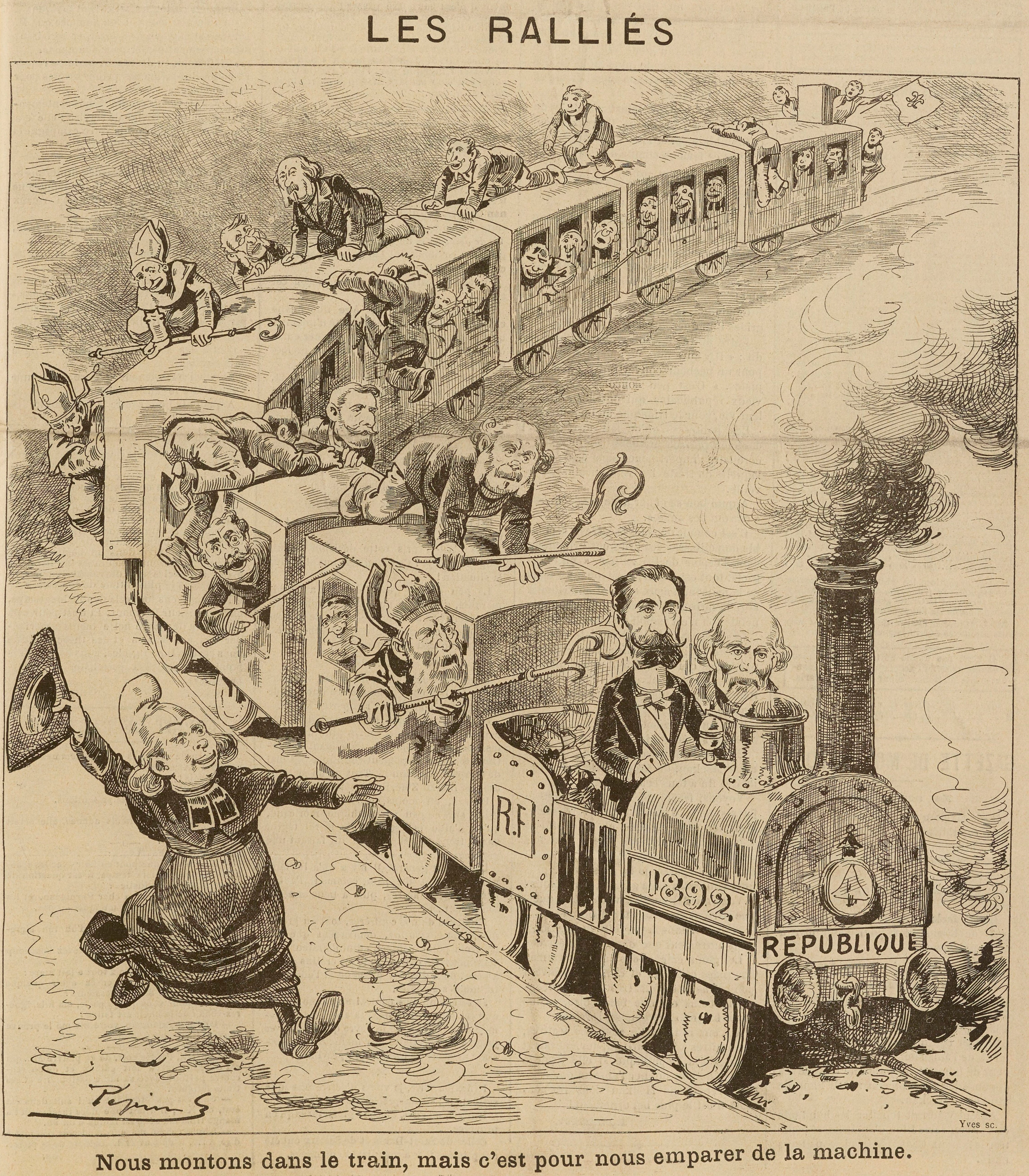
Les Ralliés, a satirical cartoon by Édouard Pépin published in Le Grelot in October 1892. French president Sadi Carnot drives the train, with Charles de Freycinet at his side; just behind them, Charles Lavigerie tries to grab hold with his crosier. Caption: "We board the train, but it is to seize the engine," a quote from Catholic priest Théodore Garnier on 19 June 1892.

The Ralliement refers to the policy adopted by some Catholics in France to support the French Third Republic following the publication of the papal encyclical Au milieu des sollicitudes on February 16, 1892, by Pope Leo XIII. Supporters of this position were called the Ralliés (Rallying Catholics).

According to Bruno Dumons, "The emergence of a more moderate Republic encouraged Catholics to embrace reconciliation. By endorsing openness, Roman and episcopal authorities fostered initiatives attempting a conservative Catholic right-wing experiment, which renounced monarchy and accepted republican institutions."

This policy of rapprochement with French secular republicanism initially generated great hope among the Ralliés—Christian democrats and liberal Catholics—but was shattered by the Dreyfus affair at the end of the 19th century. "The wave of anti-Semitism that followed engulfed French Catholicism, despite a handful of Dreyfusards. This well-documented episode caused a political crisis, resulting in divided Catholic political stances—from the Action Française (1898) to Le Sillon (1899)—and a republican 'defense government' seeking to revive secularism out of fear of clericalism."

== Church Stance Before the Ralliement ==
Prior to the Ralliement, the Roman Catholic Church in France maintained a predominantly monarchist stance, aligning itself with traditional royalist factions and opposing the French Third Republic. The political upheaval of the 19th century, including the French Revolution, the fall of the Second French Empire, and the rise of republicanism, placed the Church at odds with the secular, often anticlerical, policies of the republics that followed.

The First Vatican Council (1869–1870) and the proclamation of papal infallibility further emphasized the Church's ultramontane position, asserting strong allegiance to the Holy See over national political structures. As a result, the Church found itself increasingly isolated in French political life, with many clergy and lay faithful staunchly opposing republican institutions.

This conflict was exacerbated by events such as the separation of church and state debates and the education reform efforts that promoted secular schooling over Catholic institutions. Prominent Catholic figures, including bishops, actively voiced their opposition to republican governance, often advocating for the restoration of a monarchy they believed would uphold Catholic values.

By the late 19th century, however, a series of political and social changes—such as the failure of the Boulangist movement and the solidification of republican institutions—began to shift the Church's perspective. Recognizing the need for reconciliation and the impossibility of a monarchical restoration, the groundwork for the Ralliement was laid, culminating in the papal encyclical Au milieu des sollicitudes in 1892.

== Background ==
The Ralliement followed the failure of the Boulangist coup d'état in 1889, which demonstrated the resilience of French republican institutions. After the 1889 elections, the movement gained momentum. Albert de Mun wrote to the royalist pretender stating that restoration via universal suffrage was impossible, though the causes of monarchism remained. He advocated for a more conservative, religiously focused approach.

At the same time, Cardinal Charles Lavigerie of Algiers accepted republican priests.

In 1890, Cardinal Domenico Ferrata reported to Pope Leo XIII, advising Catholics to dissociate from anti-republicanism.

== Toast of Algiers ==
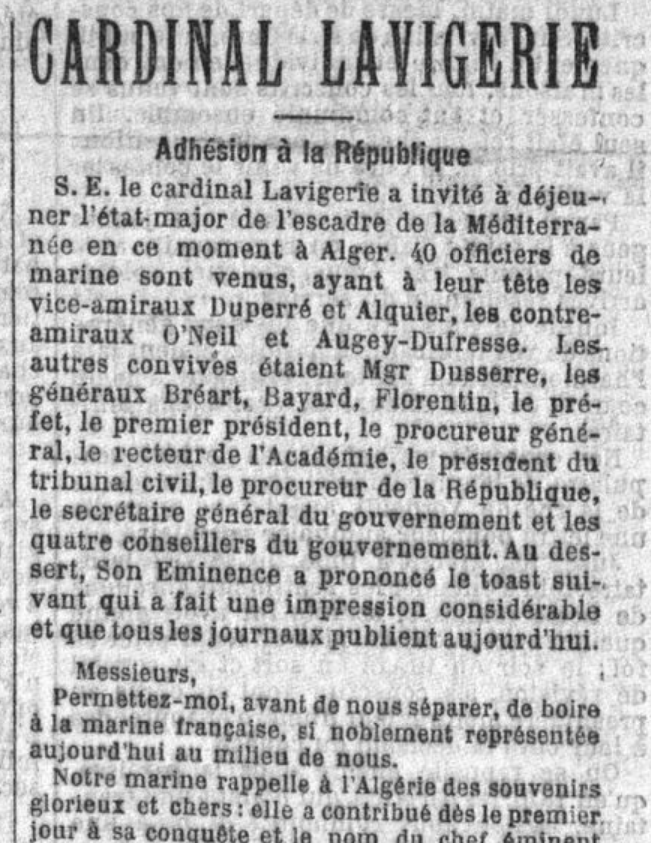
Excerpt from La Croix (November 14, 1890) reporting Cardinal Lavigerie's "Toast of Algiers"

On November 12, 1890, Cardinal Lavigerie hosted French naval officers in Algiers. Raising his glass, he declared: "When a people's will has been clearly expressed...it becomes necessary to embrace the form of government to save the nation."

This declaration, orchestrated by the Vatican, paved the way for the 1892 encyclical Au milieu des sollicitudes.

== Encyclical Au milieu des sollicitudes ==
The encyclical Au milieu des sollicitudes called for reconciliation between the Church and France's secular government. Pope Leo XIII urged Catholics to support the republic for the common good while maintaining religious principles.
