= List of senators of Rhône =

Location of Rhône in France

Following is a list of senators of Rhône, people who have represented the department of Rhône in the Senate of France.

== Third Republic ==
Senators for Rhône under the French Third Republic were:

- Marie-Edmond Valentin (1876–1879)
- Jules Favre (1876–1880)
- Jean-Baptiste Perret (1876–1882)
- Lucien Mangini (1876–1882)
- Germain Vallier (1880–1883)
- Édouard Millaud (1880–1912)
- Louis Munier (1882–1896)
- Émile Guyot (1882–1906)
- Jean-Claude Perras (1885–1899)
- François Thévenet (1892–1900)
- Albert Bouffier (1897–1909)
- Louis Million (1899–1900)
- Léon Repiquet (1900–1909)
- Antonin Gourju (1900–1909) and (1920–1926)
- Henry Fleury-Ravarin (1906–1909)
- Antoine Ponteille (1909–1918)
- Victor Vermorel (1909–1920)
- Georges Eugène Charles Beauvisage (1909–1920)
- Paul Cazeneuve (1909–1920)
- Édouard Herriot (1912–1919)
- Eugène Ruffier (1920–1924)
- Jean Coignet (1920–1927)
- Paul Duquaire (1920–1927)
- Eugène Bussy (1920–1927)
- Laurent Bonnevay (1924–1927)
- Justin Godart (1926–1940)
- Robert Lacroix (1927–1931)
- Jean Voillot (1927–1936)
- Irénée Giraud (1927–1936)
- Camille Rolland (1927–1940)
- Émile Bender (1931–1940)
- Joseph Depierre (1936–1940)
- Jean Froget (1936–1940)

== Fourth Republic ==
Senators for Rhône under the French Fourth Republic were:

- Maria Pacaut (1946–1948)
- Germain Pontille (1946–1948)
- Louis Dupic (1946–1959)
- Joseph Voyant (1946–1959)
- Auguste Pinton (1946–1959)
- André Lassagne (1948–1953)
- Claudius Delorme (1948–1959)
- Florian Bruyas (1953–1959)

== Fifth Republic ==
Senators for Rhône under the French Fifth Republic:

- Florian Bruyas (1959–1968)
- Auguste Pinton (1959–1977)
- Joseph Voyant (1959–1977)
- Claudius Delorme (1959–1977)
- Camille Vallin (1959–1968) and (1977–1986)
- Francisque Collomb (1968–1995)
- Léon Chambaretaud (1968–1974)
- Pierre Vallon (1974–1995)
- Franck Sérusclat (1977–1999)
- Alfred Gerin (1977–1986)
- Serge Mathieu (1977–2004)
- Jean Mercier (1977–1986)
- René Trégouët (1986–2004)
- Emmanuel Hamel (1986–2003)
- Roland Bernard (1986–1995)
- Guy Fischer (1995–2014)
- Gilbert Chabroux (1995–2004)
- Jacques Moulinier (2003–2004)
- Muguette Dini (2004–2014)
- Christiane Demontès (2004–2014)
- Jean-Jacques Pignard (2009–2012) then in 2014
- Michel Mercier, Union pour la démocratie française (1995-2009), Named minister 23 June 2009, replaced by Jean-Jacques Pignard from 24 July 2009 to 16 May 2012, resigned 22 April 2014, replaced by Jean-Jacques Pignard

=== Senators from 2014 ===
Senators from 2014 were:

In office	Name	Party or group	Notes
From 2014	François-Noël Buffet	Union for a Popular Movement (UMP)	
From 2014	Catherine Di Folco	Union for a Popular Movement (UMP)	
From 2014	Michel Forissier	Union for a Popular Movement (UMP)	
From 2014	Élisabeth Lamure	Union for a Popular Movement (UMP)	
2014–2017	Gérard Collomb	Socialist Party (PS)	Named to cabinet 17 June 2017
From 2017	Gilbert-Luc Devinaz	Socialist and Republican	From 18 June 2017, replacing Gérard Collomb
From 2014	Annie Guillemot	Socialist Party (PS)	
2014–2017	Michel Mercier	Union of Democrats and Independents (UDI)	Resigned 30 September 2017
From 2017	Michèle Vullien	Union Centriste	From 1 October 2017, replacing Michel Mercier

== Sources ==
- Liste des anciens sénateurs de la IIIème République par circonscription (in French), Sénat de France
- Liste des anciens sénateurs de la IVème République par circonscription (in French), Sénat de France
- Liste des anciens sénateurs de la Vème République par circonscription (in French), Sénat de France
- Liste par département - Rhône (in French), Sénat de France
