= Bruguier =

Bruguier may refer to:

== People ==
- Theophile Bruguier (August 31, 1813 – February 18, 1896) was a French-Canadian fur trader with the American Fur Company.
- Willard Bruguier III (born 4 December 1981) is a former American professional darts player from South Dakota
- Georges Bruguier, a.k.a. Victorien Félix Bruguier (16 March 1884 – 20 August 1962), called Georges Bruguier, was a French politician and journalist.
- Élisabeth Bruyère or Bruguier (March 19, 1818 – April 5, 1876) was the founder of the Sisters of Charity of Bytown
- Victorien Bruguier was a French trade unionist born in 1858 in Montclus (Gard) and died on December 28, 1941
- Michel Bruguier (1921-1967) was a French lawyer and resistance fighter.

== Buildings and monuments ==
- Theophile Bruguier Cabin is a historic building located in Sioux City, Iowa, United States.
- County Bruguier, a former county in South Dakota.
- Campagne Bruguier
