= List of prisoners of Flossenbürg =

Nazi concentration camp prisoners

This article is a fragmentary list of people who were imprisoned at Flossenbürg concentration camp.

== Notable inmates who were executed ==
- Alberto Murer, Italian Army Brigadier, (executed 7 October 1944).
- Augustín Malár, Ján Golian, Rudolf Viest, and Štefan Jurech, Slovak Generals and commanders of Slovak National Uprising were probably executed in Flossenbürg.
- Costantino Salvi, Italian Army Major General, (executed 17 January 1945).
- Dietrich Bonhoeffer, German Lutheran pastor and theologian, supporter of anti-Hitler conspiracy (executed 9 April 1945).
- Count Guglielmo Barbò di Casalmorano, Italian Army Major General, (executed 14 December 1944).
- Gustave Biéler, SOE agent (executed 6 September 1944)
- Hans Oster, German army General, deputy head of the Abwehr under Canaris and a primary plotter against Hitler (executed 9 April 1945).
- Jack Agazarian, British Special Operations Executive in France (executed March 1945).
- Karl Sack, German General and military jurist (executed 9 April 1945).
- Rowlen Dowlen, British Special Operations Executive in France (executed 29 March 1945)
- Wilhelm Canaris, German Admiral, head of the Abwehr (military intelligence service) 1935–1944 and member of the German Resistance (executed 9 April 1945).

== Notable inmates who survived ==
- Bertram James ("Jimmy" James), British RAF officer, survivor of the Great Escape.
- Camille Bedin, French politician and member of the Vichy 80.
- Dmitry Karbyshev, former officer in the Russian Imperial Army, Soviet Red Army General, in 1943–1944.
- Ignacy Oziewicz, Polish general, the first commandant of Narodowe Sily Zbrojne.
- Jack Terry, born Jakub Szabmacher, is a Polish-American author. He was the youngest surviving prisoner of the camp.
- Jerzy Misiński, president of governing body for the sport of athletics in Poland - Polski Związek Lekkiej Atletyki (PZLA).
- Josef Kohout, subject of the book Die Männer mit dem rosa Winkel ("The Men With the Pink Triangle")
- Kurt Schumacher, German social democratic politician, future head of SPD.
- Marian P. Opala, Polish underground fighter, later a Polish-American lawyer who served as Chief Justice of the Oklahoma Supreme Court.
- Walter Hamböck, Hitler's pianist 1936-1939.
- Marian Główka, Polish teacher and scout movement organizer in the Upper Silesia region, since 10.1933 Rydułtowy Regiment Scoutmaster, participant of "death march" from Hersbrueck to Dachau, after the World War II director and teacher in secondary schools in Bielsko-Biała, Poland.
- Mieczysław Seweryn Mak-Piątkowski, Polish military officer and Polish Military Organisation activist.
- Prince Philipp, Landgrave of Hesse, German aristocrat, served as Governor of Hesse-Kassel as a member of the Nazi Party. He later fell out with the Party and was imprisoned at Flossenbürg in September 1943. Great-grandson of Frederick III, German Emperor and great-grandson of Queen Victoria.
- Pyotr Georgyevich Novikov, a Red Army Major General captured by German forces following the Siege of Sevastopol.
- Stefan Pomarański, Polish historian and scouting instructor, founder of Polish Scouting Movement.
- Vaclav Valek, J.D, Czech lawyer from Prague, member of Sokol (athletic club).
- Vaclav Valek, Jr., Czech student of law at Charles University of Prague, son of Vaclav Valek, J.D.
