= James Hennessy =

James Hennessy may refer to:

- James Hennessy (diplomat) (1923–2024), British diplomat and civil servant
- James Hennessy (politician) (1867–1945), French politician, naval officer and equestrian
- James Hennessy, 2nd Baron Windlesham (1903–1962), British peer and decorated British Army officer
