= Buisset =

Buisset is a surname. Notable people with the surname include:

- Séraphin Buisset (1870–1949), French politician
- Jean-Marie Buisset (1938–2010), Belgian field-hockey player and bobsledder
