= Zunino =

Zunino is an Italian surname from the region of Liguria in northern Italy. Notable people with the surname include:

- João Nílson Zunino (1946–2014), or Zunino, Brazilian football club executive
- Marco Zunino (born 1976), Peruvian film, television and stage actor and singer-songwriter
- Michel Zunino (1889–1958), French Communist politician and resistance member
- Mike Zunino (born 1991), American baseball player
- Ricardo Zunino (born 1949), Argentine racing driver
