= Pézières =

Pezières or Pézières may refer to:

== People ==
- Georges Pézières (1885–1941), French politician

== Places ==
- Les Pézières, hamlet of the municipality of Aranc in the Ain department, France
- Pezières, Épehy, former hamlet and municipality, currently a part of the municipality of Épehy in the Somme department, France
