= The Eighty (Vichy France) =

French parliamentarians opposed to dissolution of the Third Republic

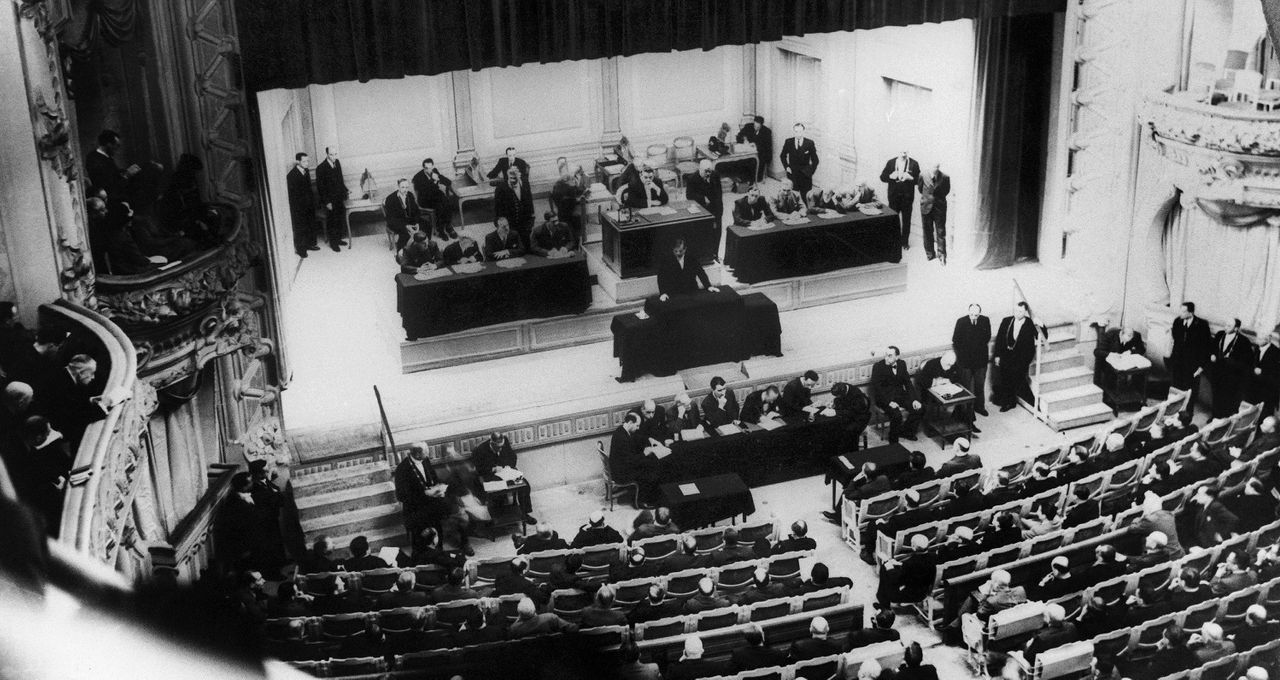
The National Assembly (under the Third Republic, the name given to the meeting of the Senate and the Chamber of Deputies) seating in the Vichy Opera, on July 10, 1940, the day of the vote of the full constituent powers to Marshal Pétain.

The Eighty (Les Quatre-Vingts) were a group of elected French parliamentarians who, on 10 July 1940, voted against the constitutional change that effectively dissolved the Third Republic and established the authoritarian regime of then-Prime Minister Philippe Pétain. Their efforts failed, and Pétain consolidated his regime into the client state of Nazi Germany now known as Vichy France.

Some of the Vichy 80, like Léon Blum, would go on to be imprisoned by regime, while others managed to join the French Resistance, through groups like the Francs-Tireurs et Partisans and the Brutus network. Several of the Eighty, including Vincent Auriol and Paul Ramadier, would play key roles in the establishment of the French Fourth Republic after the end of World War II.

== Background ==
Nazi Germany invaded France on 10 May 1940, and Paris fell a month later. Prime Minister Paul Reynaud was opposed to asking for armistice terms, and upon losing the cabinet vote, resigned. President Albert Lebrun appointed Marshal Philippe Pétain as his replacement. France capitulated on 22 June 1940. Under the terms of the armistice, the northern and Atlantic coast region of France was to be militarily occupied by Germany. The remainder would remain unoccupied, with the French Government remaining at Vichy, remaining responsible for all civil government in France, occupied and unoccupied.

Pétain began a revision of the constitution of the discredited Third Republic. This process was completed with a vote of the combined houses of the parliament on 10 July 1940.

== Vote ==
27 deputies and senators did not take part in the vote. They had fled Metropolitan France on 21 June, from Bordeaux to Algiers, on board the liner SS Massilia, and they are referred to as the Massilia absentees. They were considered traitors by the collaborationist government, although they were seen as heroes after the war.

The result of the vote was a constitutional amendment that created the new French government. The eighty deputies and senators who opposed the change are referred to as the Vichy 80 (French: "les quatre-vingts"), and they are now famous for their decision to oppose the vote.

Most of the eighty votes against the change were lodged by Socialists or Radical-Socialists. Sixty-one communist parliamentarians had previously had their rights to serve as deputies and senators denied to them in January 1940, as the Soviet Union was a co-belligerent of Nazi Germany at the time. Using data collected from the biographies of parliamentarians, Jean Lacroix, Pierre-Guillaume Méon, and Kim Oosterlinck (2023) observe that members of a democratic dynasty, defined as a dynasty whose founder was a defender of democratic ideals, were 9.6 to 15.1 percentage points more likely to oppose the act than other parliamentarians.

The historian Richard Vinen has observed that "the implications of supporting Pétain in July 1940 were not clear. This was not, for all its subsequent mythology, a vote that divided Pétaininsts and/or collaborators from resisters." He highlights the cases of Joseph Laniel who voted in favour of Pétain's inauguration but was subsequently a leading member of the French resistance and the Conseil national de la Résistance. Isidore Thivrier, by contrast, who was among the 80 to vote against, subsequently embraced the Vichy regime and became a member of Vichy's National Council.

== Vote tally ==
	Deputies	Senators	Total
Total	544	302	846
Voting	414	235	649
For	357	212	569
Against	57	23	80
Voluntary abstaining	12	8	20
Massilia absentees	26	1	27
Other abstaining	92	57	149
Not voting		1	1

== List of the 80 ==
Name	House	Département	Parliamentary group
Marcel Astier	Senate	Ardèche	Radical-Socialist
Jean-Fernand Audeguil	Chamber of Deputies	Gironde	SFIO
Vincent Auriol	Chamber of Deputies	Haute-Garonne	SFIO
Alexandre Bachelet	Senate	Seine	SFIO
Vincent Badie	Chamber of Deputies	Hérault	Radical-Socialist
Camille Bedin	Chamber of Deputies	Dordogne	SFIO
Émile Bender	Senate	Rhône	Radical-Socialist
Jean Biondi	Chamber of Deputies	Oise	SFIO
Léon Blum	Chamber of Deputies	Aude	SFIO
Laurent Bonnevay	Chamber of Deputies	Rhône	AD
Paul Boulet	Chamber of Deputies	Hérault	LJR
Georges Bruguier	Senate	Gard	SFIO
Séraphin Buisset	Chamber of Deputies	Isère	SFIO
Gaston Cabannes	Chamber of Deputies	Gironde	SFIO
François Camel	Chamber of Deputies	Ariège	SFIO
Pierre de Chambrun	Senate	Lozère	Independent
Auguste Champetier de Ribes	Senate	Basses-Pyrénées	Independent
Pierre Chaumié	Senate	Lot-et-Garonne	Radical-Socialist
Arthur Chaussy	Chamber of Deputies	Seine-et-Marne	SFIO
Joseph Collomp	Chamber of Deputies	Var	SFIO
Octave Crutel	Chamber of Deputies	Seine-Inférieure	Radical-Socialist
Achille Daroux	Chamber of Deputies	Vendée	Radical-Socialist
Maurice Delom-Sorbé	Chamber of Deputies	Basses-Pyrénées	Independent Left
Joseph Depierre	Senate	Rhône	SFIO
Marx Dormoy	Senate	Allier	SFIO
Alfred Elmiger	Chamber of Deputies	Rhône	Independent Left
Paul Fleurot	Senate	Seine	Radical-Socialist
Émile Fouchard	Chamber of Deputies	Seine-et-Marne	UPF
Édouard Froment	Chamber of Deputies	Ardèche	SFIO
Paul Giaccobi	Senate	Corse	Radical-Socialist
Justin Godart	Senate	Rhône	Radical-Socialist
Félix Gouin	Chamber of Deputies	Bouches-du-Rhône	SFIO
Henri Gout	Chamber of Deputies	Aude	Radical-Socialist
Louis Gros	Senate	Vaucluse	SFIO
Amédée Guy	Chamber of Deputies	Haute-Savoie	SFIO
Jean Hennessy	Chamber of Deputies	Alpes-Maritimes	Independent Left
Lucien Hussel	Chamber of Deputies	Isère	SFIO
André Isoré	Chamber of Deputies	Pas-de-Calais	Radical-Socialist
Eugène Jardon	Chamber of Deputies	Allier	UPF
Jean-Alexis Jaubert	Chamber of Deputies	Corrèze	Radical-Socialist
Claude Jordery	Chamber of Deputies	Rhône	SFIO
François Labrousse	Senate	Corrèze	Radical-Socialist
Albert Le Bail	Chamber of Deputies	Finistère	Radical-Socialist
Joseph Lecacheux	Chamber of Deputies	Manche	AD
Victor Le Gorgeu	Senate	Finistère	Radical-Socialist
Justin Luquot	Chamber of Deputies	Gironde	SFIO
Augustin Malroux	Chamber of Deputies	Tarn	SFIO
Gaston Manent	Chamber of Deputies	Hautes-Pyrénées	Radical-Socialist
Alfred Margaine	Chamber of Deputies	Marne	Radical-Socialist
Léon Martin	Chamber of Deputies	Isère	SFIO
Robert Mauger	Chamber of Deputies	Loir-et-Cher	SFIO
Jean Mendiondou	Chamber of Deputies	Basses-Pyrénées	Radical-Socialist
Jules Moch	Chamber of Deputies	Hérault	SFIO
Maurice Montel	Chamber of Deputies	Cantal	Independent Left
Léonel de Moustier	Chamber of Deputies	Doubs	Républicain indépendant
Marius Moutet	Chamber of Deputies	Drôme	SFIO
René Nicod	Chamber of Deputies	Ain	UPF
Louis Noguères	Chamber of Deputies	Pyrénées-Orientales	SFIO
Jean Odin	Senate	Gironde	Radical-Socialist
Joseph Paul-Boncour	Senate	Loir-et-Cher	Socialist Republican Union (USR)
Jean Perrot	Chamber of Deputies	Finistère	Radical-Socialist
Georges Pézières	Senate	Pyrénées-Orientales	SFIO
André Philip	Chamber of Deputies	Rhône	SFIO
Marcel Plaisant	Senate	Cher	Radical-Socialist
François Tanguy-Prigent	Chamber of Deputies	Finistère	SFIO
Paul Ramadier	Chamber of Deputies	Aveyron	Independent
Joseph-Paul Rambaud	Senate	Ariège	Radical-Socialist
René Renout	Senate	Var	Radical-Socialist
Léon Roche	Chamber of Deputies	Haute-Vienne	SFIO
Camille Rolland	Senate	Rhône	Radical-Socialist
Jean-Louis Rolland	Chamber of Deputies	Finistère	SFIO
Joseph Rous	Chamber of Deputies	Pyrénées-Orientales	SFIO
Jean-Emmanuel Roy	Chamber of Deputies	Gironde	Radical-Socialist
Henry Sénès	Senate	Var	SFIO
Philippe Serre	Chamber of Deputies	Meurthe-et-Moselle	Independent Left
Paul Simon	Chamber of Deputies	Finistère	Popular Democrat
Gaston Thiébaut	Chamber of Deputies	Meuse	Radical-Socialist
Isidore Thivrier	Chamber of Deputies	Allier	SFIO
Pierre Trémintin	Chamber of Deputies	Finistère	Popular Democrat
Michel Zunino	Chamber of Deputies	Var	SFIO
