= Social-National Party =

Social-National Party may refer to:

- Social-National Party (France)
- Social-National Party of Ukraine
