= Jean Odin =

French politician

Jean Ernest Sébastien Odin (20 January 1889 – 16 October 1975) was a French politician.

Odin was born in Bordeaux, where his father worked as a ship's captain. At a young age Odin moved to Noumea, New Caledonia, where his father had been transferred, and attended school there.

Upon his return to France, Odin became a lawyer's clerk. Receiving a bursary, he resumed his studies and qualified as a lawyer. By 1917, he was an advocate in Bordeaux, and later in Paris.

He ran unsuccessfully as a Radical in the 1919 and 1924 elections to represent Gironde in the Chamber of Deputies, but succeeded in 1928. In 1932 he was elected to the Senate. He served as a member, and then as secretary, of the Senate committee which dealt with French Navy affairs.

Jean Odin was one of the eighty who voted against granting special powers to Marshal Philippe Pétain on 10 July 1940. His mandate expired on 31 December 1941, ending his political career.

Odin wrote a number of books, Une cause célèbre : le Mystère de l'Ancre Bleue which dealt with the case of Jean-Pierre Vaquier, hanged for the murder of Alfred Jones, with which Odin had been involved in London in 1924. His other successful work was Les Quatre-Vingts on those who had opposed the creation of the Vichy regime.

He was made a chevalier of the Légion d'honneur. He died in Bordeaux.
