= Jean Hennessy =

French politician (1874–1944)

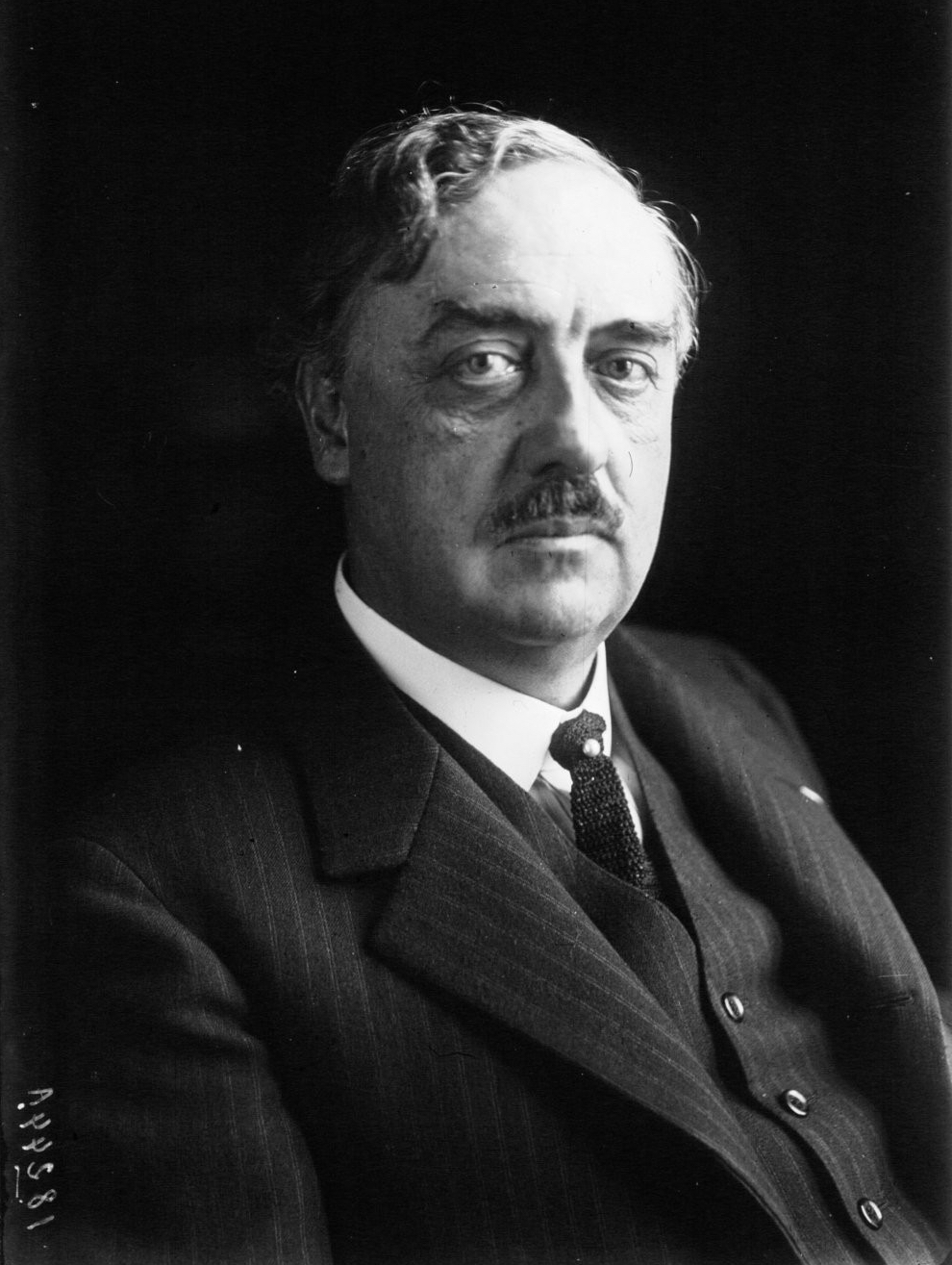
- Hennessy in 1924
- Born: Jean Patrick Hennessy; 26 April 1874; Cherves-Richemont
- Died: 4 November 1944 (aged 70); Lausanne
- Occupations: Politician, diplomat
- Family: James Hennessy

Jean Patrick Hennessy (26 April 1874 – 4 November 1944) was a French politician.

== Early life ==
Hennessy was born at Cherves-Richemont in the Charente département on 26 April 1874. son of Maurice Hennessy and his wife Jeanne, née Foussat. His family, of Irish origin, were the proprietors of the Hennessy cognac business, now part of LVMH.

== Career ==
Hennessy was elected to the French Chamber of Deputies in the French elections on 1924 for the Cartel des Gauches. In doing so, he continued the tradition begun by his great-grandfather Jacques Hennessy, an Orléanist deputy from 1824 to 1842, and his grand-uncle Auguste Hennessy, senator from 1876 to 1879. Hennessy was re-elected in the election of 1928 and served as agriculture minister from 1928 to 1930, and then as French ambassador to Switzerland.

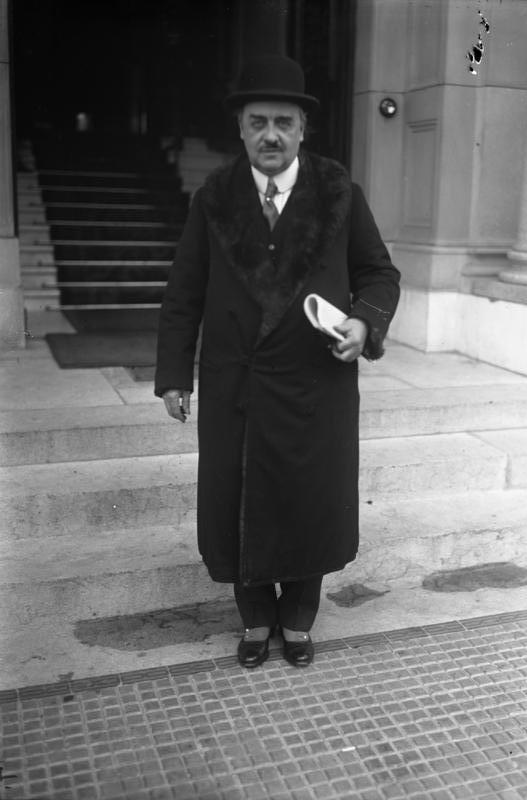
Jean Hennessy in 1930 while serving as French ambassador to Switzerland.

His elder brother, James Hennessy had been elected before him to Parliament as député and senator, but he chose to dedicate himself to the management of the family business.

In the 1932 general election Hennessy was defeated by Henri Malet of the Democratic Republican Alliance. Out of parliament, he founded the Social-National Party and was elected again as deputy for Alpes-Maritimes, sitting with the Independent Left group in the Chamber of Deputies.

On 10 July 1940, at the joint session of the French parliament which granted strong powers to Marshal Philippe Pétain, Jean Hennessy and his brother James were part of the 80 parliamentarians who opposed the measure. He had been married to Marguerite de Mun, who bore him two sons, Patrick and Kilian, and a daughter Jacqueline. Kilian Hennessy (1907–2010) later became chairman of the Cognac business and contributed to its merger into the LVMH group.

=== Death ===
Jean Hennessy died at Lausanne, Switzerland in the 4th of November, 1944, where he had lived since 1941.
