= Theophile Bruguier Cabin =

Historic house in Iowa, United States

- U.S. National Register of Historic Places
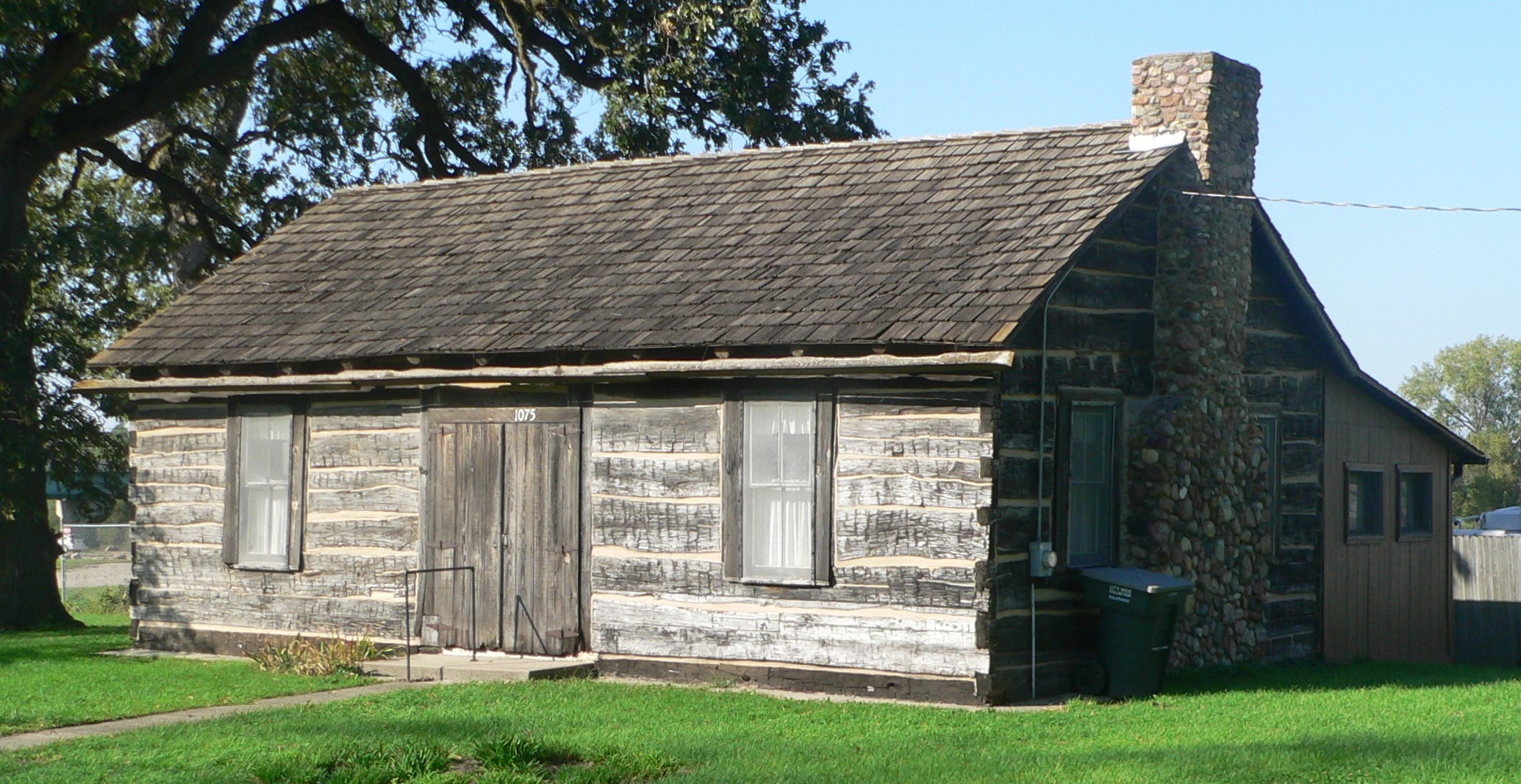

- Location within Iowa Location within the United States
- Location: Riverside Park; Sioux City, Iowa
- Coordinates: 42°29′48″N 96°28′30.7″W
- Area: less than one acre
- Built: c. 1860
- Built by: Theophile Bruguier
- NRHP reference No.: 00000918
- Added to NRHP: August 14, 2000

The Theophile Bruguier Cabin is a historic building located in Sioux City, Iowa, United States. Bruguier was a Quebec native who was a trader with the American Fur Company. He was the first Caucasian settler in what would become Sioux City. He settled at the confluence of the Missouri and the Big Sioux Rivers in 1849. With him were his two wives, Dawn and Blazing Cloud, and his father-in-law War Eagle, a chief of Yankton tribe, and extended family. He built a number of log structures on his 560-acre (230 ha) claim. Bruguier took up farming and set up his own fur-trading company. War Eagle and his two daughters, Bruguier's wives, died in the 1850s. Bruguier sold a tract of land to Joseph Leonnais in 1855, and it became the original townsite for Sioux City. He built this single-room cabin for his home about 1860, and married Victoria Brunette in 1862. Bruguier and his wife moved to a farm near Salix, Iowa, where he died in 1895.

In time, the cabin was covered with a wood veneer on the outside and plaster on the inside. It was discovered when the Rev. John Hantla of the Wall Street Mission was tearing it down. Workers from the Civil Works Administration dismantled the cabin and rebuilt it in Riverside Park in 1934. Two years later, it was dedicated as a memorial to the "friendly Indians of the Sioux nation who lived in peace with the early pioneers," and to "Theophile Bruguier, the first permanent white resident within the present boundary of Sioux City." The cabin was listed on the National Register of Historic Places in 2000.
