= Émile Fouchard =

French politician (1902–1996)

Émile Fouchard (20 February 1902 – 2 January 1996) was a French politician.

== Biography ==
Born in Bannay in the Cher department, in 1906 he moved with his family to Chelles in the Seine-et-Marne department. He became a carpenter and joined the Young Socialists in 1918. After the Tours Congress of 1920, Fouchard left the Socialists and joined the French Communist Party.

He first stood in the 1929 municipal elections in Chelles unsuccessfully for the Communists, but in 1935 was elected mayor of Chelles on a joint Socialist-Communist ticket. In 1936 he was elected to the French Chamber of Deputies to represent the Meaux district.

In September 1939, following the Molotov–Ribbentrop Pact, Fouchard left the Communists. The French Communist Party was banned following this but Fouchard, who had distanced himself from the Party, was not investigated. He asked to be allowed to rejoin the French Army and became one of the leading members in the new Union populaire française. Following France's defeat in the battle of France and the armistice with Nazi Germany, Fouchard was one of the 80 members of parliament who voted against granting extraordinary powers to Marshal Philippe Pétain on 10 July 1940.

Fouchard was removed from his post as mayor of Chelles in 1941. He moved to the Lot department in Vichy France where he became involved with the French Resistance in the left-wing, Communist-dominated FTP (Francs-Tireurs et Partisans). Fouchard was arrested by the Vichy government in August 1942 and spent the remainder of the occupation imprisoned, first at Cahors and then at Saint-Sulpice-la-Pointe.

Freed at the liberation of France in 1944, Fouchard served in the reconstituted French National Assembly but did not seek election in 1945. He returned to local government politics in 1953, elected on a non-Communist left-wing ticket, but retired for a second and final time from politics in 1959.

He died at Montfermeil near Paris aged 94. A memorial to Fouchard exists in the public park in Chelles named after him.
