= Paul Boulet =

French politician (1894–1982)

Mayor of Montpellier
- In office 1945–1953
- Preceded by: Paul Rimbaud
- Succeeded by: Jean Zuccarelli

Personal details
- Born: 8 September 1894 Marseille, France
- Died: 27 July 1982 (aged 87) Montpellier, France
- Party: Popular Republican Movement
- Education: University of Montpellier

Paul Marie Maurice Boulet (French: [pɔl bulɛ]; 8 September 1894 – 27 July 1982) was a French Christian democrat politician.

Paul Boulet was born in Marseille and raised in Béziers and Montpellier. He studied medicine at the University of Montpellier. He served in the French Army during the First World War, initially as a stretcher-bearer and later as a medical officer. He was captured late in the war and held as a prisoner of war in Germany. For his services he received the Croix de Guerre and was appointed a chevalier of the Légion d'honneur in 1920, becoming an officer of the order in 1944.

After the war he taught in the medical faculty at the University of Montpellier. In 1935 he was elected mayor of Montpellier but resigned office in 1937. In 1936 he gained election to the French Chamber of Deputies, where he sat as a member of the Young Republic League, representing the Hérault département.

On the outbreak of the Second World War Boulet rejoined the French Army, serving medical director of a military hospital. He received a second Croix de guerre for his service. Demobilised in June he was one of the 80 who voted against the grant of special powers to Philippe Pétain and the creation of the Vichy régime in July 1940.

Paul Boulet was mayor of Montpellier a second time from 1945 to 1953 and served on the city council until 1957. He was re-elected by the voters of Hérault in 1945 to the lower house of the French parliament, the National Assembly of France which replaced the earlier Chamber of Deputies in the Fourth French Republic, sitting with the Popular Republican Movement. He was unsuccessful in retaining his seat in 1951 and again failed to win election in 1956.
