= Achille Daroux =

French politician (1880–1953)

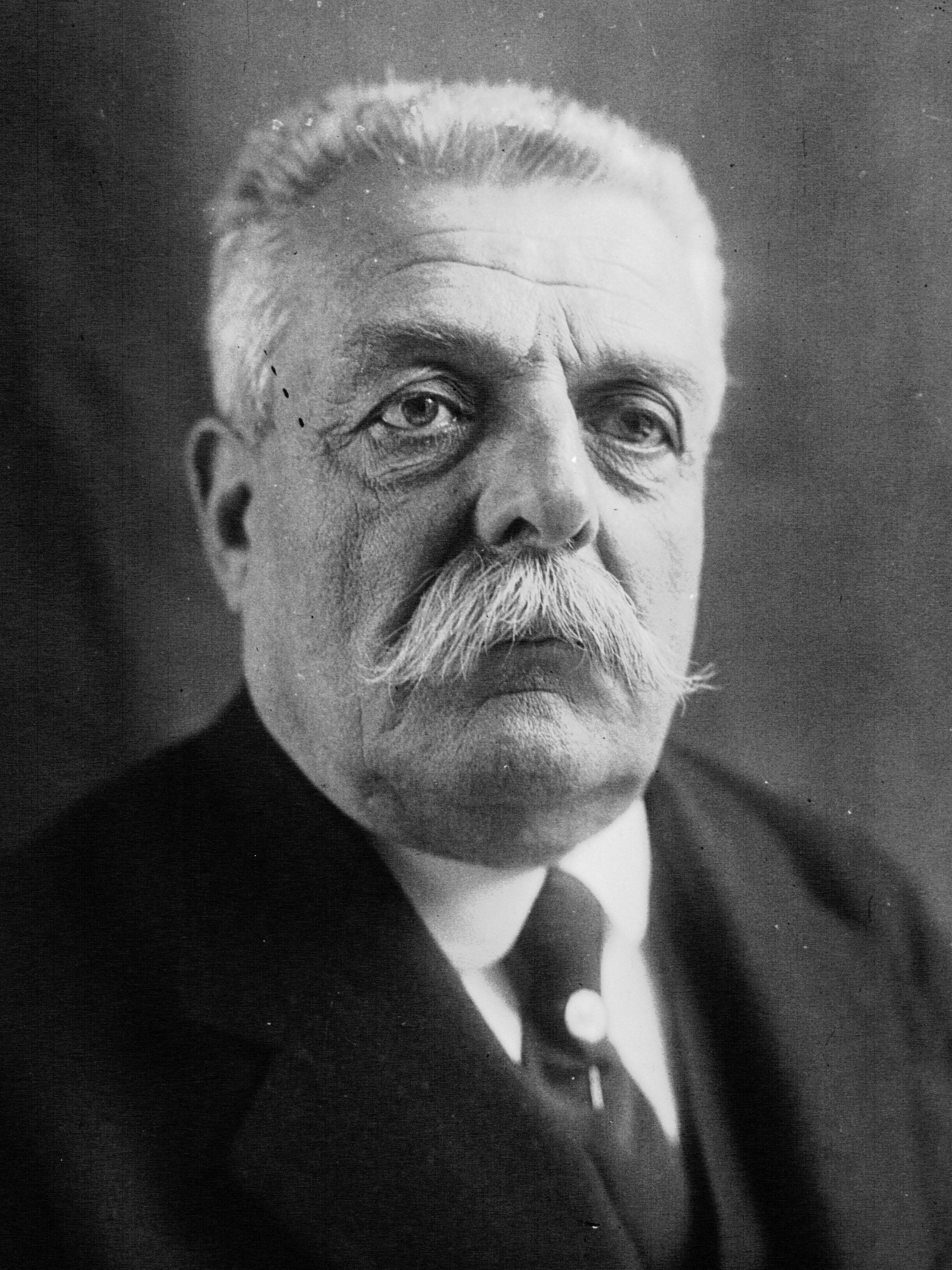
Achille Daroux in 1932

Achille Pierre Anatole Eugène Daroux (25 July 1880 – 25 April 1953) was a French politician.

Daroux was born in Saint-Prouant in the Vendée département of France. Son of a teacher, he studied medicine at the University of Bordeaux. He qualified as a doctor and practised medicine in the Vendée.

He was elected to the municipal council of Maillezais in 1904 and remained on the council until his death. From 1930 he served as mayor and in 1932 stood as a candidate for the Radical Party. He was elected to the Chamber of Deputies and re-elected in 1936. He served on the committees dealing with public health and with Postes, télégraphes et téléphones.

At the special session of the French parliament summoned to grant extraordinary powers to Marshal Philippe Pétain on 10 July 1940, Daroux was one of the 80 parliamentarians to vote against the measure. Daroux worked with the French Resistance during the war.

He was a chevalier of the Légion d'honneur.

== Bibliography ==
- Jean Jolly (dir.), Dictionnaire des parlementaires français, Presses universitaires de France
