= Social-National Party (France) =

Social-National Party Parti social-national
- Abbreviation: PSN
- Leader: Jean Hennessy
- Founded: April 1933
- Dissolved: 1936
- Merged into: Independent Left
- Ideology: Social democracy French nationalism Left-wing nationalism Federalism; Pan-Europeism; Anti-semitism
- Political position: Left-wing

The Social-National Party (French: Parti social-national, PSN) was a political party in France founded in the spring of 1933 by Jean Hennessy, a former cabinet minister. Hennessy, elected deputy for Nice in the Alpes-Maritimes was rarely active in the Independent Left parliamentary group. However, Hennessy was part of The Vichy 80 in 1940 which refused to give full powers to Marshal Philippe Pétain.

The Social-National Party dissolved in 1936.
