= Arthur Chaussy =

French politician (1880–1945)

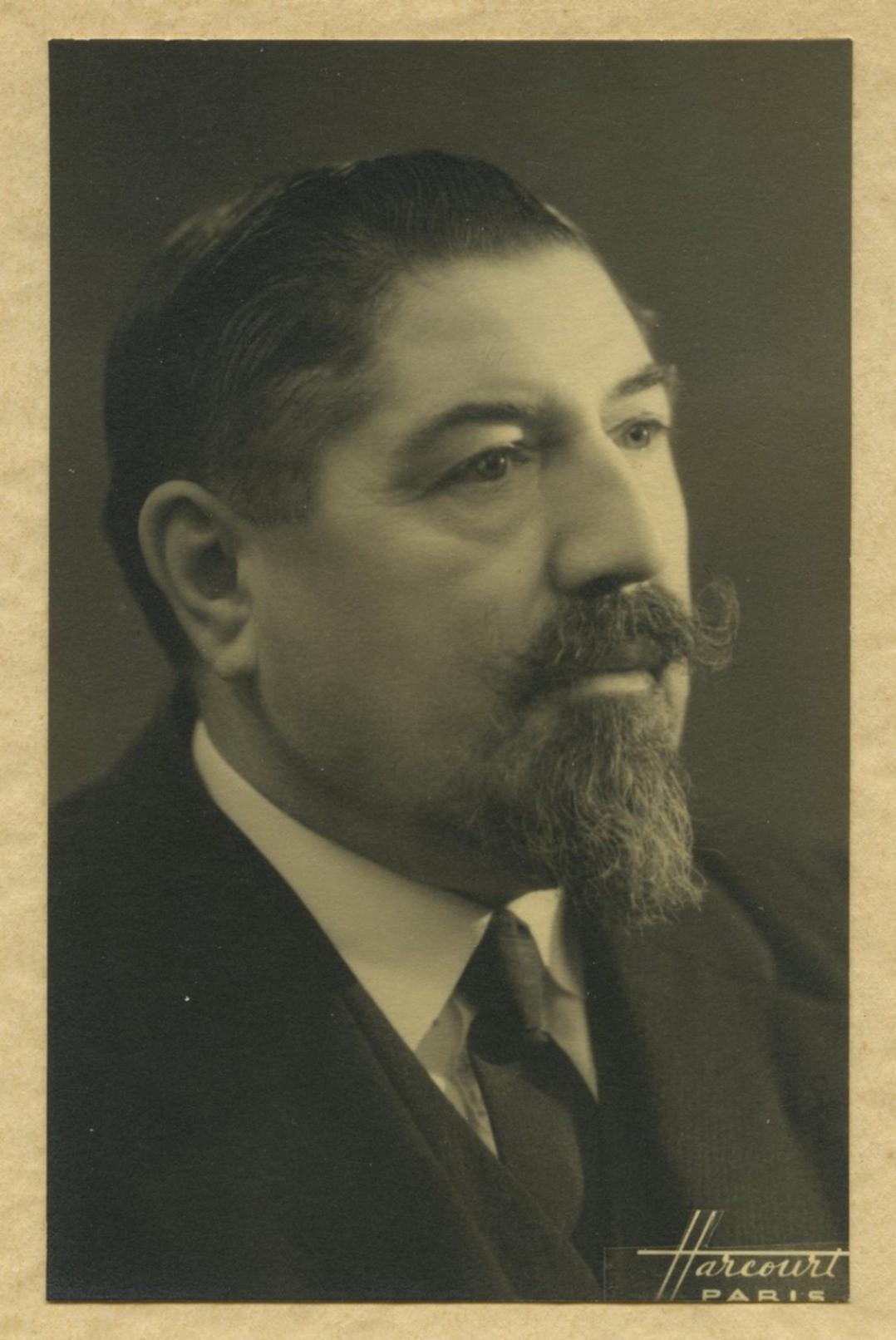
Arthur Chaussy, Photographic Portrait by Studio Harcourt

Arthur Théophile Chaussy (18 January 1880–28 December 1945) was a French politician.

Born into a peasant family in Château-Landon in the Seine-et-Marne department of France, Arthur Chaussy was a stonecutter to trade. In 1905 he was among the founding members of the Seine-et-Marne branch of the SFIO, the French socialist party. In 1911 he became secretary of the trades union federation of Seine-et-Marne. During the First World War he served with the French Army, was promoted to sergeant and received the Croix de guerre 1914–1918.

In the 1919 legislative elections he was elected to the French Chamber of Deputies, representing Seine-et-Marne and sitting with the SFIO. Re-elected in the 1924 legislative elections, he was defeated in the 1928 legislative elections, which returned to the old, pre-1919, single vote system. He returned to the chamber in the 1932 legislative elections.

During the Second World War, at the special session of the French parliament summoned to grant extraordinary powers to Marshal Philippe Pétain on 10 July 1940 Chaussy was one of the 80 parliamentarians to vote against the measure. He served as mayor of Brie-Comte-Robert from 1929 until his removal by Vichy.

Following the liberation of France, Chaussy was again mayor of Brie-Comte-Robert, and served as a conseiller général for the department of Seine-et-Marne. Albert Chaussy died at Melun on 28 December 1945. A school in the town of Brie-Comte-Robert is named for him.
