= Michel Bruguier =

French lawyer and resistance fighter

Michel Brugier
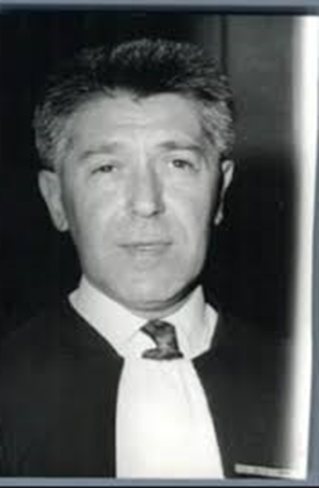
- Born: November 17, 1921; Carcassonne
- Died: March 16, 1967 (aged 45)

Michel Bruguier (17 November 1921 - 16 March 1967) was a French lawyer and resistance fighter.

== Early life and education ==
Michel Bruguier was born on November 17, 1921, in Carcassonne. He was the son of Georges Bruguier. Once he moved to Paris he joined the preparatory classes of the Lycée Henri-IV.

== Career ==
During World War II, Bruguier joined a combat network, becoming its departmental manager in July 1942. He was imprisoned from 1942 to 1943. Subsequently, freed, he was appointed as a regional inspector of the Mouvements Unis de la Résistance. He was later promoted to chief of the French Forces of the Interior of the Gard (under the wartime name of “Commandant Audibert”). Bruguier then joined the departmental liberation committee of Gard, as he had been a student there. He would later join the French Communist Party.

Bruguier studied law and plead several cases through his career; most notably the defense of Mehdi Ben Barka in company of René Thorp.

He died of a brain haemorrhage on March 16, 1967.

== Distinctions ==
- Legion of Honour
- Croix de Guerre 1939–1945
- Resistance Medal

== Gallery ==
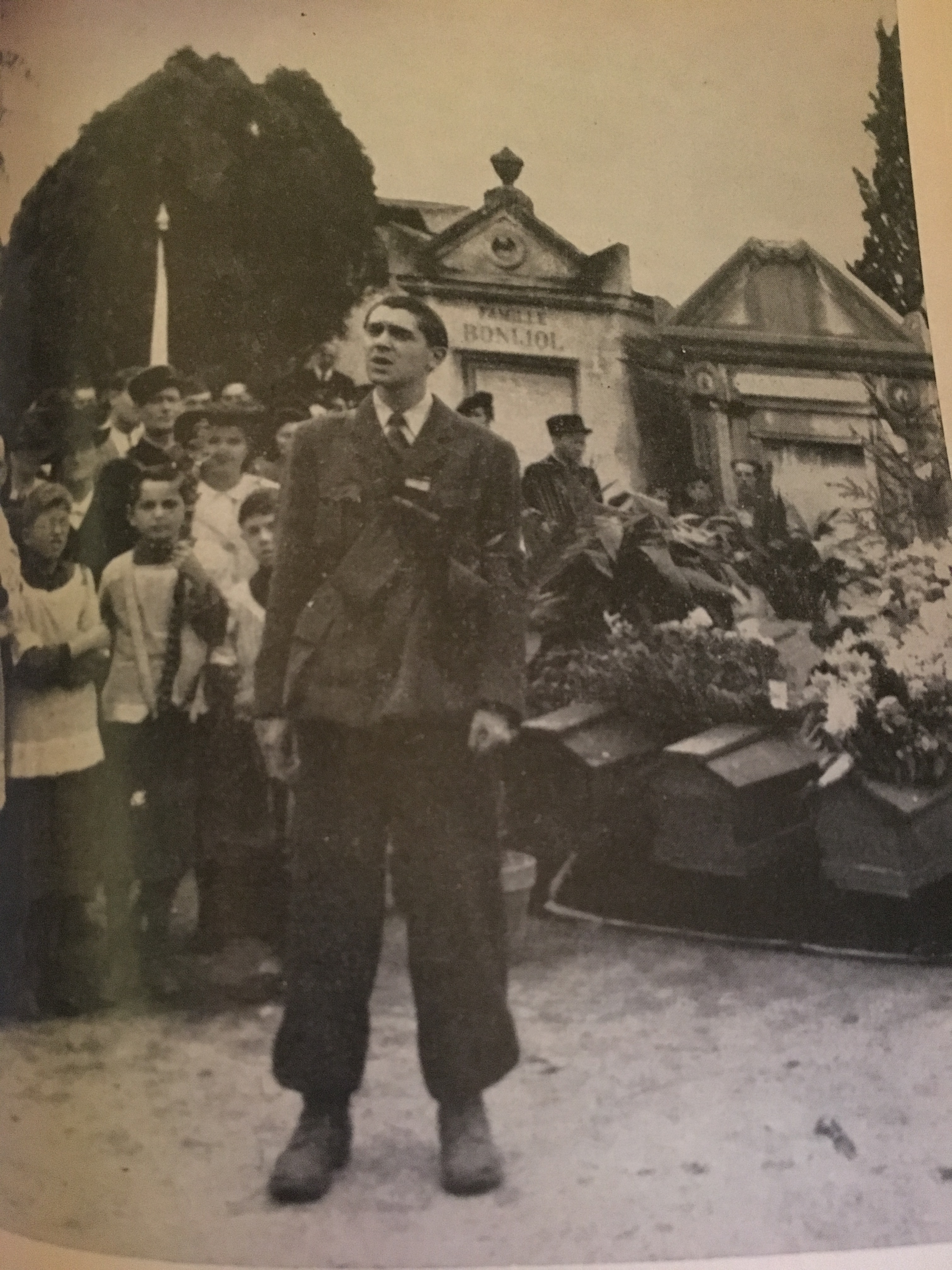
Bruguier at the burial of the martyrs at the pit of Célas, 18 September 1944

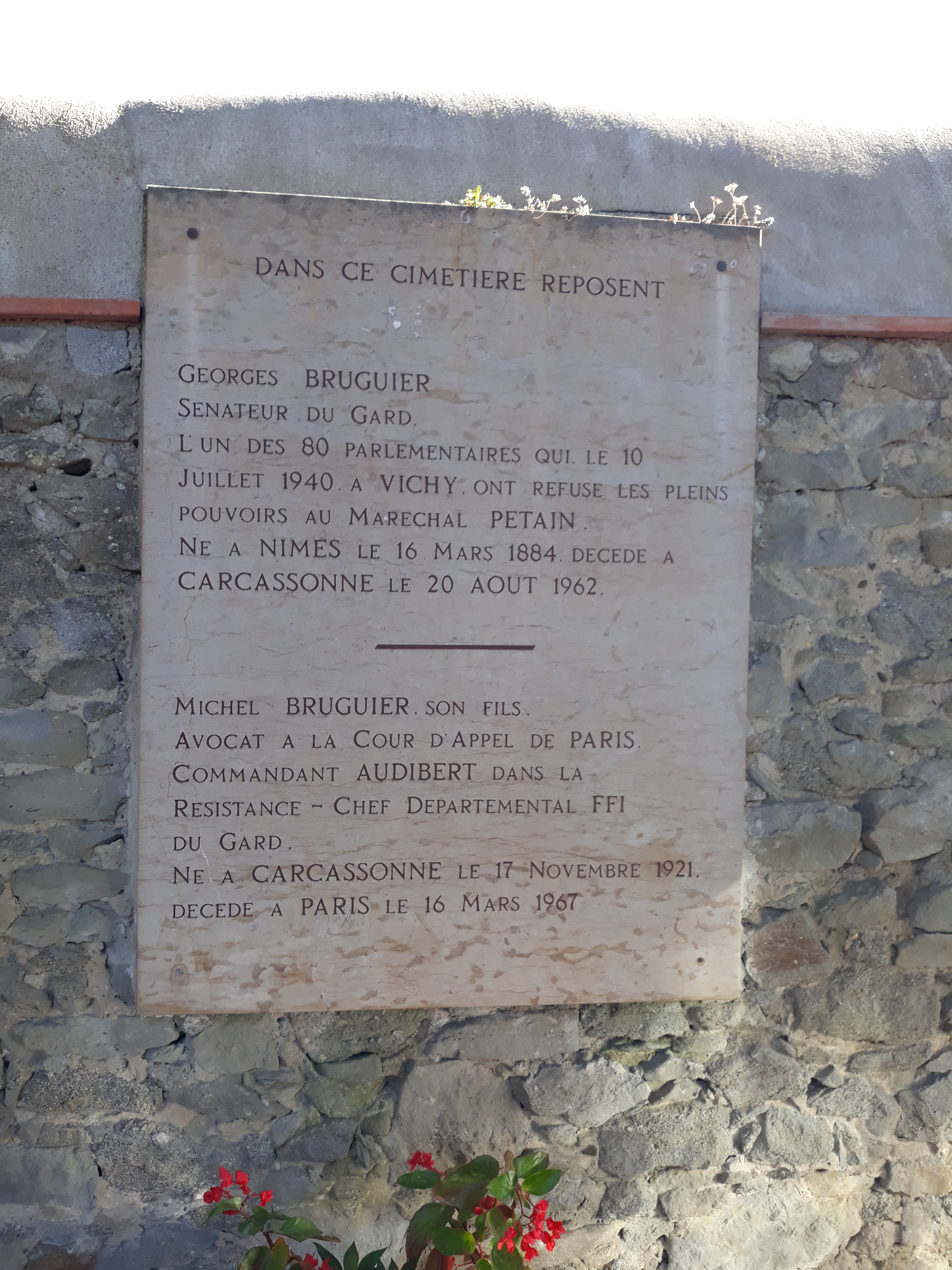
Commemorative plaque on the wall of the Citè du Carcassonne cemetery.

== Sources ==
- Boissard, Michel (2006). "Michel Bruguier". In Serge Velay (ed.). Visas pour le Gard : un siècle, un département (in French). Vauvert: Au diable Vauvert. ISBN 978-2-84626-101-2.
