= René Nicod =

French politician (1881–1950)

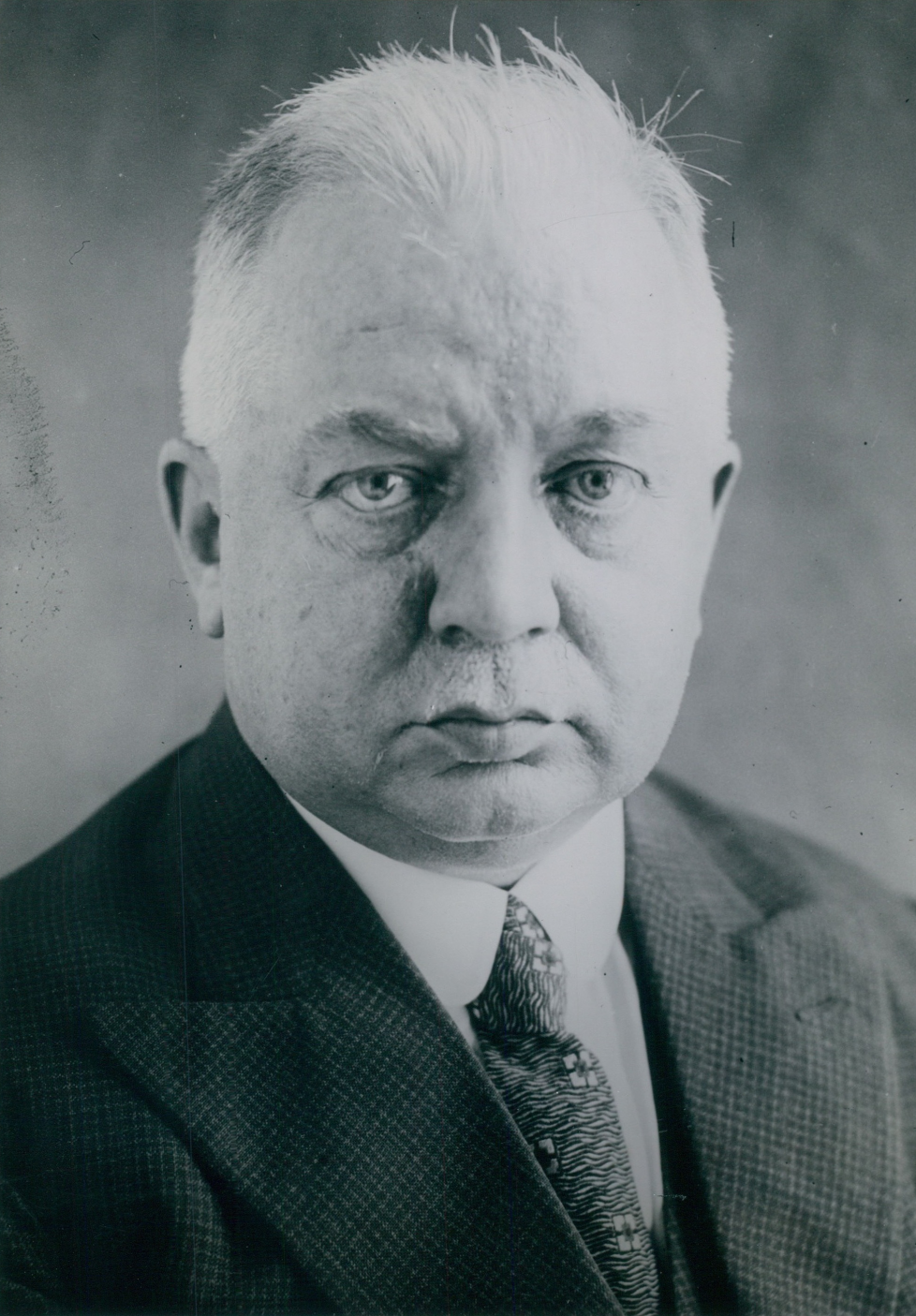

Mayor of Oyonnax
- In office 1947–1950

Member of the General Council of Ain for Oyonnax-Nord
- In office 1945–1950

Member of the Chamber of Deputies for Ain
- In office 1936–1942

Member of the General Council of Ain for Oyonnax-Nord
- In office 1928–1940

Member of the Chamber of Deputies for Ain
- In office 1919–1924

Mayor of Oyonnax
- In office 1919–1940

Personal details
- Born: 18 July 1881 Saint-Claude, French Third Republic
- Died: 14 March 1950 (aged 68) Oyonnax, French Fourth Republic
- Party: French Section of the Workers' International (1945–1950, 1912–1920); French Popular Union (1939–1945); French Communist Party (1920–1939)
- Spouse: Céline Buffaut Marie

Military service
- Allegiance: French Third Republic
- Branch/service: French Army
- Battles/wars: First World War; Western Front; Battle of Verdun (WIA); Battle of Hartmannswillerkopf
- Awards: Croix de guerre, palme de bronze Médaille militaire

René Nicod (18 July 1881 – 14 March 1950) was a French politician. He was mayor of Oyonnax from 1919 to 1940 and from 1947 to 1950.

== Biography ==
René Nicod was born René-Marius Nicod on 18 July 1881 in Saint-Claude, Jura, France. Nicod was orphaned at age 15, interrupting his studies at the College of Saint-Claude. He then worked a succession of jobs. Nicod was a supporter of the French Section of the Workers' International (SFIO); he became the party's secretary for the department of Ain in 1912. That year he served six days in prison for allegedly insulting the police.

Nicod was an antimilitarist and opposed the expansion of conscription under the 1913 "Three Year Law". Despite this, Nicod accepted being ordered to appear for military service in the First World War. He was initially assigned to the 23rd Infantry Regiment fighting at several battles in the Vosges. In 1916, Nicod was reassigned to the 320th Infantry Regiment. He took part in the Battle of Verdun, losing the use of his left hand during the fighting. He received the Médaille militaire and Croix de guerre for his service.

In 1919, Nicod was elected to the Chamber of Deputies, representing Ain. The same year he was also elected mayor of Oyonnax, a role he would hold until 1940.

At the Tours Congress in December 1920, Nicod became a founding member of the French Communist Party (PCF) although he did not accept all of the Twenty-one Conditions. In 1927, Nicod travelled to the Soviet Union; upon his return wrote a number of articles about the successes and problems of the young state. Nicod was defeated in both the 1924 and 1928 national elections, although he was elected to the General Council of Ain in 1928. He was re-elected to the Chamber of Deputies in the 1936 election.

In 1939, Nicod denounced the Molotov–Ribbentrop Pact. He therefore quit the French Communist Party, forming and chairing the French Popular Union, which was formed by communists who opposed the Pact. Despite having quit the French Communist Party, he disagreed with Prime Minister Édouard Daladier's decision to ban the party.

After France fell to German invasion in 1940, Nicod was one of The Eighty who voted against dissolving French democracy and giving dictatorial powers to Philippe Pétain. As a result, he was imprisoned in an internment camp in Évaux-les-Bains until he was freed by French Forces of the Interior in June 1944. He then joined the National Front and worked coordinating French Resistance activities in the Oyonnax area. He also became a member of the Provisional Consultative Assembly.

After the war, the French Communist Party refused to re-admit him. In July 1945, he re-joined the SFIO, after an absence of twenty-five years. He was re-elected to the posts he held prior to the war, being elected to the General Council of Ain in 1945, and Mayor of Oyonnax in 1947. He would hold both roles until his death in Oyonnax in 1950. His funeral was reportedly well-attended and featured a message from President Vincent Auriol.
