= Louis Noguères =

French politician (1881–1956)

Louis Noguères (4 October 1881 – 5 May 1956) was a French politician and member of the French Resistance.

Son of a magistrate, Louis Noguères was born at Laval, Mayenne. His family moved frequently and Louis attended schools in Laval, Angers, Chambéry, and Le Havre. He studied law and history at the Sorbonne in Paris. In Paris he met Jean Jaurès and collaborated with him on the sixth volume of L'Histoire de la Révolution et de l'Empire. Although supportive of socialism, Noguères did not join the French Section of the Workers' International (SFIO) at this time. Recalled to active service during the First World War, he served in the infantry and the air force, and received the Légion d'honneur.

He worked as a lawyer for many years before first standing for election as mayor of Thuir in the Pyrénées-Orientales in 1931. In 1935, now a member of the SFIO, he was reelected as mayor and was elected to the Chamber of Deputies in at the end of 1937.

On 10 July 1940, Louis Noguères was one of the eighty who voted against granting special powers to Marshal Philippe Pétain. Placed under police surveillance, he was ejected from the Chamber of Deputies in February 1941 when a letter which expressed his hostility to the Vichy Regime, Nazi Germany, and Fascism, was intercepted. He publicly expressed opposition to Vichy at the funeral of Senator Georges Pézières in March 1941, and was placed under house arrest, first Argentat in Corrèze, then at Florac in Lozère.

His activities came to the attention of the Gestapo, who decided to arrest him in the autumn of 1943. Forewarned by the resistance, he escaped and joined the Maquis in Aveyron where he contributed to resistance journals such as Le Populaire, Libération, and Vaincre.

After the liberation of France, Noguères was a member of the French National Assembly, and served as president of the High Court, presiding over trials of Vichy ministers and functionaries. He stepped down from the court in 1951. He also served as president of the General council from 1945 until his death.

He died at Bages. He was the father of Henri Noguères.

== Sources ==
- Jean Maitron (dir.), Dictionnaire biographique du mouvement ouvrier français, éd. de l'Atelier, cd-rom, 1997
- Louis Nogueres, Vichy, juillet 1940, Collection Pour une histoire du XXe siècle, Paris, Fayard, 2000, 156p.
