= Marcel Astier =

French politician (1885–1947)

- Born: Marcel-François Astier; 7 January 1885; Privas, France
- Died: 21 September 1947 (aged 62); Soyons, France
- Occupation: Politician

Marcel-François Astier (7 January 1885 – 21 September 1947) was a French politician.

== Life ==
Born in 1885, Marcel Astier was the son of parliamentarian François Astier. He studied law and medicine and managed the familial vineyards. This work led him into politics where he became a leader in several agricultural groups, including that devoted to the support of French sericulture.

He became mayor of Soyons and in 1924 was elected as for the Radical Party to the Chamber of Deputies representing Ardèche. He served only a single term, being defeated in 1928. In 1938 he was reelected, this time to the Senate.

He was among the eighty who voted against granting special powers to Marshal Philippe Pétain on 10 July 1940, ending his speech "Long live the Republic all the same!" («Vive la République quand même!»). He engaged in the French Resistance, reestablishing a clandestine organisation for the Radical Party in Ardèche. In 1943 he travelled to London, joining the Provisional Consultative Assembly established by the CFLN where he headed the agriculture commission.

After the liberation he stood in the 1945 elections but was not successful and retired from politics.

He died at his home in Soyons.
