= Gaston Cabannes =

French politician (1882–1950)

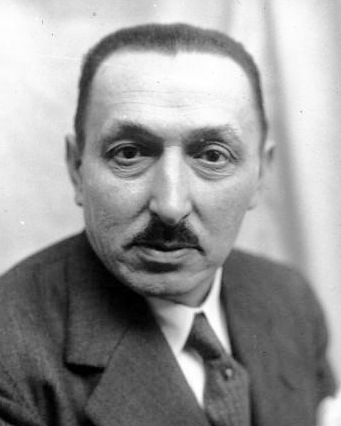
Gaston Cabannes in 1932

Gaston Marie Léon Cabannes (12 August 1882 – 9 November 1950) was a French politician.

Gaston Cabannes was born in Agen. His parents worked in the garment industry and he himself worked as a tailor in Bordeaux. An active trade unionist and a member of the French Section of the Workers' International (SFIO) (French socialist party), Cabannes first stood for election in 1924 on the list of the Cartel des Gauches but was unsuccessful. He was elected to the French Chamber of Deputies representing Bordeaux in the general election of 1932 and was re-elected in 1936. In 1935 he was elected mayor of Floirac.

In July 1940 during the Second World War he was one of the 80 members of the French parliament who voted against granting extraordinary powers to Marshal Philippe Pétain. As a consequence the Vichy régime dismissed him as mayor of Floirac.

He served as a member of the Haute Cour de justice, a special criminal court which is formed by the Court of Cassation to try cases of high treason, during the épuration légale which followed the end of the war.

He died in Bordeaux in 1950 aged 68.
