= Camille Rolland =

French politician

Camille Rolland was a French politician (medical doctor by training) born on November 10, 1875, in Chaponnay (then in the department of Isère, currently in Rhône). He died in 1964.

== Biography ==
Camille Rolland was elected municipal councilor of Brignais in 1908. He was then elected the mayor of this community in 1925, president of the Association of Maires of Rhône, and councilor.

He was elected to the Senate in 1927, and re-elected in 1936. He sat on the board of the Democratic Left. He was a member of the health commission during his two terms, and became the vice-president of this commission in 1935. From 1934 onwards, he also belonged to the commission of the army. He sat on the commission of the colonies from 1928 to 1938. Between 1933 and 1937, he was the secretary of the Senate.

Camille Rolland also joined the Inter-Parliamentary Union. Vice-president of the French group, he was unanimously elected president of the permanent commission on the study of social and humanitarian questions in April 1938.

On July 10, 1940, Camille Rolland voted against dissolving the Third Republic in favor of the Vichy regime led by Philippe Pétain.

== Decoration ==
- Cavalier of the Légion d'honneur

== Sources ==
- Jolly, Jean, "Rolland, Camille", Dictionnaire des parlementaires français (in French), Presses Universitaires de France
