= Alberto Murer =

Italian general

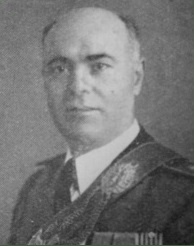
- Born: 13 December 1889; La Spezia, Kingdom of Italy
- Died: 7 October 1944 (aged 54); Flossenbürg, Nazi Germany
- Military career
- Allegiance: Kingdom of Italy
- Branch: Royal Italian Army
- Service years: 1910–1943
- Rank: Brigadier General
- Commands: 1st Heavy Artillery Regiment; Reserve Officer Cadets' School of Moncalieri; VIII G.a.F. Coverage Sector
- Conflicts: Italo-Turkish War; First Italo-Senussi War; World War I; White War; World War II; Battle of the Western Alps; Italian occupation of Yugoslavia
- Awards: Bronze Medal of Military Valor (twice); War Cross for Military Valor (twice); Order of the Crown of Italy

Alberto Murer (La Spezia, 13 December 1889 – Flossenbürg, 7 October 1944) was an Italian general during World War II.

== Biography ==
He was born in La Spezia on 13 December 1889, and graduated from the Royal Military Academy of Artillery and Engineers of Turin on 21 October 1910 with the rank of artillery second lieutenant, entering serving in the 11th Artillery Regiment. In 1912 he took part in the Italo-Turkish War and then in the subsequent First Italo-Senussi War, with the 1st Mountain Artillery Regiment, being awarded a Bronze Medal of Military Valor during a clash in Sidi Ulid on 21 May 1915. He returned to Italy after the start of the war with the Austro-Hungarian Empire, fighting on the Adamello, where he received another bronze medal and reached the rank of major in 1918.

After the end of the war he served in the 2nd Heavy Artillery Regiment, then in the 11th Artillery Regiment, and finally at the Artillery Command of the Alessandria Army Corps. He was promoted to lieutenant colonel on 16 May 1927, and after attending the first higher course of ballistics in Turin, from 1930 to 1934, he was a teacher of explosives and aggressive chemicals at the Application School of Artillery and Engineers in Turin. From 1934 to 1936 he taught weapons and shooting at the Reserve Officer Cadets' School of Moncalieri, where he was also deputy commander of the school. He was then given command of the 1st Heavy Artillery Regiment (dependent on the 1st Army Corps of Turin) and promoted to colonel on 1 January 1937; on 1 November he assumed command of the Officer Cadets' School of Moncalieri. During the 1930s he also wrote a number of books on artillery and explosives.

From 1 September 1938 he was appointed commander of the VIII Coverage Sector of the Guardia alla Frontiera in Bardonecchia. From 15 May 1941 he became acting commander of the artillery of the VI Army Corps, stationed in Dubrovnik, and full commander on 1 January 1942 when he was promoted to brigadier general. On 15 May 1943 he was replaced by General Vincenzo Catalano and repatriated; after a short period at the disposal of the territorial defense of Genoa for special assignments, he was given command of the "Duca degli Abruzzi" Barracks, located in the Jocteau Castle on the Beauregard hill, near Aosta, where the Central Military School of Mountaineering was located.

After the armistice of Cassibile he remained at his post, ostensibly joining the newly established Italian Social Republic, but in reality he collaborated with the National Liberation Committee and devised a plan for the mass defection to the Resistance of the Alpini of the 7th Provincial Military Command (Aosta) of the National Republican Army. The plan was discovered, however, and on the night of 18–19 June 1944 a battalion of SS with some soldiers of the Republican National Guard broke into the Duca degli Abruzzi barracks and arrested all those present, eight officers (including Murer) and 236 non-commissioned officers and soldiers. The latter were sent to Germany as Italian military internees, whereas Murer and the other officers were referred to the Extraordinary Military Tribunal of Turin, initially held in the San Vittore prison in Milan and later sent to Flossenbürg concentration camp on 6 September 1944, with Transport 81. Only two of the officers survived captivity; General Murer died at Flossenbürg on 7 October 1944. According to a surviving Flossenbürg prisoner, Giannantonio Agosti, Murer died from the wounds he had suffered at the hands of a kapo, who had savagely beaten him for hiding some potatoes. His body was burned in the camp's crematorium.
