= Émile Bender =

French politician

Émile Joseph Louis Bender (6 September 1871 – 26 March 1953) was a French politician.

Émile Bender was born in Charentay in the Rhône département where his father was a wine grower. Educated in Lyon, he studied and practised law in the city while continuing the family wine business.

A member of the Radical Party, Bender became mayor of Odenas in 1901 and was elected to the Chamber of Deputies in 1907 in a by-election and again in 1914 in the general election. He served on several committees in the Chamber, including those concerned with labour, judicial reforms, the budget, and the commission dealing with civil and criminal legislation which he chaired.

He failed to be re-elected in 1919, was successful in 1924 and again failed in 1928. In 1931 he was elected to the French Senate where he served on the commerce committee, later acting as the vice-president and president of the committee.

In June 1940, he was one of the 80 who voted against the grant of special powers to Philippe Pétain and the creation of the Vichy régime. Following the creation of the Vichy régime he retired from politics. In his final years he lived in Nice where he died in 1953.
