= Camille Vallin =

French politician

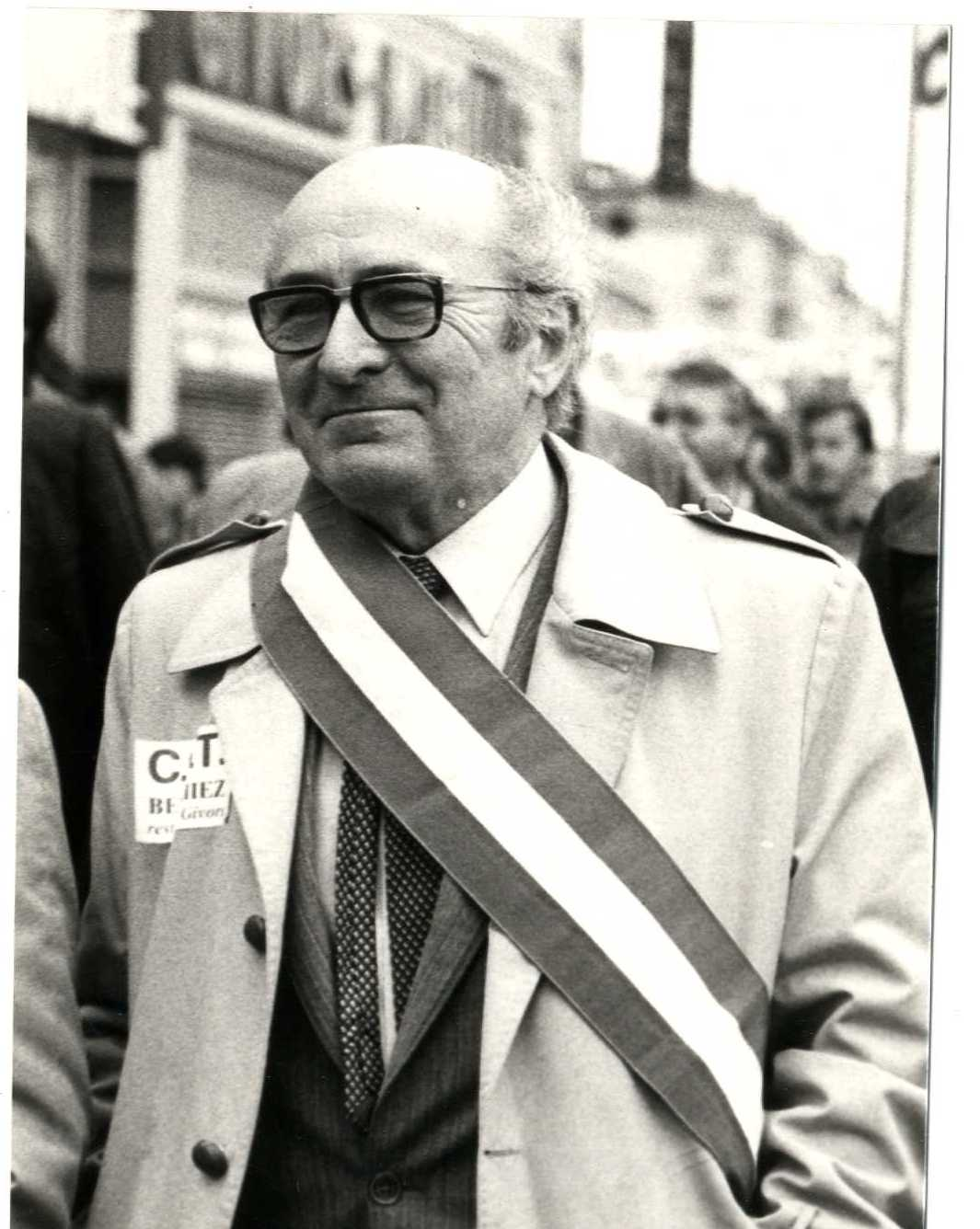

Camille Vallin (22 November 1918, in Givors – 9 August 2009) was a French politician. He represented the French Communist Party in the National Assembly from 1956 to 1958 and in the Senate from 1959 to 1968 and from 1977 to 1986. He was the mayor of Givors from 1953 to 1993.

== See also ==
· · ·
