= Jean-Jacques Pignard =

French politician

Jean-Jacques Pignard (born April 1947 in Villefranche-sur-Saône, Rhône) is a French politician and a member of the Senate of France. He represents the Rhône department and is a member of the New Centre. He replaces Michel Mercier, who resigned his Senate seat to join cabinet. He was previously mayor of Villefranche.

On July 24, 2009, he became Senator for the Rhône, replacing Michel Mercier who was appointed to the government. He is a member of the Union Centrist group. On June 16, 2012, he resigned from the Senate following Michel Mercier's end of ministerial duties, when he returned to the High Assembly.

He returned to the Senate on April 23, 2014, following Michel Mercier's resignation. His term of office ends on the following September 30, following the senatorial elections in which he did not stand for re-election.
