= Union populaire française =

1939 French parliamentary group

The Union populaire française (UPF, English: "French Popular Union") was a parliamentary group in the French Parliament formed in 1939 by breakaway members of the French Communist Party who opposed the Molotov–Ribbentrop Pact. Prominent members included Émile Fouchard, Eugène Jardon and René Nicod.
