= War Eagle (Dakota Leader) =

Native American Tribal Chief (1785-1851)

- (Dakota: Waŋbdí Okíčhize, or Huya-na ("Little Eagle")
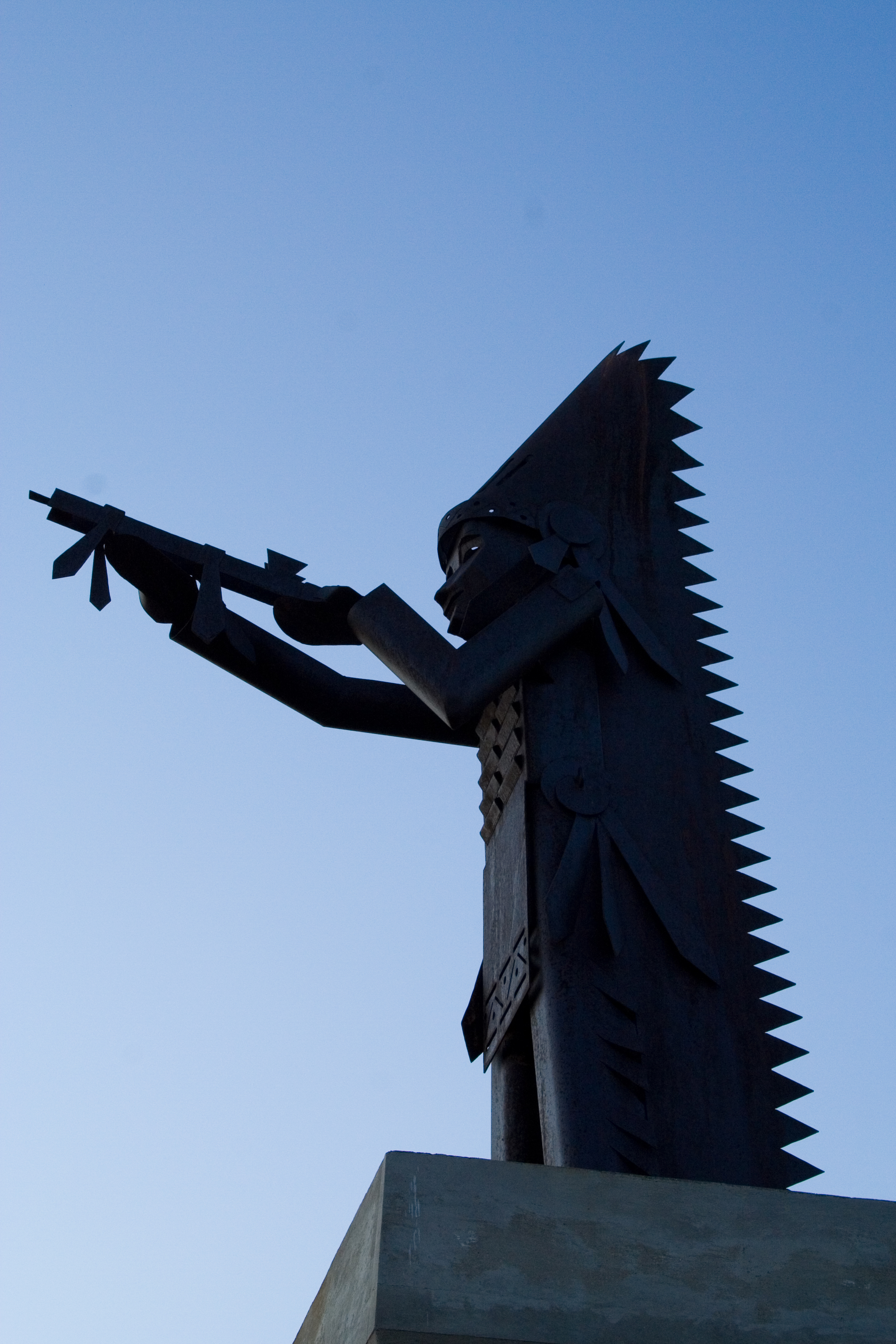
- War Eagle Monument, Sioux City, IA, overlooking the Missouri River

Santee, leader

Personal details
- Born: c. 1785 Present day Minnesota or Wisconsin
- Died: Autumn 1851 Confluence of the Big Sioux and Missouri
- Spouse: Two wives
- Children: Daughters, Dawn and Blazing Cloud, married to Theophile Bruguier; two other daughters, three sons

War Eagle (Dakota: Waŋbdí Okíčhize; c. 1785 - Autumn 1851) was a Dakota-born tribal chief of the Yankton Sioux Tribe.

== Life ==
Little is known of War Eagle's early life in regard to his birthplace and the dating of his birth, however historians estimate that he was born around 1785 in present-day Minnesota or Wisconsin. In his early years, War Eagle left his own tribe, the Santee, to avoid bloodshed in a fight as to who would be chief.

As a young man, War Eagle spent considerable time working among the white Americans. During the War of 1812, he carried messages for the United States government, and worked among the native peoples to promote the cause of the United States against the British. He worked as a riverboat guide on the upper Mississippi and also served as a messenger for the American Fur Company on the Missouri.

After marrying in Minnesota around 1830, he was adopted into the Yankton Sioux tribe. He and his wife had four girls and three boys. By the mid-1830s, he had been elected a chief of the tribe, and traveled to Washington, D.C., with other tribal leaders to negotiate peace treaties. War Eagle was especially proud of a silver Peace Medal given to him by President Martin Van Buren in 1837.

Two of his daughters, Dawn and Blazing Cloud, married Theophile Bruguier, a trader with the American Fur Company who had also been accepted into the Yankton tribe and had traveled with them for several years. According to one tradition, Bruguier told War Eagle about a dream he had of a place where two mighty rivers joined near a high bluff. War Eagle told Bruguier he had been to that place and would show it to him. In fact, both men had likely passed by this place many times in their fur trading voyages between St. Louis, Missouri and Fort Pierre.

Bruguier claimed the land near the confluence of the Big Sioux and Missouri rivers. In 1849, he built a log cabin, and with his two wives settled the land and traded with the Indians. His house is considered the first white settlement in what would shortly become Sioux City, Iowa.

Sometime during autumn in 1851, War Eagle died and was buried on top of the high bluff overlooking the confluence of the Big Sioux and Missouri. Other members of his family are also buried there, including Dawn and Blazing Cloud.

== Legacy ==
Today, the bluff is part of War Eagle Park in Sioux City, Iowa. A monument was constructed in his honor with a steel statue depicting him with the eagle feather bonnet and ceremonial pipe, symbolizing his brave leadership and his commitment to peace. Housing projects on the east base of the bluff also bear his name.
