= Camille Bedin =

French politician (1893–1979)

Camille Fernand Bedin (18 January 1893 – 7 February 1979) was a French politician.

== Biography ==
Camille Bedin was born at Saint-Satur in the Cher département. He worked as a cloth merchant. During the First World War he served in the French Army as a junior officer in the 50th Infantry Regiment. After the war he settled in Excideuil. He received the Légion d'honneur in 1925 for his services during the war and was active in the Fédération ouvrière et paysanne des anciens combattants, a veterans association.

He was a member of the French Section of the Workers' International (SFIO), the French socialist party, and was elected to represent Périgueux in the Chamber of Deputies in 1936. The next year he was elected as a general councillor (conseiller général) for Excideuil. In the Chamber of Deputies he served on the Navy committee and the Commerce and Industry committee.

In June 1940, he was one of the 80 who voted against the grant of special powers to Philippe Pétain and the creation of the Vichy régime. This, together with the fact that he was a Freemason, led to his dismissal as general councillor for Excideuil in January 1942.

Bedin was active in the French Resistance and was a member of the Comité d'action socialiste, the clandestine form of the banned SFIO. He headed Libération-sud in the départements of Dordogne and Corrèze. He was arrested by the Gestapo on 8 October 1943 and deported to Flossenbürg concentration camp, later being moved to a camp in German-occupied Czechoslovakia. He later received the Médaille de la Résistance for his services and was made a commander of the Légion d'honneur.

On being freed in 1945 he returned to France where he sat in the Provisional Consultative Assembly. He failed to win re-election as conseiller général in October 1945 and did not stand for election to the new National Assembly. He served as mayor of Excideuil until he retired from politics altogether in 1957 following the death of his wife.

== References and further reading ==
- Guillame, Sophie; Lachaise, Bernard, eds. (1998), Dictionnaire des parlementaires d'Aquitaine sous la Troisième République (in French), Bordeaux: Presses Universitaire de Bordeaux, ISBN 978-2-86781-231-6
- Jolly, Jean (1960). "Dictionnaire des Parlementaires français 1889-1940" (in French). Presses Universitaires de France.
