= Théophile Bruguier =

Canadian fur trader (1813–1896)

Theophile Bruguier, c. 1870

Theophile Bruguier (August 31, 1813 – February 18, 1896) was a French-Canadian fur trader with the American Fur Company. Bruguier is credited as being the first white settler of what would become Sioux City, Iowa.

== Early life ==
Bruguier was born at L'Assomption near Montreal, Canada on August 31, 1813. His parents were Elizabeth Kipp from England and French-Canadian Jean Bruguier. He studied law and began to practice as an attorney. He soon became engaged, but his fiancée died from cholera, and Bruguier then left Quebec on October 12, 1835.

== Fur trader ==
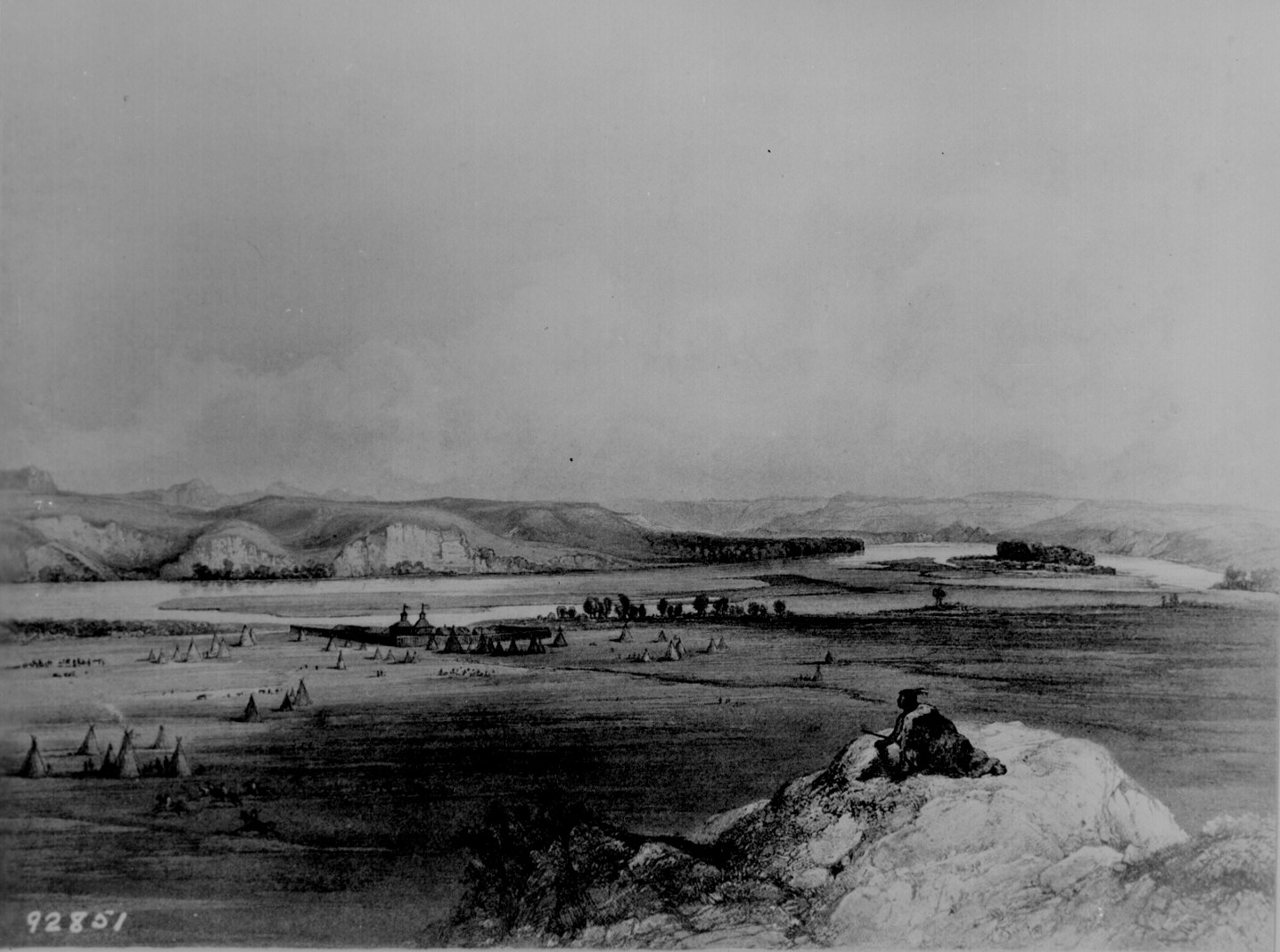
Fort Pierre during the 1830s

Bruguier arrived in St. Louis on November 15, 1836. He spoke French and English and became an interpreter and fur trader with the American Fur Company, working in the Missouri River area. On January 13, 1836, he arrived for his next assignment for the fur company at Fort Pierre, in what would later be Dakota Territory, where he learned the Dakota language of the Sioux Indians. He befriended Yankton Sioux Chief War Eagle. (Note: One source states that he arrived at Fort Pierre on January 1, 1836.) Bruguier became an independent fur trader and helped to settle tensions between white settlers and Native Americans.

== Settlement in Iowa ==
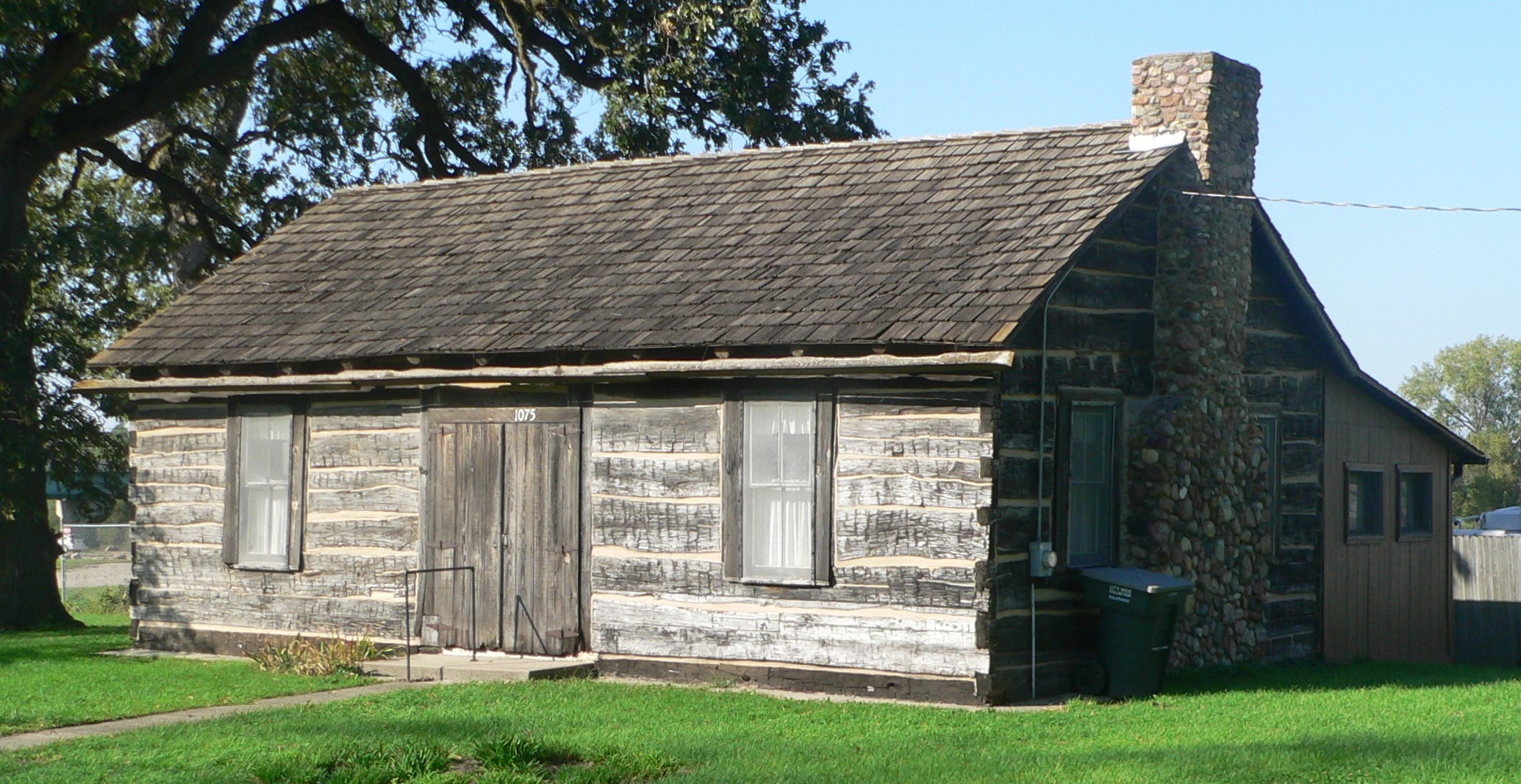
Theophile Bruguier Cabin, listed on the National Register of Historic Places

Bruguier established a farm and trading post in 1849 at the confluence of the Big Sioux River and Missouri River, along with War Eagle and his family members. His original homestead claim extended from the Big Sioux to the Floyd River, land that became the original town of Sioux City, a French settlement, about 1852. Bruguier continued in the trade business, and was a wagon freighter and an Indian commissioner. In August 1853, he was one of 17 people to vote in the first election in Woodbury County.

== Personal life ==
He married two daughters of War Eagle, Dawn and Flaming Cloud. He fathered thirteen children with them. By the late 1850s, both of his wives had died. He met a widow, Victoria Turnott, during a visit to St. Louis. They married and she returned with him to Sioux City. In the 1860s, they settled on a 500-acre (2.0 km^{2}) farm in the Salix, Iowa area. On February 18, 1896, Bruguier died from pneumonia. He was interred at the Catholic cemetery near Salix. In 1926, he was re-buried near the grave of his first two wives and War Eagle.
