= Independent Left (France) =

The Independent Left (French: Gauche indépendante, GI) was a French parliamentary group in the Chamber of Deputies of France of the French Third Republic during the interwar period. It was not a political party but a technical group formed by independents and parties too small to form their own parliamentary group, including dissidents from the Communist, Socialist and Radical-Socialist parties, as well as left-wing regional parties and left-wing Catholics.

It provided a home to those republican independents and small parties who supported the Cartels des Gauches and the Popular Front. As such, its exact membership changed from legislature to another. It was thus similar but distinct to the right-of-centre Independents of the Left group, which gathered up the independents and small parties who in temperament were similar to the right wing of the Radical-Socialists and the centre-right Radical Left, but who refused to support the Cartel and Popular Front.

== Legislature of 1932 to 1936: the Cartel des Gauches ==
The following parties and independents sat in as the Left Independent technical group between 1932 and 1936:

Surname	Forename	Political Party (if applicable)
BERON	Emile	Communist Party of Alsace-Lorraine
CHATENET	Henri	independent
CHAUVEL	Georges	independent
DAHLET	Camille	Alsatian Progressive Party
DELOM-SORBE	Maurice	Jeune République
DEUDON	Paul	independent
DOEBLÉ	Victor	Communist Party of Alsace-Lorraine
LA CHAMBRE	Guy	independent Radical
MOURER	Jean-Pierre	Communist Party of Alsace-Lorraine
MOUTET	Georges	independent Radical
PRENTOUT	Richard	independent Radical
RENAITOUR	Jean-Michel	independent Socialist Republican
SABIANI	Simon	independent socialist
THEBAULT	Léon	independent
TORRES	Henry	independent socialist

== Legislature of 1936 to 1940: the Popular Front ==
The Independent Left group's most famous incarnation existed between 1936 and 1940, when the following small parties sat in it:

- Party of Proletarian Unity (PUP), dissident communist;
- Frontist Party (PF), a party formed by antifascist Radical-Socialists.
- Radical-Socialist Party Camille Pelletan (PRS-CP), a party formed by antifascist Radical-Socialists.
- Former members of the Republican-Socialist Party who did not join the Socialist Republican Union (USR)
- Progressive Party, the federalist counterpart to the Radical-Socialist Party, before its decision to sit with the other Alsatian regionalist parties in 1936.
- Social-National Party (PSN), a small party founded by Jean Hennessy.
- League of the Young Republic (LJR), a social-Catholic pacifist party.

== See also ==
- Technical group
- Independent politician
- History of the Left in France
- Independents of the Left
- Independent Left (Italy)
