= James Hennessy (politician) =

French naval officer, politician and businessman

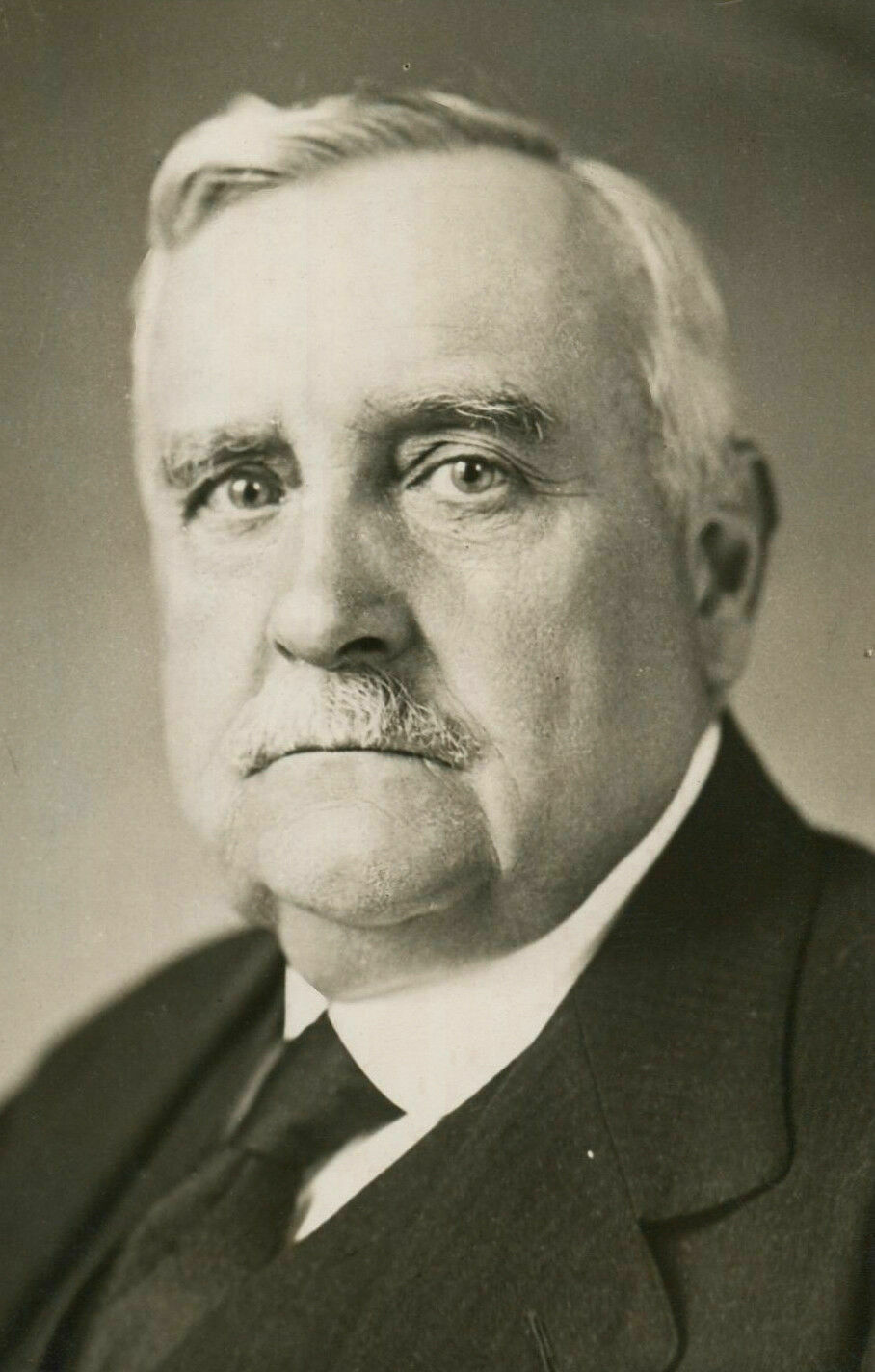

Member of the Chamber of Deputies
- In office 8 July 1906 – 9 January 1921

Member of the Senate
- In office 9 January 1921 – 16 May 1945

Personal details
- Born: James Richard Charles Hennessy; 26 July 1867 Cherves, Charente, France
- Died: 16 May 1945 (aged 77) Paris, France
- Spouse: Alice Hennessy (after 1893)
- Relatives: Jean Hennessy (brother)
- Education: Collège Stanislas de Paris, École navale
- Profession: Naval officer, businessman, politician

Military service
- Allegiance: France
- Branch/service: Navy
- Rank: Corvette captain
- Battles/wars: World War I
- Awards: Croix de guerre

James Richard Charles Hennessy (26 July 1867 – 16 May 1945) was a French naval officer, politician, businessman and equestrian.

== Personal life ==
Hennessy was born on 26 July 1867 in Cherves, a member of the Hennessy cognac family. He married Alice Hennessy, his first cousin, in 1893; they had five children. He died in Paris on 16 May 1945.

== Military career ==
Hennessy attended the École navale, before embarking on a career in the French Navy. Having left the navy in 1893, he was mobilised during World War I. He rose to the rank of corvette captain and was awarded the Croix de guerre.

== Business interests ==
Upon leaving the navy in 1893, Hennessy joined the family business.

In 1907 Hennessy had a five-story estate built at 46 Rue de Bassano which would be sold by the family after his death and become the five-star hotel: La Clef Champs-Élysées.

== Politics ==
Hennessy began his political career as a general councillor for Segonzac, Charente in 1895. He was elected as a deputy for Charente in 1906, succeeding Gustave d'Ornano, who had died shortly after the general election. He was re-elected in 1910, 1914 and 1919. In 1921, he was elected to the senate, where he sat until his death in 1945.

Hennessy also served as deputy mayor of Cognac until 1929. Several of his relatives, including his brother Jean also had careers in politics.

== Equestrian ==
Hennessy had a keen interest in horses. As a breeder of racehorses, he won the Grand National with Lutteur III in 1909, and the Grand Steeple-Chase de Paris with Lord Loris in 1914.

Hennessy competed in the mail coach event at the 1900 Summer Olympics.
