= Michel Zunino =

French wine grower and politician

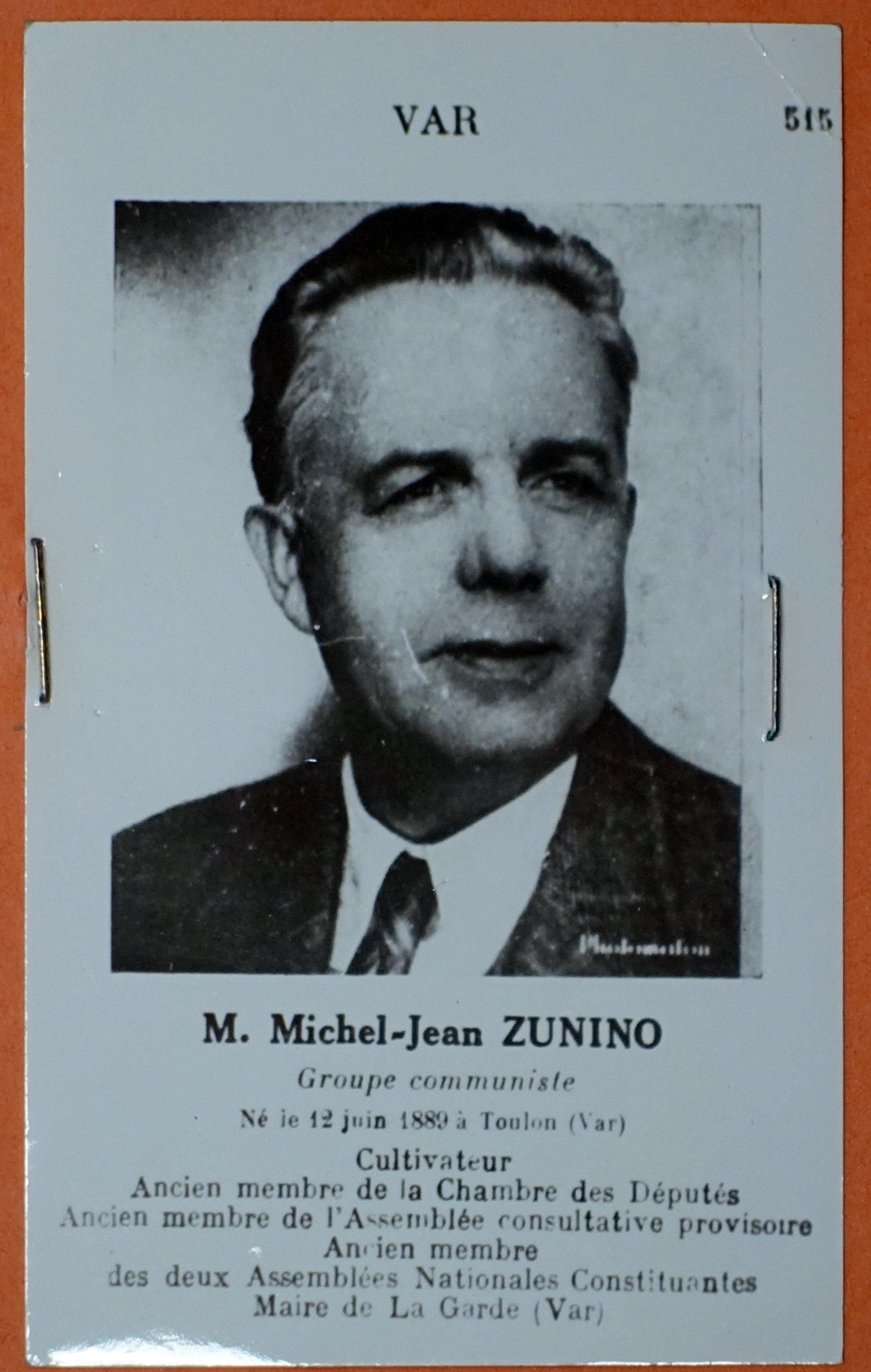
- Born: June 12, 1889; Toulon
- Died: April 26, 1958 (aged 68); La Garde

Michel Zunino (June 12, 1889 – April 26, 1958), Knight of the Légion d'honneur, was a French wine grower and politician. Zunino was a Member of Parliament, representing Var from 1936 to 1942 and 1946 to 1956. Additionally, he represented Var in the first and second Constituent National Assemblies after the war. He was also active in the cooperative movement amongst wine growers.

== Socialist politician ==
Zunino served in the First World War, and achieved the rank of captain in the artillery. He was injured twice in the war. In 1931 Zunino became mayor of La Garde. He became general councilor in 1934. In 1935 he ran for the a seat in the Senate on the list of the French Section of the Workers' International (SFIO), but without getting elected. After the election he became vice president of the General Council.

In the 1936 election he was elected to the National Assembly, with 7,894 votes. He became a member of the Agriculture and Marine commissions. In the National Assembly, he presented a proposal for a law to provide credits for flood victims in Var.

== War and resistance ==
On July 10, 1940, he became one of the Vichy 80, i.e., the eighty parliamentarians that voted against handing over the power of the state to Marshal Philippe Pétain. He was one of four parliamentarians from Var to do so. All four of them participated in the resistance during the war. Zunino joined the National Front (FN), and became a member of Southern Zonal Committee of FN. His son, Roger Zunino, was also a resistance fighter. Michel Zunino was expelled from SFIO in 1944. A few months later he joined the French Communist Party (PCF).

== In the Communist Party ==
Zunino became honorary president of the United Movement of the French Resistance (MURF). He also became a member of the Federal Bureau of PCF. He was elected mayor of La Garde and member of the National Assembly as a communist candidate. Zunino was the sole former Popular Front parliamentarian from SFIO who later was re-elected to parliament as a communist candidate.
