= Séraphin Buisset =

French politician (1870–1949)

Séraphin Léopold Buisset (10 June 1870 – 9 January 1949) was a French politician.

Séraphin Buisset was born in Rives in the Isère department and was a wine merchant there. He was elected as a conseiller général in 1907 and to the town council of Rives in 1912. In the 1914 general election he and was elected to the French Chamber of Deputies where he sat with the French Section of the Workers' International (SFIO) (French socialist party) and held his seat constantly thereafter until 1940. He was elected mayor of Rives in 1919 and again held the office without interruption until removed in 1941.

In July 1940 Buisset was among the 80 members of the French Parliament who voted against the grant of special powers to Philippe Pétain and the creation of the Vichy régime. In consequence he was removed from his offices.

Buisset died in Rives in 1949 and is buried there. A street in the town is named in his honour.
