= Louis Munier =

French politician

senator of the Rhône department
- In office 1882–1896

Personal details
- Born: 21 November 1821; Gex, Ain
- Died: 7 July 1896; Paris

Louis Munier (21 November 1821 in Gex, Ain – 7 July 1896 in Paris) was a French politician.

He was a city councillor, then a first deputy mayor in Lyon. From 1882 to 1896, he was a senator of the Rhône department within the Republican Union group. He was also the mayor of Beausemblant, Drôme, where he is buried.

In 1850, he married Marie Vinay in Beausemblant. They had two children: Paul Munier, who was admitted to the Court of Appeal of Lyon, and Jeanne Munier, who married Adrien Audibert, a law professor in Lyon and then Paris.

== Sources ==
- "Louis Munier", in Adolphe Robert and Gaston Cougny, Dictionnaire des parlementaires français (1789-1891), Bourloton, Paris, 1889 Edition details Wikisource
- Jean Jolly (dir.), Dictionnaire des parlementaires français, Presses universitaires de France (in French)
