= Georges Pézières =

French politician (1885 - 1941)

Georges Pézières (2 May 1885, in La Boissière – 1 March 1941, in Perpignan) was a French politician.

== Life ==
The son of a primary school teacher, Pézières a professor of letters at the collège in Perpignan. He joined the SFIO in 1924 and the following year was elected a municipal counsellor for Perpignan. In 1928 he became the mayor's second assistance. He lost the 1929 election but even so became secretary to the SFIO federation for the Pyrénées-Orientales, a post he held until 1935 and which culminated in his appointment as section secretary for Perpignan in 1934.

In 1931 and 1937 he was elected a general counsellor for Saint-Paul-de-Fenouillet. In March 1935 he was re-elected as a municipal counsellor then, in October that year, he was elected senator. In the 1930s he became the main collaborator of Jean Payra.

On 10 July 1940 he voted against granting full powers to Philippe Pétain. He died in 1941 and his funeral was the occasion Louis Noguères chose to come out publicly as an opponent of the Vichy regime.

== Sources ==
- "Georges Pézières", in Dictionnaire des parlementaires français (1889-1940), Jean Jolly (ed.), PUF, 1960
