= Georges Bruguier =

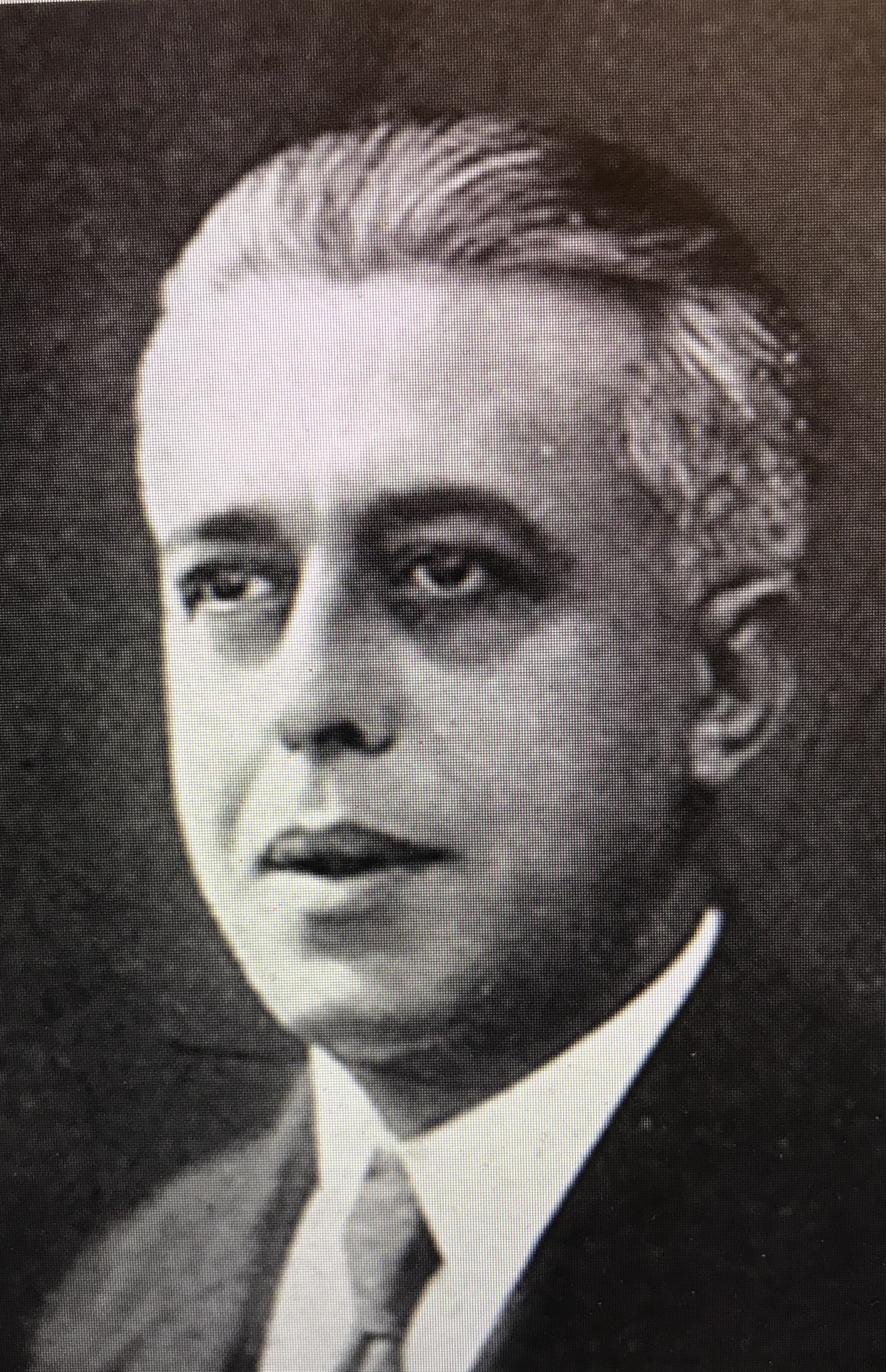

Member of the French Senate
- In office 1924–1940

Personal details
- Born: 16 March 1884 Nîmes
- Died: 20 August 1962 (aged 78) Carcassonne
- Party: French Section of the Workers' International
- Education: University of Montpellier
- Occupation: journalist
- Awards: Croix de Guerre and Médaille militaire

Military service
- Branch/service: French Army
- Battles/wars: First World War

Victorien Félix Bruguier (16 March 1884 – 20 August 1962), called Georges Bruguier, was a French politician and journalist.

Born in Nîmes, Georges Brugier was a son of trade unionist Victorien Bruguier. He studied law at the University of Montpellier and worked for the left-wing newspaper La Dépêche de Toulouse.

Bruguier served with the French Army during the First World War and was awarded the Croix de Guerre and Médaille militaire. After the war Bruguier became active in politics although he was not a member of a political party until the 1930s when he joined the French Section of the Workers' International (SFIO) (French socialist party). He stood for unsuccessfully in elections to the city council in 1919 and 1924 on lists backed by the SFIO and Radical Party. He was elected to the French Senate to represent the Gard department in a by-election in 1924, sitting with the Democratic Left until he joined the SFIO, and finally to the city council the year following.

Having been re-elected in subsequent elections to the senate, Bruguier was still serving in July 1940 when he was one of the 80 who voted against the grant of special powers to Philippe Pétain and the creation of the Vichy régime. As a consequence, he was removed from office by the Vichy régime and interned at Saint-Paul-d'Eyjeaux where he remained until liberated in 1944.

He was mayor of Nîmes and served in the provisional consultative and constituent assemblies from 1944 to 1946 but did not seek election to the new National Assembly of France when his term expired. Leaving politics, he moved to Carcassonne where he worked as a writer and journalist. He died in Carcassonne and is buried in the Cimetière de la Cité there. In addition to his military honours, Bruguier was an officer of the Légion d'honneur.
