= Loriol-sur-Drôme =

- Commune
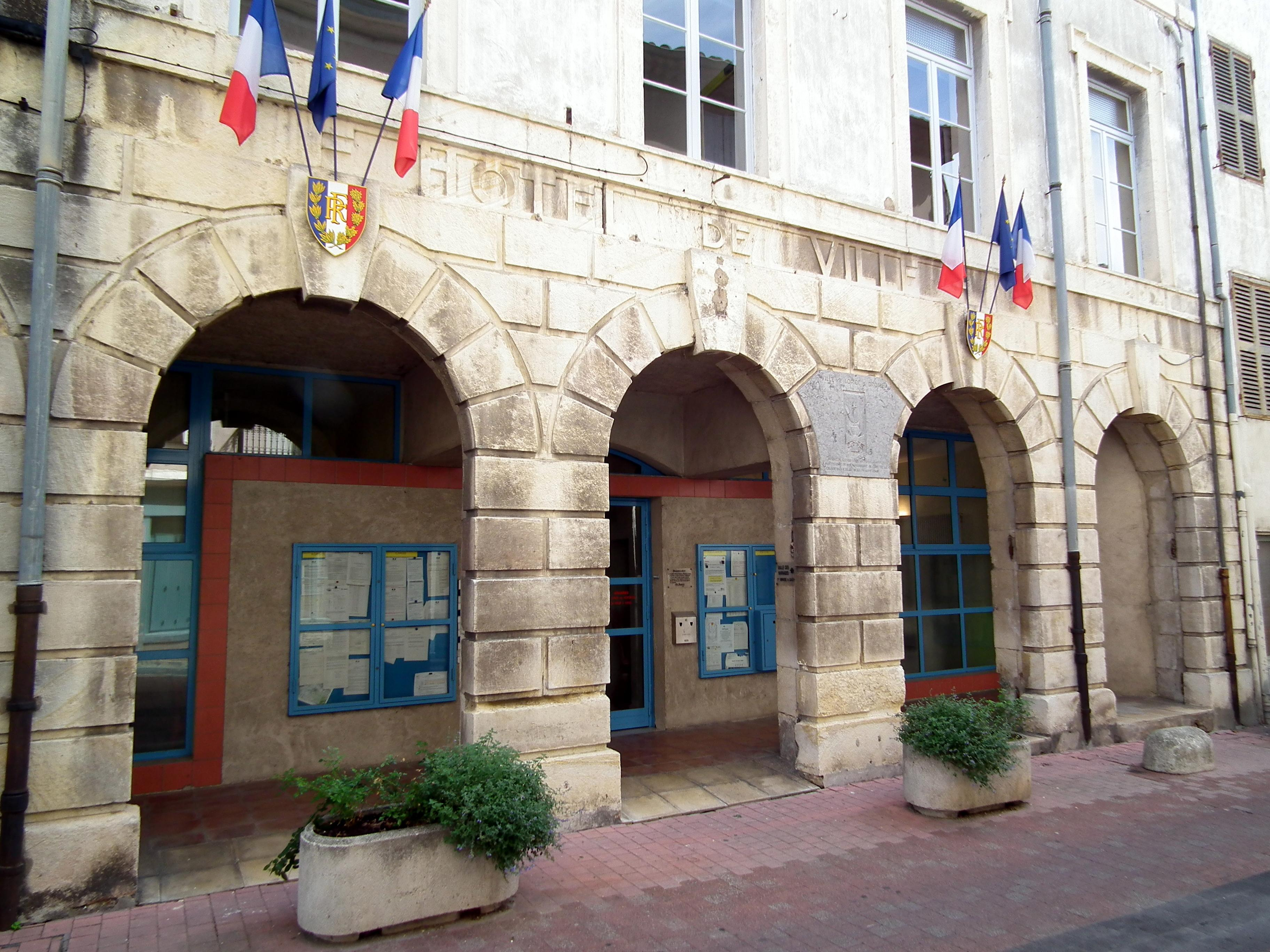
- Town hall

- Coat of arms
- Location of Loriol-sur-Drôme
- Location within France Location within Auvergne-Rhône-Alpes
- Coordinates: 44°45′09″N 4°49′24″E
- Country: France
- Region: Auvergne-Rhône-Alpes
- Department: Drôme
- Arrondissement: Die
- Canton: Loriol-sur-Drôme
- Intercommunality: Val de Drôme en Biovallée

Government
  - Mayor (2020–2026): Claude Aurias
- Area^{1}: 28.66 km^{2} (11.07 sq mi)
- Elevation: 108 m (354 ft)
- Highest elevation: 365 m (1,198 ft)
- Lowest elevation: 81 m (266 ft)
- Population (2023): 6,614
  - Density: 230.8/km^{2} (597.7/sq mi)
- Time zone: UTC+01:00 (CET)
  - Summer (DST): UTC+02:00 (CEST)
- INSEE/Postal code: 26166 /26270
- ^{1} French Land Register data, which excludes lakes, ponds, glaciers > 1 km^{2} (0.386 sq mi or 247 acres) and river estuaries.

Loriol-sur-Drôme (French pronunciation: [lɔʁjɔl syʁ dʁom], literally Loriol on Drôme; Vivaro-Alpine: L’Auriòu de Droma) is a commune in the Drôme department in southeastern France.

Loriol is situated in the Rhône valley, between Valence and Montélimar. The neighbouring villages are Livron-sur-Drôme, Mirmande, and Cliousclat.

== History ==
Roman emperor Aurelian is said to have based a camp here. The medieval fortress was destroyed in the wars of religion, leaving only the ramparts.

During World War II, Loriol was heavily damaged by Allied bombing in August 1944.

== Population ==
Historical population

| Year | Pop. | ±% p.a. |
|---|---|---|
| 1793 | 1,839 | — |
| 1800 | 2,392 | +3.83% |
| 1806 | 2,344 | −0.34% |
| 1821 | 2,458 | +0.32% |
| 1831 | 3,048 | +2.17% |
| 1836 | 3,340 | +1.85% |
| 1841 | 3,460 | +0.71% |
| 1846 | 3,530 | +0.40% |
| 1851 | 3,588 | +0.33% |
| 1856 | 3,554 | −0.19% |
| 1861 | 3,524 | −0.17% |
| 1866 | 3,512 | −0.07% |
| 1872 | 3,634 | +0.57% |
| 1876 | 3,686 | +0.36% |
| 1881 | 3,511 | −0.97% |
| 1886 | 3,518 | +0.04% |
| 1891 | 3,506 | −0.07% |
| 1896 | 3,330 | −1.02% |
| 1901 | 3,108 | −1.37% |

| Year | Pop. | ±% p.a. |
|---|---|---|
| 1906 | 3,136 | +0.18% |
| 1911 | 3,012 | −0.80% |
| 1921 | 3,112 | +0.33% |
| 1926 | 3,168 | +0.36% |
| 1931 | 3,057 | −0.71% |
| 1936 | 2,800 | −1.74% |
| 1946 | 2,685 | −0.42% |
| 1954 | 2,886 | +0.91% |
| 1962 | 3,583 | +2.74% |
| 1968 | 3,421 | −0.77% |
| 1975 | 3,514 | +0.38% |
| 1982 | 4,635 | +4.03% |
| 1990 | 5,609 | +2.41% |
| 1999 | 5,698 | +0.18% |
| 2007 | 5,722 | +0.05% |
| 2012 | 6,019 | +1.02% |
| 2017 | 6,593 | +1.84% |
| 2023 | 6,614 | +0.05% |

Source: EHESS and INSEE (1968-2023)

== See also ==
- Communes of the Drôme department
