= 1914 French legislative election =

← 1910	26 April and 10 May 1914	1919 →

All 592 seats in the Chamber of Deputies 297 seats needed for a majority
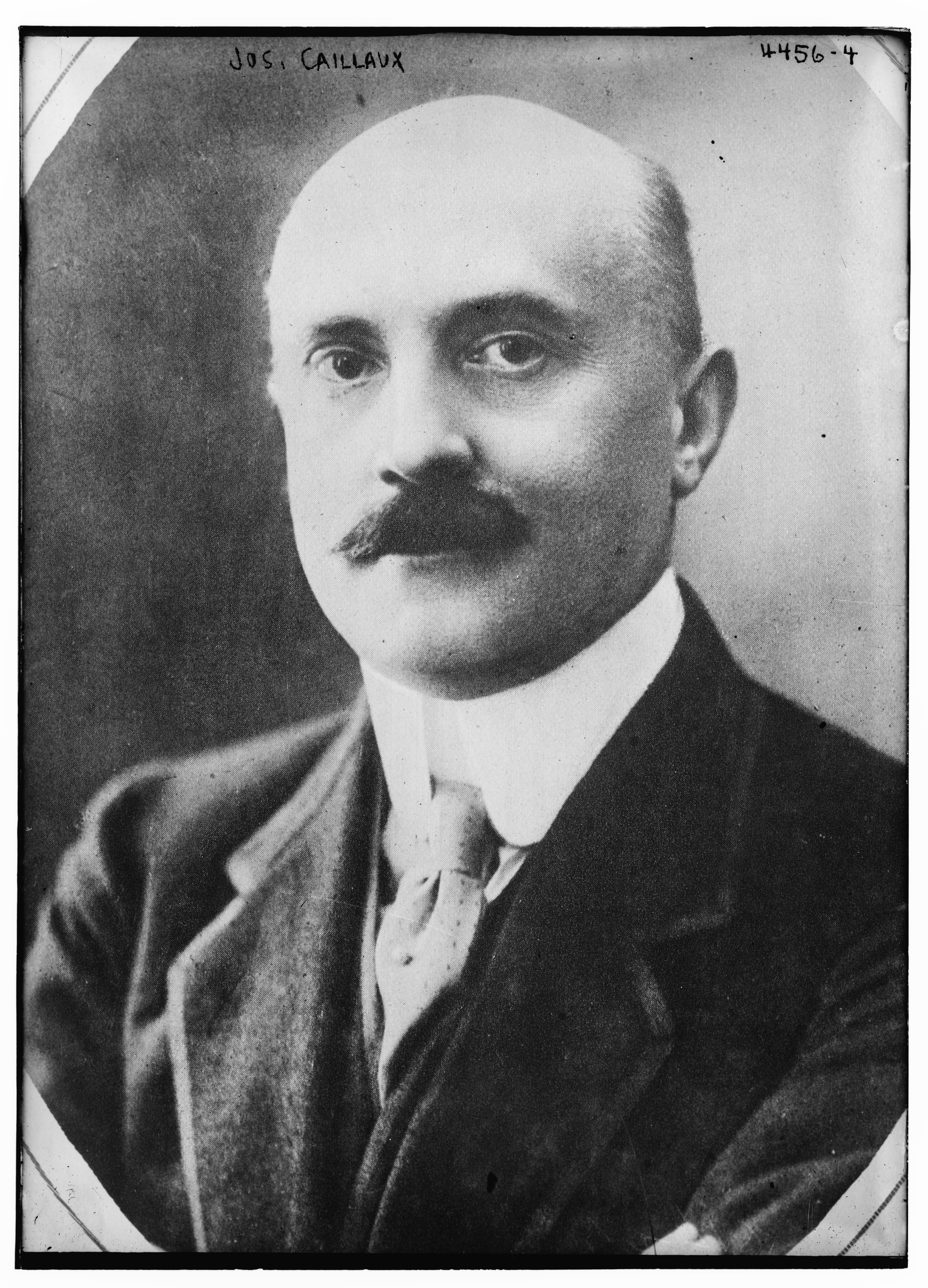

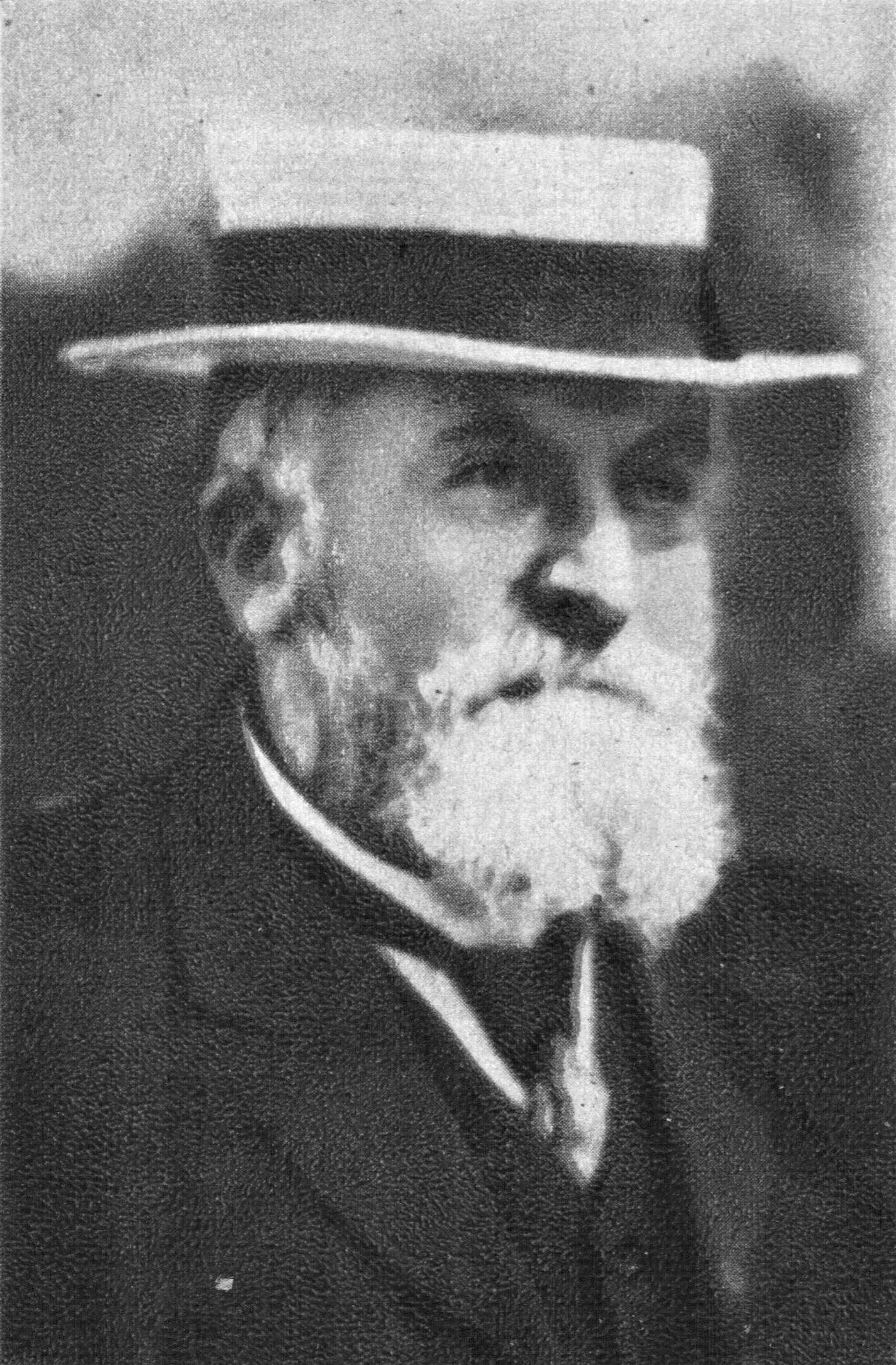

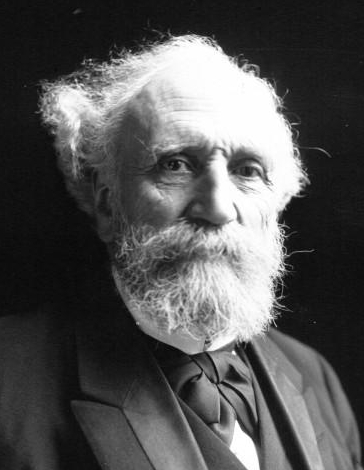

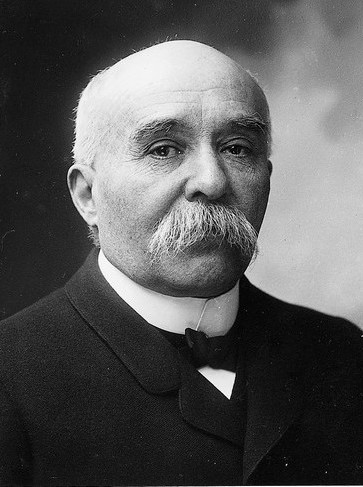

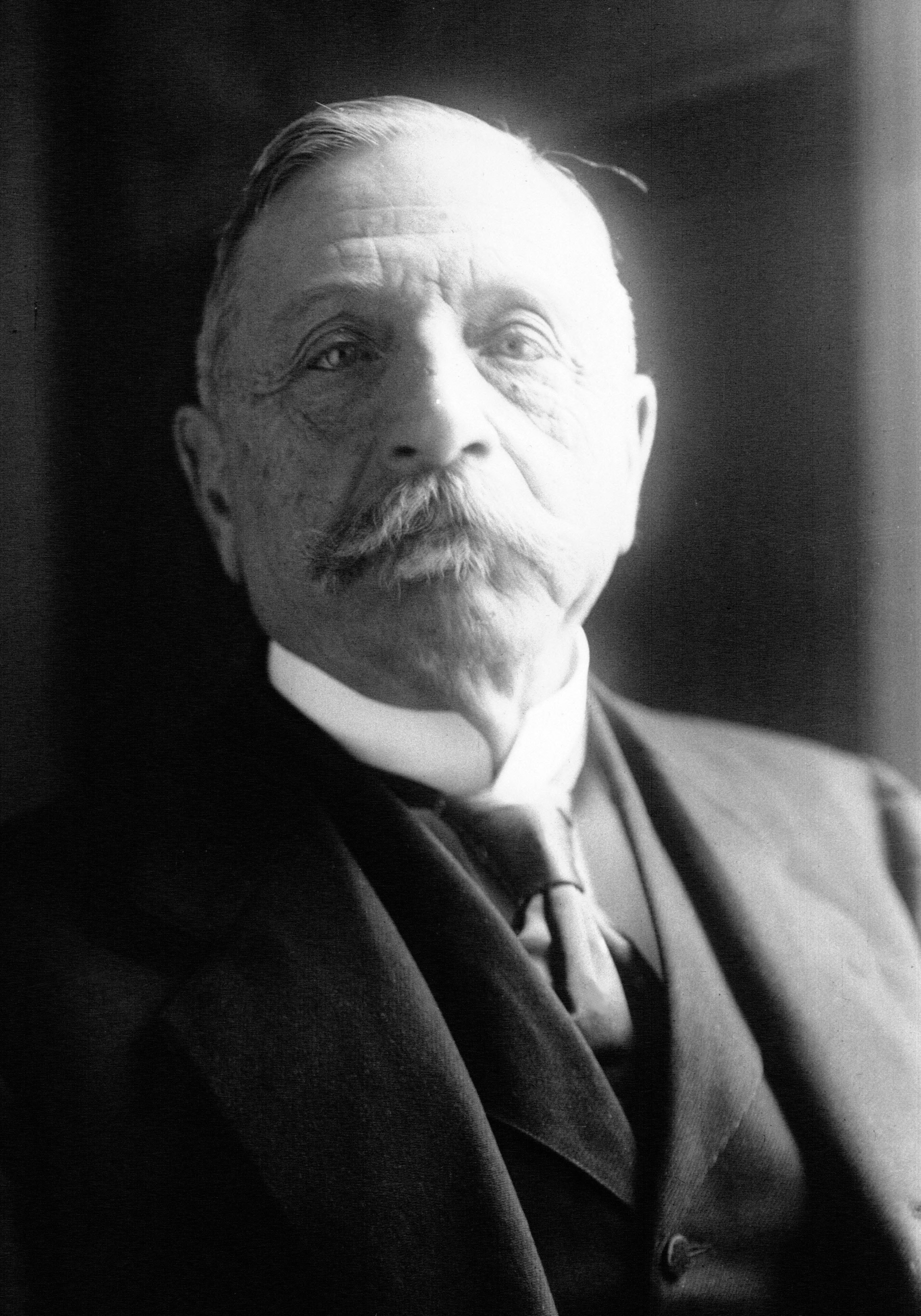
	Majority party	Minority party	Third party
Leader	Joseph Caillaux	Jean Jaurès	Alexandre Ribot
Party	PRV	SFIO	Republican Federation
Seats won	140	103	96
Seat change	▼8	▲28	▼20
Popular vote	1,530,188	1,413,044	1,588,075
Percentage	18.15%	16.76%	18.84%
Swing	▼2.30pp	▲3.61pp	▼1.41pp
	Fourth party	Fifth party
Leader	Georges Clemenceau	Jacques Piou
Party	RI	ALP
Seats won	96	73
Seat change	▲36	▲68
Popular vote	1,399,830	1,297,722
Percentage	16.60%	15.39
Swing	▼5.16pp	▲13.58pp
Prime Minister before election
Gaston Doumergue
RI
Elected Prime Minister
René Viviani
PRS

Legislative elections were held in France on 26 April and 10 May 1914, three months before the outbreak of World War I. The Radical Socialist Party emerged as the largest party, though, with the outbreak of the First World War, many in the Chamber, ranging from Catholics to socialists, united to form the Union sacrée.

The elections saw 192 new members elected.

Alexandre Ribot, a member of the Democratic Republican Alliance, negotiated a government on 9 June 1914, but its perceived overly-centrist leanings lead much of the left-wing of the Radical Party to rebel against it, bringing it down on the day it was presented to the chamber. Ribot was quickly succeeded by René Viviani of the Republican-Socialist Party, who formed a centre-left government on 13 June, only four days later.

== Results ==
Party	Votes	%	Seats
Republican Federation	1,588,075	18.84	96
Republican, Radical and Radical-Socialist Party	1,530,188	18.15	140
French Section of the Workers' International	1,413,044	16.76	103
Independent Radicals	1,399,830	16.60	96
ALP–PN–Reactionaries	1,297,722	15.39	73
Democratic Republican Alliance	819,184	9.72	57
Republican-Socialist Party	326,927	3.88	27
Others	56,086	0.67	0
Total	8,431,056	100.00	592
Valid votes	8,431,056	97.62	
Invalid/blank votes	205,511	2.38	
Total votes	8,636,567	100.00	
Registered voters/turnout	11,185,078	77.22	
Source: Mackie & Rose, Nohlen & Stöver

== Sources ==
- https://www.france-politique.fr/elections-legislatives-1914.htm
