= Popular Liberal Action =

Centre-right political party in France (1901–1919)

Popular Liberal Action Action libérale populaire
- President: Jacques Piou
- Deputy President: Adrien Albert Marie de Mun
- Founded: 1901
- Dissolved: 1919
- Merged into: Republican Federation
- Headquarters: Paris
- Membership (1914): 250,000
- Ideology: Liberal conservatism Christian democracy Liberal Catholicism; Social Catholicism
- Political position: Centre-right
- National affiliation: Sacred Union (1914–1918)
- Colours: Light blue

The Popular Liberal Action (French: Action libérale populaire, ALP), simply called Liberal Action (Action libérale), was a political party that represented Catholic supporters of the French Third Republic. It operated in the center-right, primarily to oppose the left-wing Republican coalition led by Pierre Waldeck-Rousseau and Émile Combes who pursued an anti-clerical agenda designed to weaken the Catholic Church, especially its role in education. The ALP between 1901-1914 had its best election in 1902, with 78 deputies. It built a nationwide newspaper and propaganda network, had excellent funding. There were 1200 local committees, with 200,000 dues paying members in 1906.

== History ==
The Liberal Action was founded in 1901 by Jacques Piou and Albert de Mun, former monarchists who switched to republicanism at the request of Pope Leo XIII. From the Church's perspective, its mission was to express the political ideals and new social doctrines embodied in Leo's 1891 encyclical "Rerum Novarum".

Action libérale was the parliamentary group from which the political party emerged, adding the word populaire ("popular") to signify this expansion.

Membership was open to everyone, not just Catholics. It sought to gather all the "honest people" and to be the melting pot sought by Leo XIII where Catholics and moderate Republicans would unite to support a policy of tolerance and social progress. Its motto summarized its program: "Liberty for all; equality before the law; better conditions for the workers." However, the "old republicans" were few, and it did not manage to regroup all Catholics, as it was shunned by monarchists, Christian democrats, and Integrists. In the end, it recruited mostly among the liberal-Catholics (Jacques Piou) and the Social Catholics (Albert de Mun).

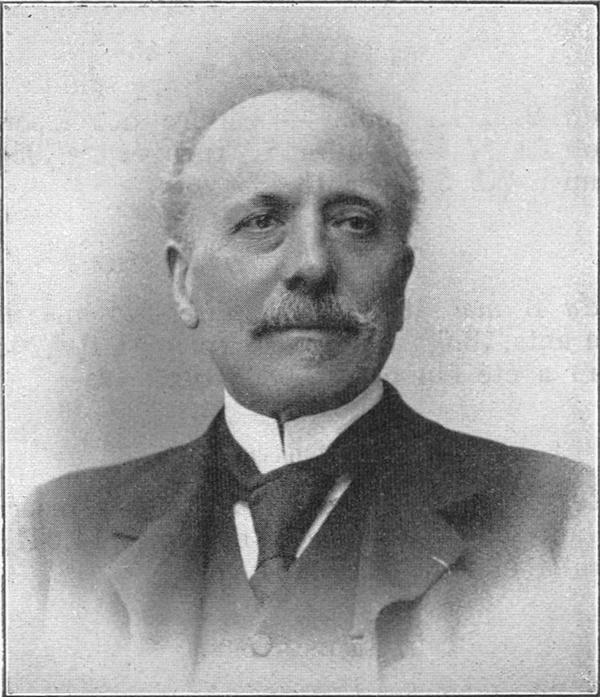
Count Albert de Mun, deputy party leader and head of the Social Catholic faction.

=== War ===
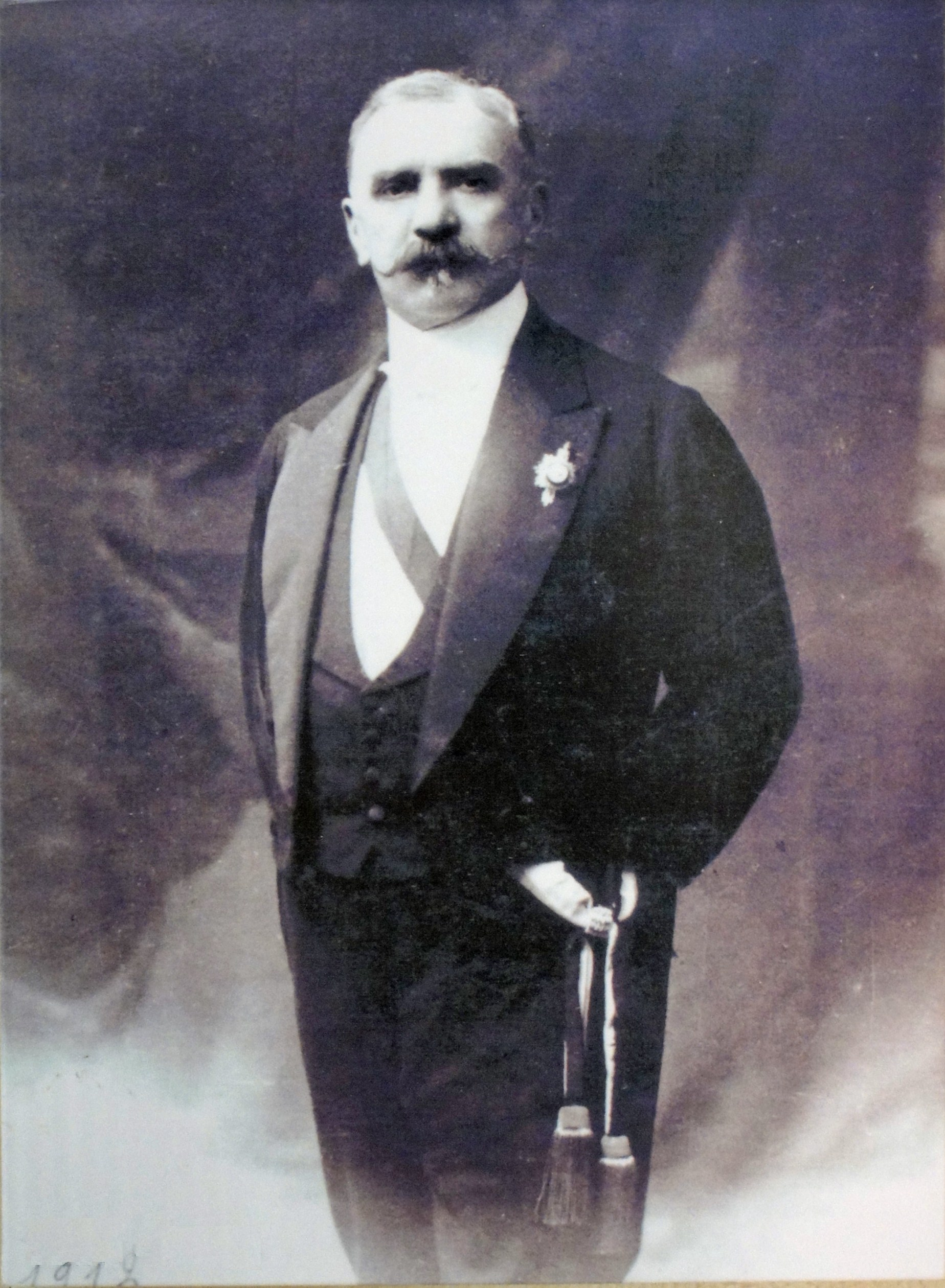
Deputy Émile Driant in 1912. Later killed during the Battle of Verdun and became a national hero.

The party was drawn into battle from its very beginnings (its first steps coincided with the beginning of the Combes ministry and its anticlerical combat policy), as religious matters were at the heart of its preoccupations. It defended the Church in the name of liberty and common law. Fiercely fought by the Action française, the movement declined from 1908, when it lost the support of Rome. Nevertheless, the ALP remained until 1914 the most important party on the right.

In 1919, the Action libérale populaire joined the Bloc national. After that, it sought to regroup, most notably in 1923 and 1927, but to no avail.

The Action libérale populaire played an important historical role by integrating into political life the Catholiques ralliés and by being the first political party, right of center, to organize itself under a "modern" scheme. A new attempt started in 1924 with the Popular Democratic Party.

== Notable members ==
- Jacques Piou, Founding president
- Albert de Mun, first vice-president
- Amiral de Cuverville, vice-president
- duc d'Estissac, vice-president
- Baron Xavier Reille
- Camille Guyot de Villeneuve
- Hyacinthe de Gailhard-Bancel
- Henri Bazire
- Henri-Constant Groussau
- Louis Hébert
- comte Ferri de Ludre
- Paul Lerolle
- marquis de l'Estourbeillon
- Jean Plichon
- Emmanuel de Las-Cases
- Léonce de Castelnau
- Xavier de la Rochefoucauld
- Émile Driant
- Denys Cochin
- Paul Dussaussoy

== Electoral results ==
Chamber of Deputies
Election year	# of overall votes	% of overall vote	# of overall seats won	+/–	Leader
1902	1,350,581 (#3)	16.00	85 / 589	–	Jacques Piou
1906	1,238,048 (#3)	14.05	66 / 585	▼19	Jacques Piou
1910	737,616 (#6)	8.65	30 / 595	▼36	Jacques Piou
1914	956,261 (#4)	11.34	23 / 601	▼7	Jacques Piou
