= Drôme (river) =

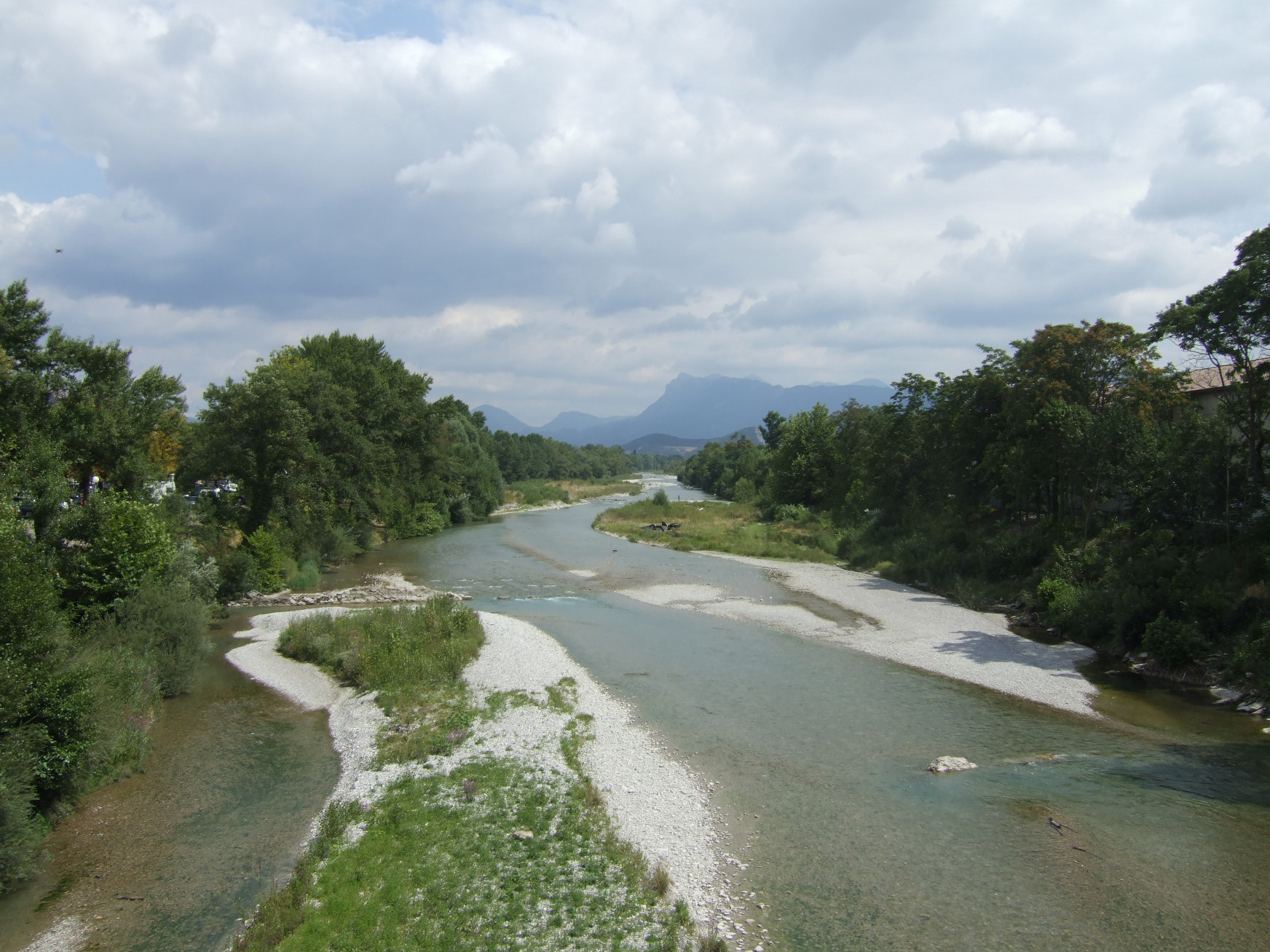

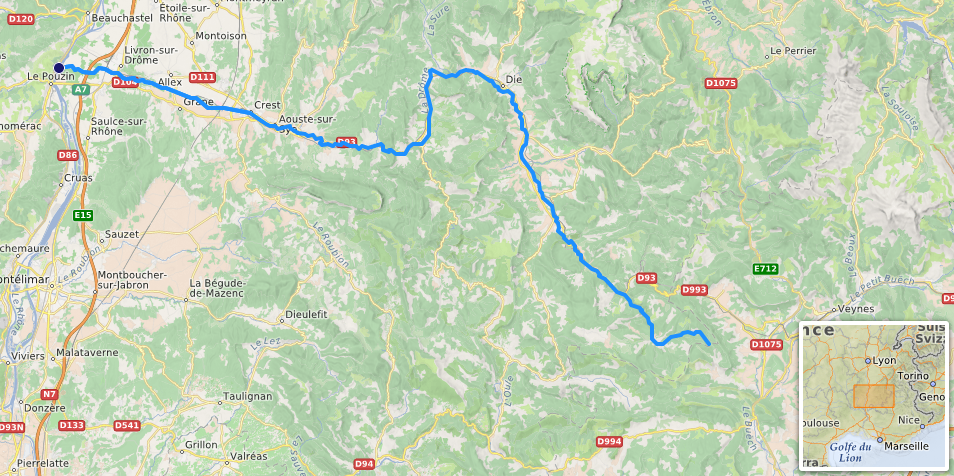

Location
- Country: France

Physical characteristics
- Source
  - location: French Prealps
- Mouth
  - location: Rhône
  - coordinates: 44°46′15″N 4°45′46″E
- Length: 110.6 km (68.7 mi)
- Basin size: 1,663 km^{2} (642 sq mi)
- Discharge
  - average: 20 m^{3}/s (710 cu ft/s)

Basin features
- Progression: Rhône→ Mediterranean Sea

The Drôme (French pronunciation: [dʁom]; Occitan: Droma), a river in southeastern France, a left tributary of the Rhône. It is 110.6 km (68.7 mi) long, and has a watershed of 1,663 km^{2}. Its source is in the western foothills of the Alps, near the village Valdrôme. It flows into the Rhône near Loriol-sur-Drôme, between Valence and Montélimar. Tributaries of the Drôme include the Bez (or Bès), the Roanne and the Gervanne.

The Drôme flows through the following départements and towns:

- Drôme (named after the river): Valdrôme, Luc-en-Diois, Die, Saillans, Allex, Crest, Loriol-sur-Drôme, Livron-sur-Drôme
- Ardèche : Le Pouzin
