= Paul Dussaussoy =

French lawyer and politician

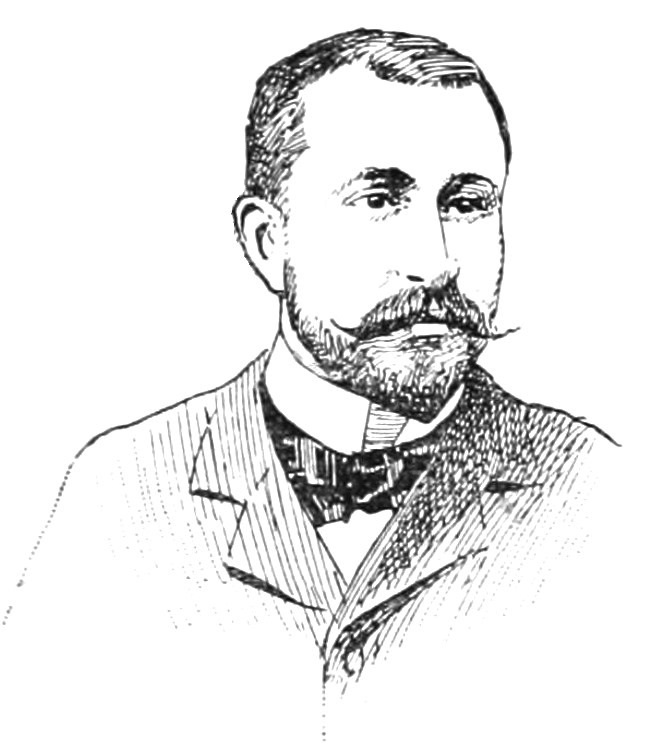
- Dussaussoy from Le Monde moderne (December 1898)

Deputy for Boulogne II
- In office 3 September 1893 – 31 May 1902
- Preceded by: Auguste Boulanger-Bernet
- Succeeded by: Louis Mill
- In office 20 May 1906 – 15 March 1909
- Preceded by: Louis Mill
- Succeeded by: Alfred Delcluze

Personal details
- Born: 6 January 1860 Dunkirk, Nord, France
- Died: 15 March 1909 (aged 49) Paris, Seine, France
- Party: Popular Liberal Action (after 1901)
- Occupation: Politician

Paul Dussaussoy (6 January 1860 – 15 March 1909) was a French lawyer and politician. Born in Dunkirk, Nord, he was a deputy to the National Assembly from 1893 to 1902 and again from 1906 until his premature death in 1909. He introduced the first French bill that proposed to give votes to women, at first limited to local elections.

== Family ==
Paul Dussaussoy came from a family of industrialists with a tradition of parliamentary activity. His family were great industrialists in the Nord region. His grandfather – Omer Dussaussoy – was a deputy during the July Monarchy. His father – Paul Antoine Dussaussoy-Hubert (1820–87) – was a Bonapartiste who was deputy for Pas-de-Calais from 1876 to 1878 and 1885–87. His wife – Marthe Leduc – was the sister of Jeanne Leduc, who was married to industrialist and politician Jean Plichon.

== Career ==
Dussaussoy became an advocate at the Paris Court of Appeal. In 1889 he was elected councilor for the canton of Marquise in the Pas-de-Calais general council. He ran for election to the legislature for the 2nd constituency of Boulogne, Pas-de-Calais, in 1893. An advocate of social reforms and a Catholic supporter of the Republic following the publication of the papal encyclical Au milieu des sollicitudes, he was elected deputy on 3 September 1893, and reelected on 22 May 1898, holding office until 31 May 1902. Both elections were decided in the second round of voting.

Dussaussoy was very popular among rural voters in his constituency. He was very hostile to the "odious privileges of the vintage distillers" and was in favour of women's votes." He believed voting to be a "necessary civic experience for all members of a democracy" supporting the election of senators by universal suffrage and proportional representation for deputies. He was most active in discussions on budget issues but was involved in debates on many other topics. In 1895 he proposed a bill through which unions could own buildings and receive donations. In 1897 his proposed change to the recruitment laws was accepted.

Dussaussoy joined the (mostly Catholic) Popular Liberal Action (Action libérale populaire). Established by Jacques Piou in 1901, it was opposed to arbitrary anti-clerical measures, supporting freedom of association, education and religion. In the 1902 elections Dussaussoy ran on this platform and was narrowly defeated by Louis Mill of the Ligue d'union républicaine.

Dussaussoy was again elected deputy for Pas-de-Calais on 20 May 1906, holding office until his death in 1909. In his third term he was less active in debates. He called for workers' pensions with an age limit set at 55 or 60, for family benefits and for legislation to assist trade unions, cooperatives and mutual aid societies. He introduced a proposal for women's suffrage in 1906 which gave women the right to vote in elections for municipal, district and departmental councilors. He was the first in France to advocate votes for women, a very advanced position at the time. For example, in a 1907 pamphlet the Prime Minister Georges Clemenceau declared that if women were given the vote France would return to the Middle Ages.

Paul Dussaussoy died on 15 March 1909 in the 16th arrondissement of Paris after a short illness.

== Women's suffrage bill ==
Dussaussoy's proposal that women be allowed to vote in municipal and local elections was to be followed by the right to vote in national elections. The rapporteur of the committee that examined the proposal was Ferdinand Buisson (Note: Buisson was a radical socialist and pacifist, one of the founders of the Human Rights League, and later won the Nobel Peace Prize.) (1841–1932), a Radical who was sympathetic to women's suffrage, unlike most Radicals. In November 1907 the General Council of the Seine yielded to pressure from the leading French feminist Hubertine Auclert and gave its support to the bill. The bill was pushed to the bottom of the agenda of the committee on voting rules. The President of the committee judged it important to separate the question of votes for women from the more important question of proportional representation, which was considered first. Buisson submitted a separate report on women's suffrage on 16 July 1909, some months after Dussaussoy's death. Buisson's report supported the proposition. The text was published with many annexes in a collection of parliamentary studies in 1911.

Discussion was delayed until 1913, then postponed indefinitely. The Chamber of Deputies finally debated the bill in May 1919. The former prime minister René Viviani gave an eloquent speech in its support, and the chamber voted in its favour by 344 to 97. Seventy-three of the 76 socialist deputies voted for the Dussaussoy-Buisson bill. (Note: The SFIO (Section Française de l'Internationale Ouvrière) had admitted women as members before World War I (1914–18), the first party to do so.) The Senate also had to approve the bill before it could become law and delayed their discussion until November 1922. The Senate brought up many of the old arguments against giving women the vote, such as the effect on the status of the husband as head of the family. The Senate opposed the law on the basis that women would be too easily influenced by the church. Despite the defeat of the bill, it was reintroduced in each subsequent legislature by the group defending the rights of women. (Note: It was not until 1944 that Charles de Gaulle issued an ordinance stating that women were recognized as voters with the same rights as men.)

== Sources ==
- Bertrand, Alphonse (1893), "DUSSAUSSOY (Paul)", La Chambre de 1893: biographies des 581 députés (in French), chez Quantin
- Cabanel, Patrick (2017-11-15), Ferdinand Buisson: Père de l'école laïque (in French), Labor et Fides, ISBN 978-2-8309-5083-0
- Forth, C.; Accampo, E. (2009-11-27), Confronting Modernity in Fin-de-Siècle France: Bodies, Minds and Gender, Palgrave Macmillan UK, ISBN 978-0-230-24684-3
- Gazdar, Kaevan (2016-09-30), Feminism's Founding Fathers: The Men Who Fought for Women's Rights, John Hunt Publishing, ISBN 978-1-78099-161-0
- Hilaire, Yves-Marie (1977), Une Chrétienté au XIXe siècle ?: La vie religieuse des populations du diocèse d'Arras (1840-1914) (in French), vol. I, Presses Univ. Septentrion, ISBN 978-2-85939-073-0
- Jolly, Jean (1960–1977), "Dussaussoy, Paul", dictionnaire des parlementaires français de 1889 à 1940, Paris: Presses universitaires de France, ISBN 2-1100-1998-0
- Jolly, Jean (1960–1977b), "Dussaussoy-Hubert, Paul", dictionnaire des parlementaires français de 1889 à 1940, Paris: Presses universitaires de France, ISBN 2-1100-1998-0
- "Le Petit Dico Décalé du Nord-Pas-de-Calais : Paul Dussaussoy (Boulogne-sur-Mer)", Daily Nord, 26 April 2015
- McMillan, James F. (2000), France and Women, 1789–1914: Gender, Society and Politics, Psychology Press, ISBN 978-0-415-22602-8
- Paul Dussaussoy (in French), Assemblée nationale
- Przybyla, Francis (2007-08-07), Le Blé, le sucre et le charbon: Les parlementaires du Nord et leur action 1881–1889 (in French), Presses Univ. Septentrion, ISBN 978-2-85939-980-1
