= Élise Moreau =

French poet (1813–1861)

- Born: 1813; Rochefort, FrenchEmpire
- Died: 1861 (aged 47–48); Paris, France
- Occupation: Poet
- Spouse: Paulin Gagne (m. 1853)
- Writing career
- Period: 19th century
- Genre: Poetry

Élise Moreau (1813 – 1876) was a French poet.

== Biography ==
Moreau was born in 1813 in Rochefort but was raised in Niort where her family settled. She started writing poetry at an early age. A local prefect M. de Saint-Georges, encouraged her and gave her letters of recommendation to study in Paris.

She travelled there with her mother, and received a warm welcome, notably from Sophie Bawr, her gratitude to whom she wrote about when Bawr died in 1861. The first collection of Moreau's, Dreams of a Young Girl, was published in 1837, shortly after her arrival in Paris.

On the death of Élisa Guizot, in January 1833 Élise Moreau wrote an elegy. Along with Nodier, Chateaubriand, and Lamartine, Moreau saw François Guizot, then Minister of Education, as a role model.

She was sent to the Académie française, to participate in a contest for the legacy of Molière. She submitted a piece which did not win the prize, but it did bring her wider fame.

After some further publications such as A Destiny (scenes of the intimate life) and Memories of a little child, she married the poet Paulin Gagne, whose eccentric designs, translated into the most amazing styles, and caused more notoriety than she would have desired. In 1854 they founded a literary journal Le Théâtre du monde, which appeared from 1854 to 1857; she collaborated in each issue. Later in her life she became influenced by her husband's eccentric lifestyle as can be seen in the work Omégar. In this work, it was said that she was less Ms. Moreau and more Mme. Gagne.

She and her husband spent the last years of their lives living in poverty. She probably died in the same year as her husband, 1876.

== Works ==
- Une destinée, scène de la vie intime, (1838)
- Souvenirs d'un petit enfant, (1840)
- Rêves d'une jeune fille (1844)
- L'Âge d'or: Poésie de l'enfance (1850)
- La Fille du maçon suivi de Simple histoire d'une famille (Mame, 1851)
- L'anémone du Colisée, (1865)
- Vocation ou Le jeune missionnaire, (1856)
- Prologue and epilogue of L'Unitéide, ou la Femme-Messie (1857)
- Omégar (1859)
- Madame de Bawr, étude biographique sur sa vie et ses ouvrages (Didier, 1861)
- L'amie des enfants de Madame Élisa Guizot ; Moralités poétiques de Élise Moreau ; (Didier 1864) Les Moralités en vers précèdent chaque histoire rédigée par Madame Guizot.

=== Online ===
- Vois-tu ce vert sentier
- Bonne fille et bonne mère
- à Monsieur de Lamartine, sur la mort de sa fille Regrets
