= Paulin Gagne =

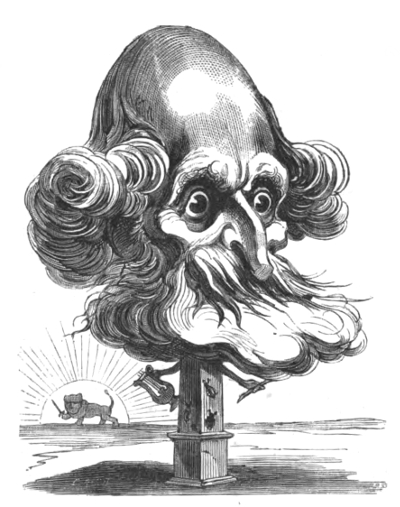
Paulin Gagne

Étienne-Paulin Gagne, known as Paulin Gagne (8 June 1808 – August 1876) was a French poet, essayist, lawyer, politician, inventor, and eccentric. His best-known poem, The Woman-Messiah, is among the longest poems in French, or any language. The poem is 25,000 verses (60 acts and 12 songs) and is notable for its 24th act entitled Bestiologie which enumerates the advantages that a citizen of Paris would have by marrying the animals of the Jardin des Plantes. He is also notable for proposing anthropophagy (cannibalism) at a public meeting and offering himself as food to starving Algerians.

== Biography ==
Gagne was born in Montoison on 8 June 1808 of a family which soon reestablished itself in Montélimar. He established himself as a lawyer early on and lost his lone case after relocating to Paris.

In the 1850s, he moved back to Montélimar, and turned to prose and poetry after giving up law. His writings focused primarily on bizarre and burlesque social and political matters. In 1853 he married Élise Moreau. He spent time as a minor politician and the creator of an unsuccessful journal entitled Hope. More success came with his second publication entitled The Theatre of the World in which contained some well-regarded articles, none by Gagne. Shortly thereafter, Gagne wrote, The Woman-Messiah, one of his many lengthy poems. During this time he also invented a universal language he named La Gagne-monopanglotte, which had no other known speakers.

In 1863, he moved back to Paris. He began to publish primarily in journals devoted to esoteric topics. One such journal, Uniter of the Visible and Invisible World, published an article in which Gagne alleged the intervention of Satan at a séance.

Towards the end of the Second French Empire, at public meetings, Gagne would make speeches on socialism, anti-monarchy and similar topics. Often he would organize strange political demonstrations at which he was the only participator. Many of his antics brought on laughter, but he was always a perpetual candidate for parliament. Gagne consistently took the radical route. In 1868, during an Algerian famine, he called for hippophagy (the eating of horse meat) as a solution and then suggested cannibalism and called for legislation that would prevent the famine by making the Algerians eat all elderly persons in France over the age of 60, including himself. He stated, "[a] human being over sixty is neither useful nor ornamental, and to prove that I mean what I say, I am willing to give myself as food to my sublime and suffering townsmen."

== Influence ==
The Comte de Lautreamont is known to have read Gagne. In Lautreamont's Poesies, Gagne is grouped with twelve tragic poets which included Lord Byron and Goethe. Gagne has also been compared to Goriot, one of the main characters of Balzac's Le Père Goriot.
