= Hyacinthe de Gailhard-Bancel =

French politician

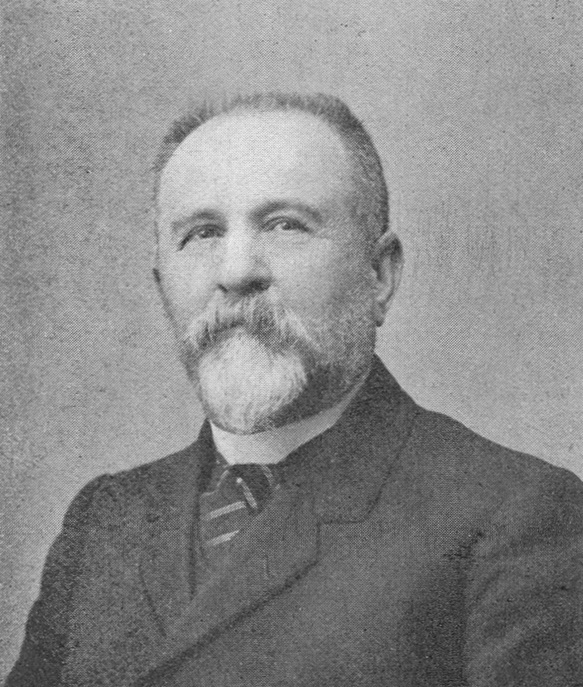
- Hyacinthe de Gailhard-Bancel, 1849
- Born: 1 November 1849; Allex, Drôme
- Died: 22 March 1936 (aged 86); Allex, Drôme
- Years active: 1884–1924

Hyacinthe de Gailhard-Bancel (1 November 1849 – 22 March 1936) was a French politician, lawyer, and pioneer of agricultural syndicalism. He was Deputy of the Ardèche (1899–1910, 1912–1924).

== Biography ==
Born on 1 November 1849 in Allex, Gailhard-Bancel was grandson of Charles de Gailhard-Bancel.

Gailhard-Bancel was a Christian socialist in his politics. He is also credited by historian Kevin Passmore as a "pioneer of agrarian corporatism". He has been named as a pioneer of agricultural syndicalism, believing syndicates would form a link between the nation's political system and its peasantry. Gailhard-Bancel's ideology has been called a precursor to the rural Catholic Action movement.

From 1884, Gailhard-Bancel engaged himself with the formation of agricultural unions in the Drôme and collaborated with Christian socialist movements. Gailhard-Bancel held the office of Deputy of the Ardèche from 1899, ending with his defeat by an opponent in 1910. This opponent's term ended in 1912 with their death, at which point Gailhard-Bancel won back the office, holding it until 1924, when he was beaten again. After this defeat, Gailhard-Bancel retired from politics.

Gailhard-Bancel was a member of the Société d'archéologie, d'histoire et de géographie de la Drôme in 1913 and in 1920.

Gailhard-Bancel died on 22 March 1936, in Allex.

== Works ==
- Les parlers locaux au point de vue social (1897)
- Quinze années d’action syndicale (1900)
- Les syndicats agricoles aux champs et au parlement, 1884-1924 (1929)
