= Ambonil =

- Commune
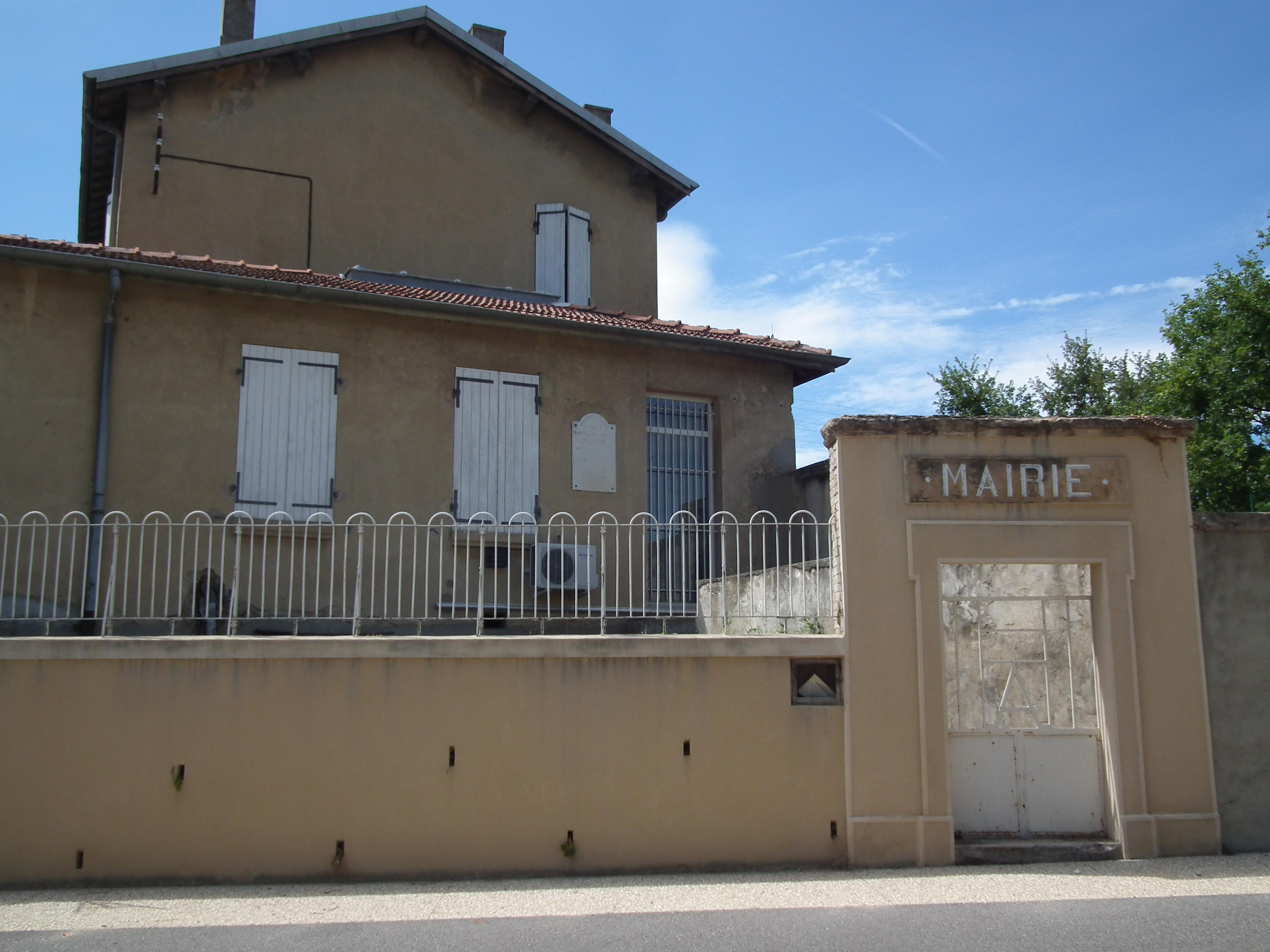
- The town hall in Ambonil
- Location of Ambonil
- Location within France Location within Auvergne-Rhône-Alpes
- Coordinates: 44°47′43″N 4°54′33″E
- Country: France
- Region: Auvergne-Rhône-Alpes
- Department: Drôme
- Arrondissement: Die
- Canton: Loriol-sur-Drôme
- Intercommunality: Val de Drôme en Biovallée

Government
  - Mayor (2020–2026): Bernard Carrères
- Area^{1}: 1.23 km^{2} (0.47 sq mi)
- Highest elevation: 159 m (522 ft)
- Lowest elevation: 134 m (440 ft)
- Population (2023): 106
  - Density: 86.2/km^{2} (223/sq mi)
- Time zone: UTC+01:00 (CET)
  - Summer (DST): UTC+02:00 (CEST)
- INSEE/Postal code: 26007 /26800
- ^{1} French Land Register data, which excludes lakes, ponds, glaciers > 1 km^{2} (0.386 sq mi or 247 acres) and river estuaries.

Ambonil (French pronunciation: [ɑ̃bɔnil]) is a commune in the Drôme department in southeastern France.

== Population ==
Historical population
Year	Pop.	±% p.a.
1968	75	—
1975	59	−3.37%
1982	59	+0.00%
1990	69	+1.98%
1999	100	+4.21%
2007	116	+1.87%
2012	121	+0.85%
2017	113	−1.36%
2023	106	−1.06%
Source: INSEE

== See also ==
- Communes of the Drôme department
