= Canton of Loriol-sur-Drôme =

Coordinates: 44.75°N 4.82°E

The canton of Loriol-sur-Drôme is an administrative division of the Drôme department, southeastern France. Its borders were modified at the French canton reorganisation which came into effect in March 2015. Its seat is in Loriol-sur-Drôme.

It consists of the following communes:

1. Allex
2. Ambonil
3. Cliousclat
4. Étoile-sur-Rhône
5. Livron-sur-Drôme
6. Loriol-sur-Drôme
7. Mirmande
8. Montoison
