= Bez (Drôme) =

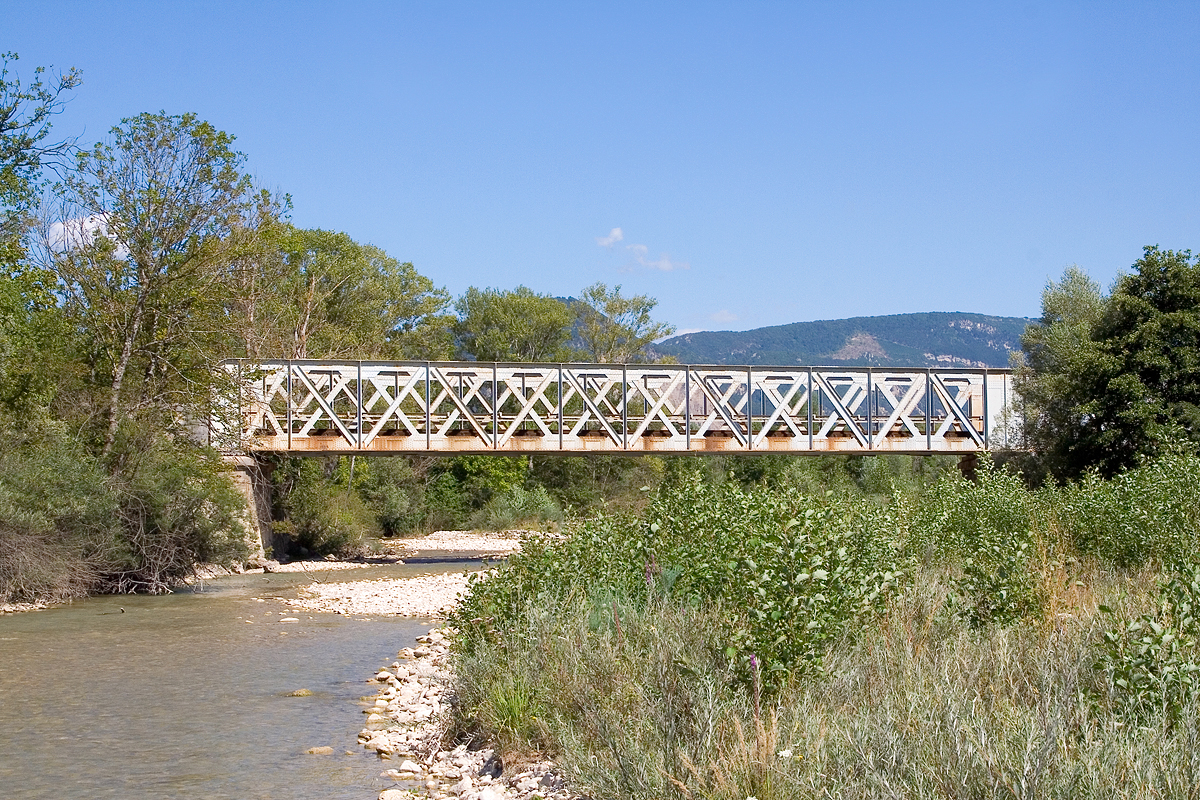

- Location within France Location within Auvergne-Rhône-Alpes

Location
- Country: France

Physical characteristics
- Mouth
  - location: Drôme
  - coordinates: 44°40′45″N 5°24′0″E
- Length: 25.5 km (15.8 mi)
- Basin size: 278 km^{2} (107 sq mi)

Basin features
- Progression: Drôme→ Rhône→ Mediterranean Sea

The Bez (also: Bès) is a tributary to the river Drôme in the Drôme department of France. It is 25.5 km (15.8 mi) long. It has a drainage basin of 278 km².

== Geography ==
The drainage basin of the Bez lies in the east of the department of Drôme. To the north and east the basin is defined by the Vercors Plateau (elevation between 1500 and 2000 meters) and to the south by the slightly lower heights of the Diois Plateau. The bassin drains to the west, the valley of the Drôme. The Bez joins the right bank of Drôme, in the town of Saint-Roman, about ten km upstream from the town of Die through with it eventually becomes a tributary to the river Rhône.
