= Montoison =

- Commune
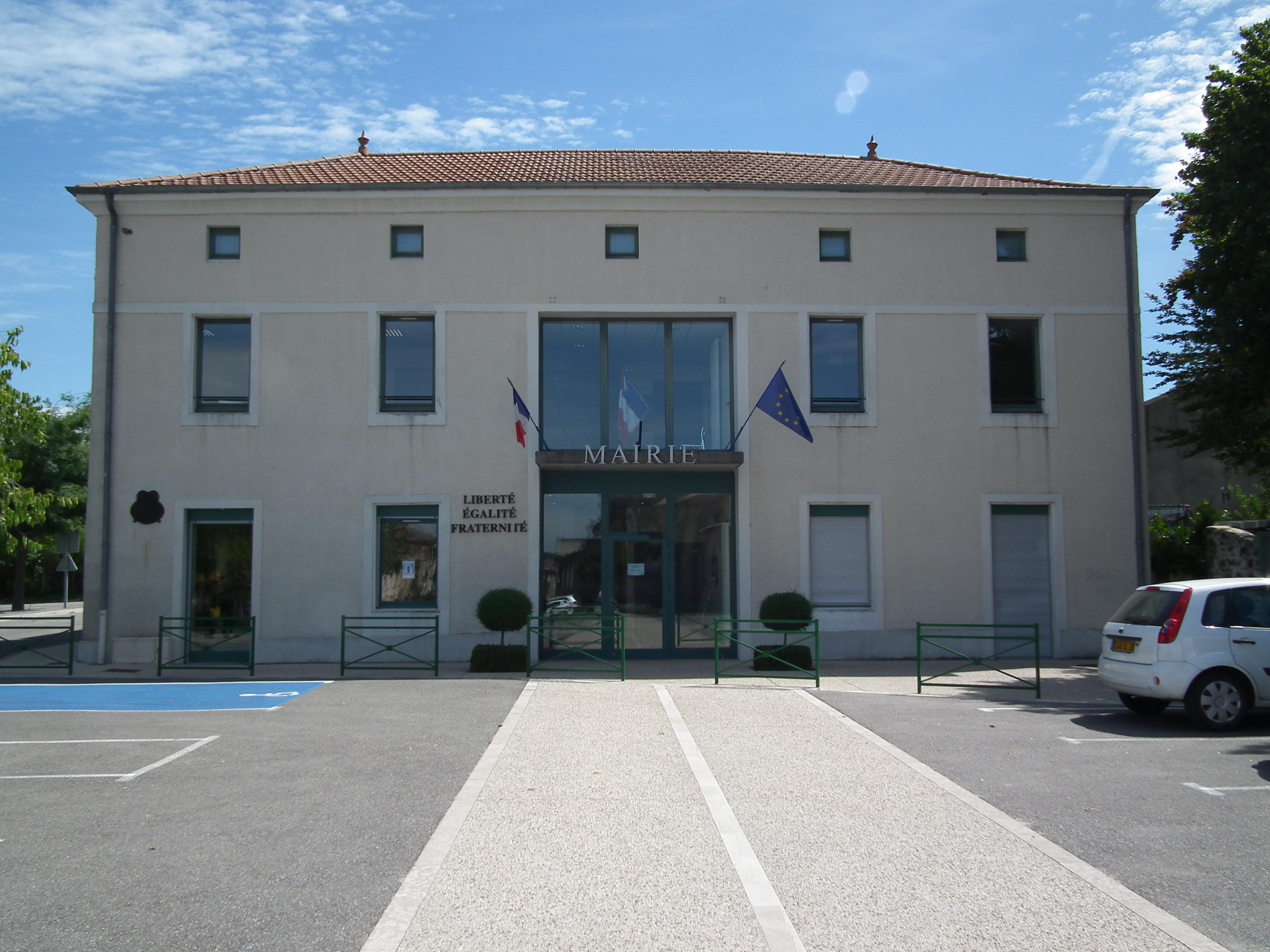
- The town hall of Montoison

- Coat of arms
- Location of Montoison
- Location within France Location within Auvergne-Rhône-Alpes
- Coordinates: 44°47′56″N 4°56′27″E
- Country: France
- Region: Auvergne-Rhône-Alpes
- Department: Drôme
- Arrondissement: Die
- Canton: Loriol-sur-Drôme
- Intercommunality: Val de Drôme en Biovallée

Government
  - Mayor (2020–2026): Jean-Marc Bouvier
- Area^{1}: 16.11 km^{2} (6.22 sq mi)
- Highest elevation: 261 m (856 ft)
- Lowest elevation: 129 m (423 ft)
- Population (2023): 1,926
  - Density: 119.6/km^{2} (309.6/sq mi)
- Time zone: UTC+01:00 (CET)
  - Summer (DST): UTC+02:00 (CEST)
- INSEE/Postal code: 26208 /26800
- ^{1} French Land Register data, which excludes lakes, ponds, glaciers > 1 km^{2} (0.386 sq mi or 247 acres) and river estuaries.

Montoison (French pronunciation: [mɔ̃twazɔ̃]; Occitan: Monteison) is a commune in the Drôme department in southeastern France.

== Population ==
Historical population
Year	Pop.	±% p.a.
1968	776	—
1975	771	−0.09%
1982	992	+3.67%
1990	1,222	+2.64%
1999	1,469	+2.07%
2007	1,692	+1.78%
2012	1,852	+1.82%
2017	1,925	+0.78%
2023	1,926	+0.01%
Source: INSEE

== Personalities ==
- Paulin Gagne (8 or 9 June 1808 – August 1876), French poet, essayist, lawyer, politician, inventor and eccentric, was born in Montoison.

== See also ==
- Communes of the Drôme department
