= Valdrôme =

- Commune
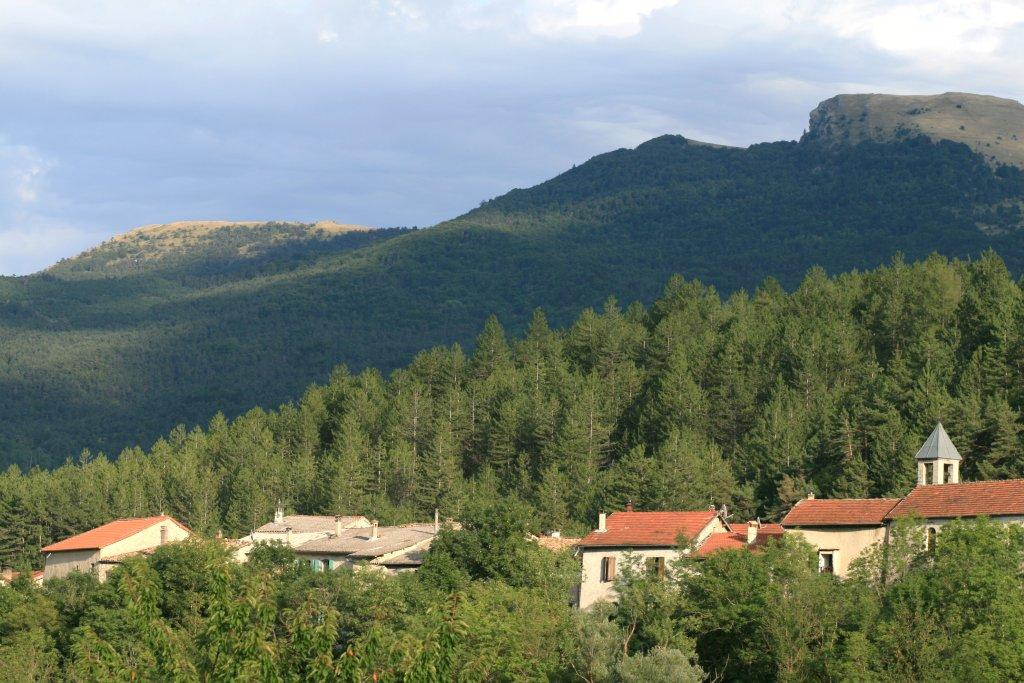
- The village of Valdrôme in 2008, with the Tête du Lion in the background
- Location of Valdrôme
- Location within France Location within Auvergne-Rhône-Alpes
- Coordinates: 44°30′18″N 5°34′23″E
- Country: France
- Region: Auvergne-Rhône-Alpes
- Department: Drôme
- Arrondissement: Die
- Canton: Le Diois
- Intercommunality: Diois

Government
  - Mayor (2020–2026): Jean Aramburu
- Area^{1}: 41.51 km^{2} (16.03 sq mi)
- Elevation: 789 m (2,589 ft)
- Highest elevation: 1,760 m (5,770 ft)
- Lowest elevation: 766 m (2,513 ft)
- Population (2023): 133
  - Density: 3.20/km^{2} (8.30/sq mi)
- Time zone: UTC+01:00 (CET)
  - Summer (DST): UTC+02:00 (CEST)
- INSEE/Postal code: 26361 /26310
- ^{1} French Land Register data, which excludes lakes, ponds, glaciers > 1 km^{2} (0.386 sq mi or 247 acres) and river estuaries.

Valdrôme (French pronunciation: [valdʁom]; Occitan: Vaudroma) is a commune in the Drôme department in southeastern France.

== Population ==
Historical population
Year	Pop.	±% p.a.
1968	158	—
1975	149	−0.83%
1982	151	+0.19%
1990	117	−3.14%
1999	118	+0.09%
2007	136	+1.79%
2012	137	+0.15%
2017	146	+1.28%
2023	133	−1.54%
Source: INSEE

== See also ==
- Communes of the Drôme department
