= Livron-sur-Drôme =

- Commune
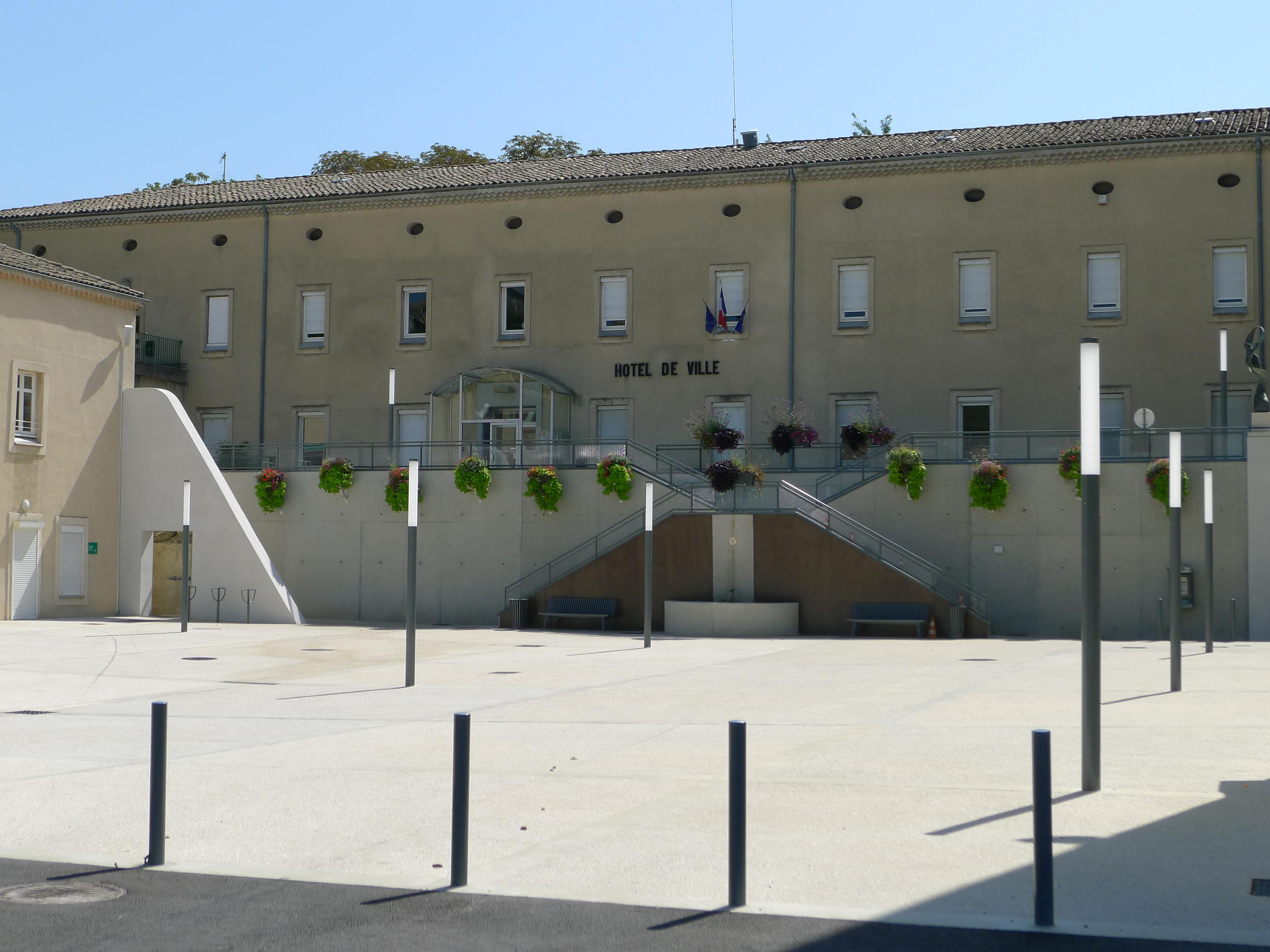
- The town hall of Livron-sur-Drôme

- Coat of arms
- Location of Livron-sur-Drôme
- Location within France Location within Auvergne-Rhône-Alpes
- Coordinates: 44°46′25″N 4°50′38″E
- Country: France
- Region: Auvergne-Rhône-Alpes
- Department: Drôme
- Arrondissement: Die
- Canton: Loriol-sur-Drôme
- Intercommunality: Val de Drôme en Biovallée

Government
  - Mayor (2020–2026): Francis Fayard
- Area^{1}: 39.52 km^{2} (15.26 sq mi)
- Elevation: 107 m (351 ft)
- Highest elevation: 255 m (837 ft)
- Lowest elevation: 88 m (289 ft)
- Population (2023): 9,329
  - Density: 236.1/km^{2} (611.4/sq mi)
- Time zone: UTC+01:00 (CET)
  - Summer (DST): UTC+02:00 (CEST)
- INSEE/Postal code: 26165 /26250
- ^{1} French Land Register data, which excludes lakes, ponds, glaciers > 1 km^{2} (0.386 sq mi or 247 acres) and river estuaries.

Livron, officially Livron-sur-Drôme (French pronunciation: [livʁɔ̃ syʁ dʁom], literally Livron on Drôme; Occitan: Liuron de Droma) is a commune in the Drôme department in southeastern France.

== Population ==
Historical population

Year	Pop.	±% p.a.
1793	2,234	—
1800	2,289	+0.35%
1806	2,352	+0.45%
1821	2,623	+0.73%
1831	3,275	+2.24%
1836	3,457	+1.09%
1841	3,730	+1.53%
1846	4,034	+1.58%
1851	4,022	−0.06%
1856	3,799	−1.13%
1861	4,039	+1.23%
1866	4,058	+0.09%
1872	4,265	+0.83%
1876	4,386	+0.70%
1881	4,258	−0.59%
1886	4,261	+0.01%
1891	4,070	−0.91%
1896	4,241	+0.83%
1901	4,320	+0.37%

Year	Pop.	±% p.a.
1906	4,324	+0.02%
1911	3,905	−2.02%
1921	3,834	−0.18%
1926	4,099	+1.35%
1931	4,110	+0.05%
1936	4,002	−0.53%
1946	4,285	+0.69%
1954	4,491	+0.59%
1962	5,288	+2.06%
1968	5,616	+1.01%
1975	5,674	+0.15%
1982	6,822	+2.67%
1990	7,294	+0.84%
1999	7,759	+0.69%
2007	8,945	+1.79%
2012	8,978	+0.07%
2017	9,104	+0.28%
2023	9,329	+0.41%

Source: EHESS and INSEE (1968-2023)

== See also ==
- Communes of the Drôme department
