= Cliousclat =

- Commune
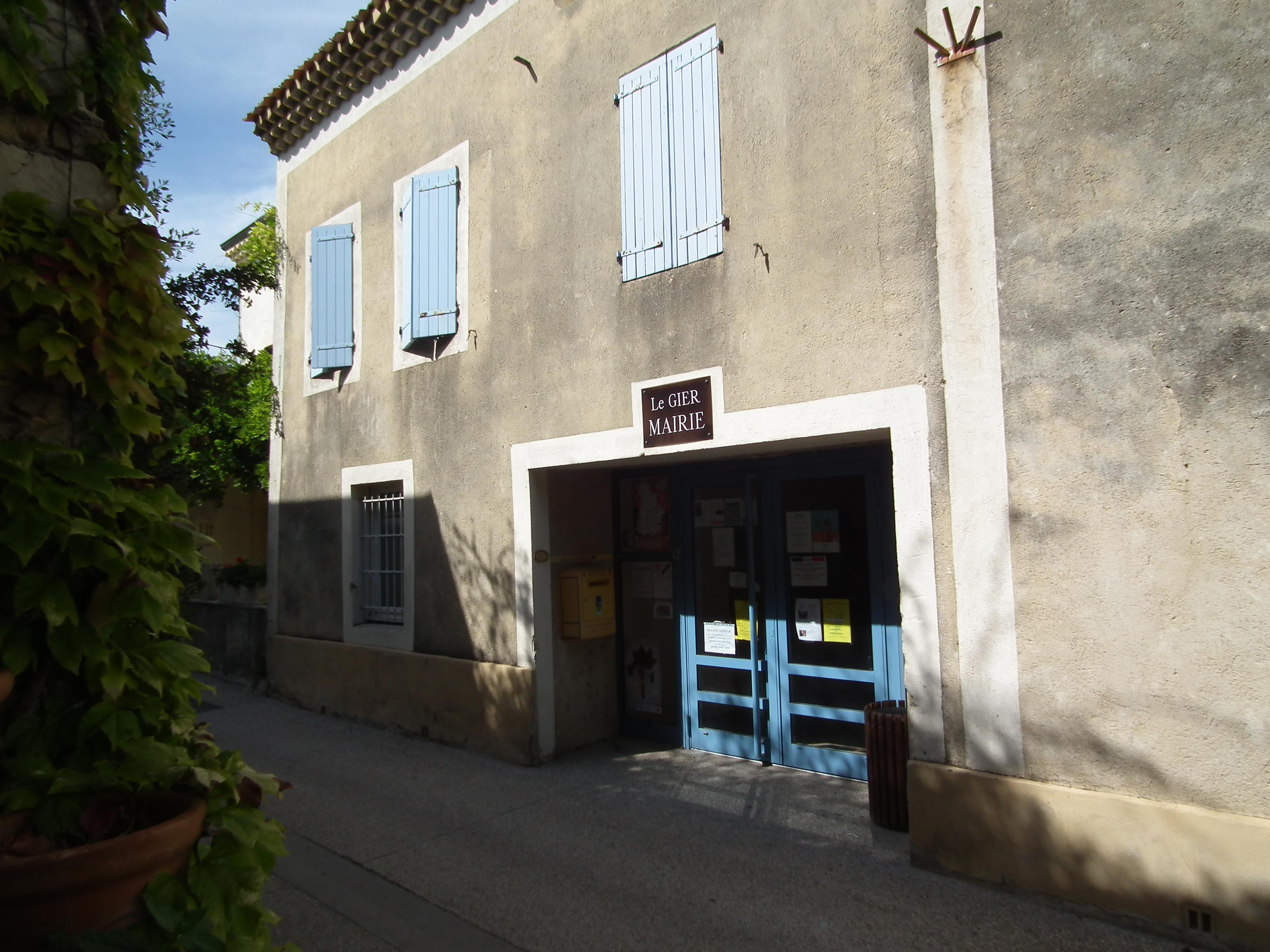
- The town hall in Cliousclat
- Location of Cliousclat
- Location within France Location within Auvergne-Rhône-Alpes
- Coordinates: 44°43′00″N 4°50′12″E
- Country: France
- Region: Auvergne-Rhône-Alpes
- Department: Drôme
- Arrondissement: Die
- Canton: Loriol-sur-Drôme
- Intercommunality: Val de Drôme en Biovallée

Government
  - Mayor (2020–2026): Gilbert Chareyron
- Area^{1}: 9.65 km^{2} (3.73 sq mi)
- Elevation: 213 m (699 ft)
- Highest elevation: 473 m (1,552 ft)
- Lowest elevation: 125 m (410 ft)
- Population (2023): 611
  - Density: 63.3/km^{2} (164/sq mi)
- Time zone: UTC+01:00 (CET)
  - Summer (DST): UTC+02:00 (CEST)
- INSEE/Postal code: 26097 /26270
- ^{1} French Land Register data, which excludes lakes, ponds, glaciers > 1 km^{2} (0.386 sq mi or 247 acres) and river estuaries.

Cliousclat (French pronunciation: [klijuskla]; Occitan: Cliosclat) is a commune in the Drôme department in southeastern France.

== Population ==
Historical population
Year	Pop.	±% p.a.
1968	344	—
1975	356	+0.49%
1982	413	+2.14%
1990	558	+3.83%
1999	641	+1.55%
2007	621	−0.40%
2012	651	+0.95%
2017	638	−0.40%
2023	611	−0.72%
Source: INSEE

== See also ==
- Communes of the Drôme department
