= Mirmande =

Mirmande Mirmanda (Occitan)
- Commune
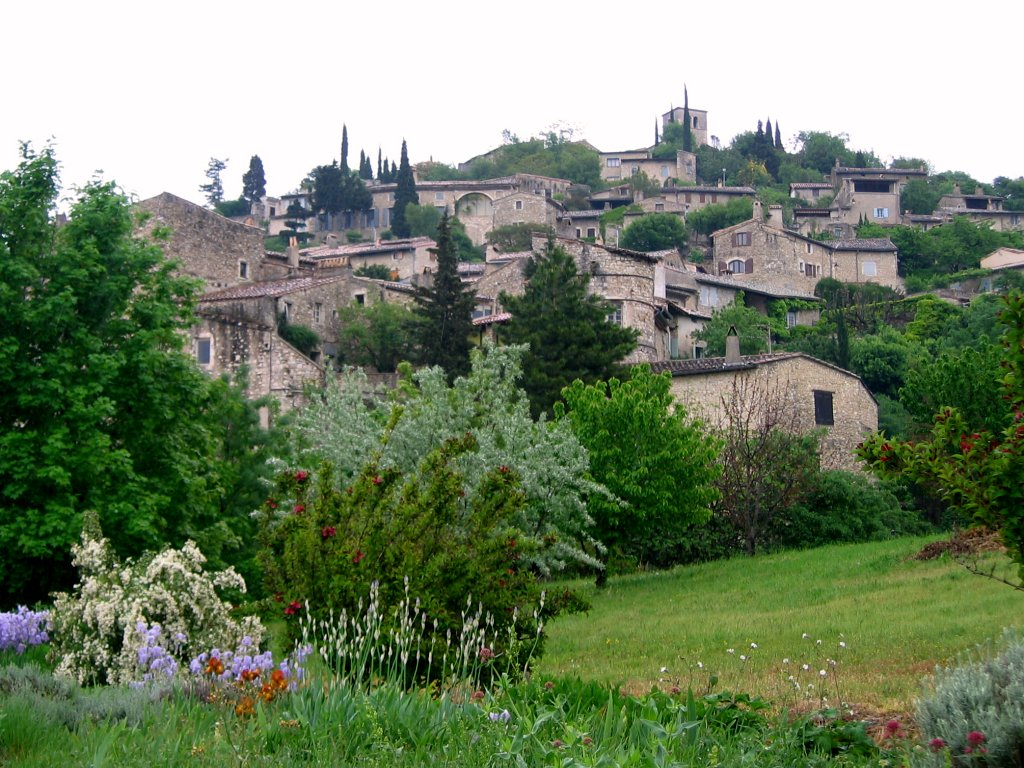
- A general view of Mirmande
- Location of Mirmande
- Location within France Location within Auvergne-Rhône-Alpes
- Coordinates: 44°41′57″N 4°50′10″E
- Country: France
- Region: Auvergne-Rhône-Alpes
- Department: Drôme
- Arrondissement: Die
- Canton: Loriol-sur-Drôme
- Intercommunality: CC du Val de Drôme en Biovallée

Government
  - Mayor (2020–2026): Benoît Maclin
- Area^{1}: 26.45 km^{2} (10.21 sq mi)
- Elevation: 148 m (486 ft)
- Highest elevation: 584 m (1,916 ft)
- Lowest elevation: 87 m (285 ft)
- Population (2023): 611
  - Density: 23.1/km^{2} (59.8/sq mi)
- Demonym: Mirmandais
- Time zone: UTC+01:00 (CET)
  - Summer (DST): UTC+02:00 (CEST)
- INSEE/Postal code: 26185 /26270
- Website: mirmande.org
- ^{1} French Land Register data, which excludes lakes, ponds, glaciers > 1 km^{2} (0.386 sq mi or 247 acres) and river estuaries.

Mirmande (French pronunciation: [miʁmɑ̃d]; Occitan: Mirmanda) is a commune in the Drôme department in the Auvergne-Rhône-Alpes region in Southeastern France. A member of the association Les Plus Beaux Villages de France, it is located 17 km (10.5 mi) north-northeast of Montélimar.

== Population ==
Historical population
Year	Pop.	±% p.a.
1968	459	—
1975	407	−1.70%
1982	420	+0.45%
1990	497	+2.13%
1999	503	+0.13%
2007	502	−0.02%
2012	504	+0.08%
2017	585	+3.03%
2023	611	+0.73%
Source: INSEE

== See also ==
- Communes of the Drôme department
