= 1910 French legislative election =

- 24 April 1910 (first round); 8 May 1910 (second round)

All 587 seats in the Chamber of Deputies 294 seats needed for a majority
- Registered: 11,426,736
- Turnout: 77.41%
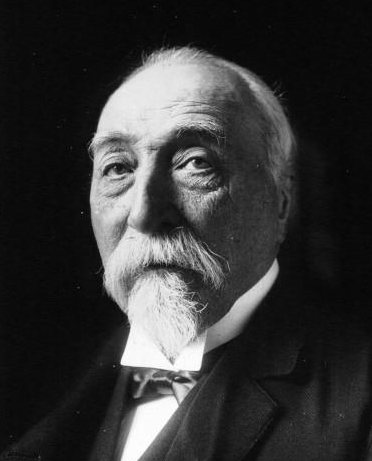

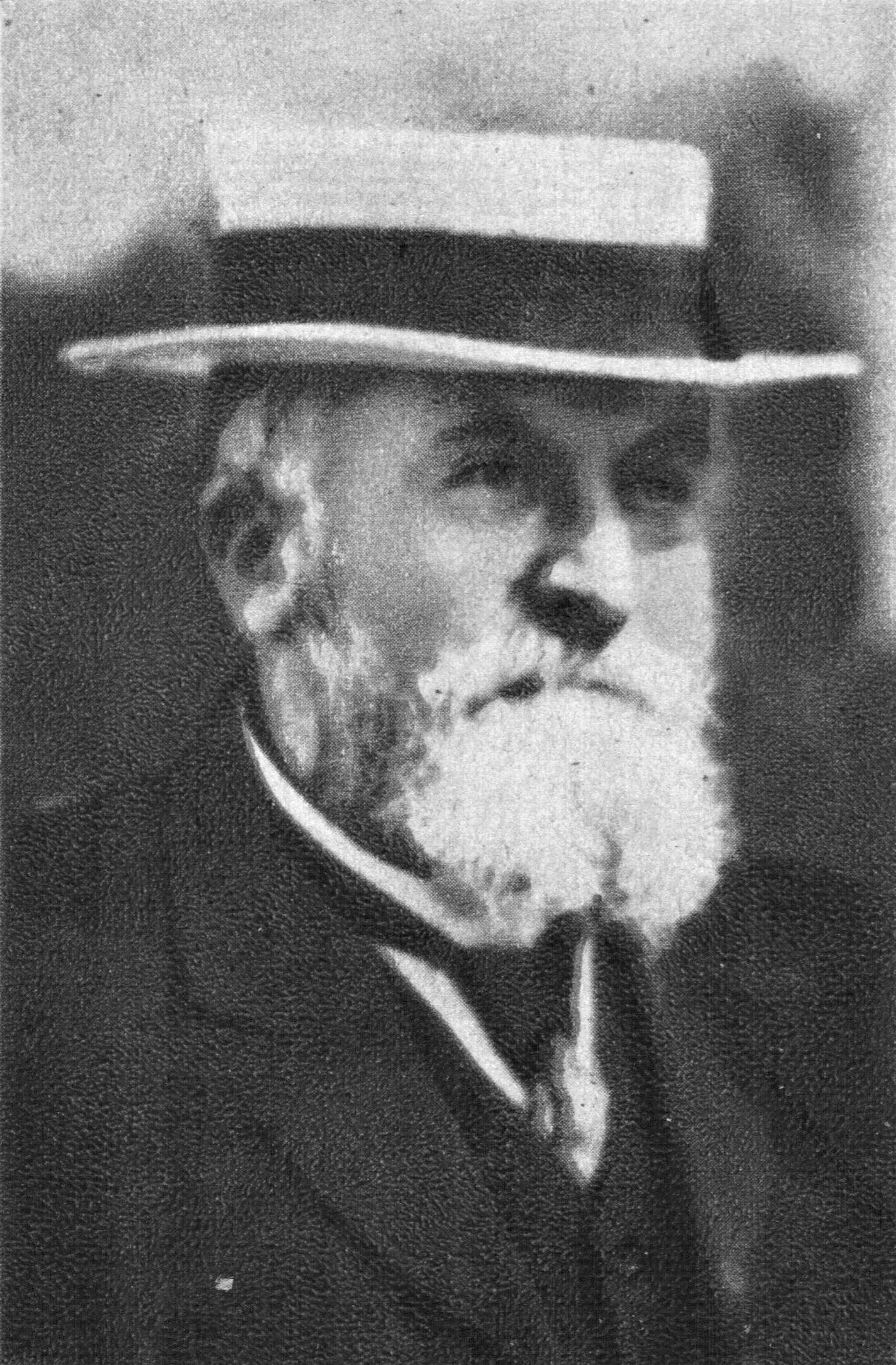
	Majority party	Minority party
Leader	Émile Combes	Jean Jaurès
Party	PRV	SFIO
Seats won	148	75
Seat change	▲16	▲21
Popular vote	1,727,064	1,110,561
Percentage	20.45%	13.15%
Swing	▼8.08pp	▲2.96pp
Prime Minister before election
Aristide Briand
Independent Socialist
Elected Prime Minister
Aristide Briand
Independent Socialist

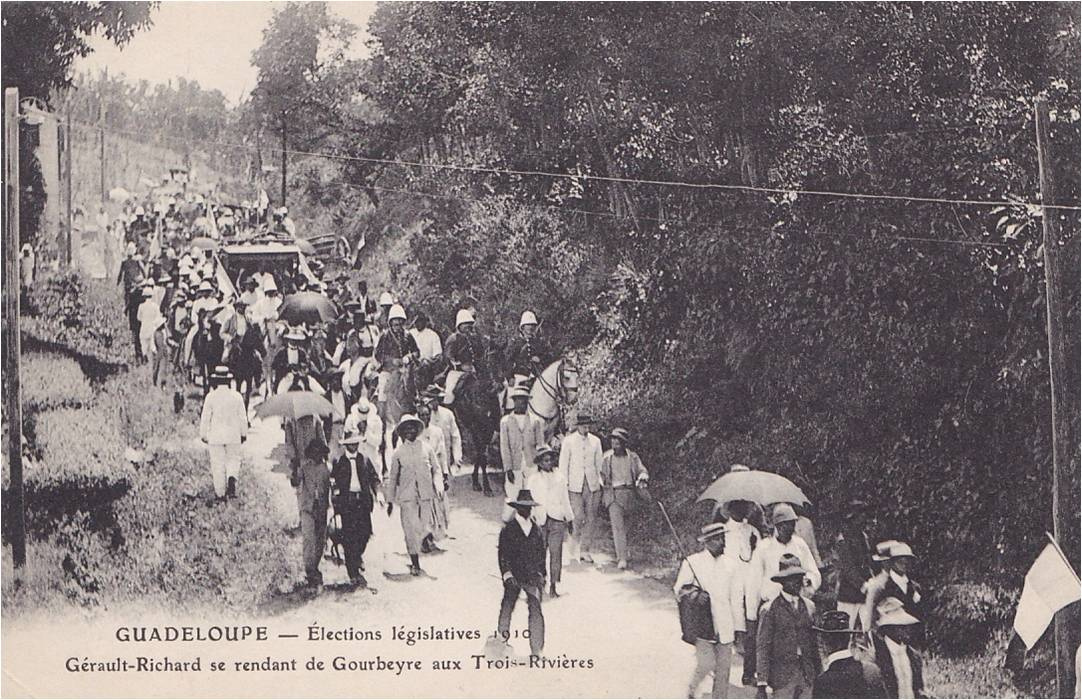
Voters going to the polls in Guadeloupe

Legislative elections were held in France on 24 April and 8 May 1910. The elections resulted in a clear victory for the forces of electoral reform and the governing coalition of Radicals, Independent Socialists and Left Republicans, allowing the incumbent premier Aristide Briand to form his second government.

Briand, himself an Independent Socialist, would unite his small, loosely-aligned, pro-government faction of socialists and radicals into the Republican-Socialist Party in 1911.

== Results ==
Party	Votes	%	Seats
Radical Socialists	1,727,064	20.45	148
Conservatives	1,602,209	18.97	86
Republican Union	1,472,442	17.43	116
French Section of the Workers' International	1,110,561	13.15	75
Republican Left	1,018,704	12.06	70
Independent Radicals	966,407	11.44	60
Independent Socialists	345,202	4.09	25
Popular Liberal Action	153,231	1.81	5
Others	49,953	0.59	2
Total	8,445,773	100.00	587
Valid votes	8,445,773	95.49	
Invalid/blank votes	399,205	4.51	
Total votes	8,844,978	100.00	
Registered voters/turnout	11,426,736	77.41	
Source: Mackie & Rose, France Politique

== Sources ==
- L'Humanité 25 April 1910: Popular Vote
- Le Matin 27 April 1910: Popular Vote
- Le Matin 10 May 1910: Seats
- https://www.france-politique.fr/elections-legislatives-1910.htm
