= Allex, Drôme =

Allex
- Commune
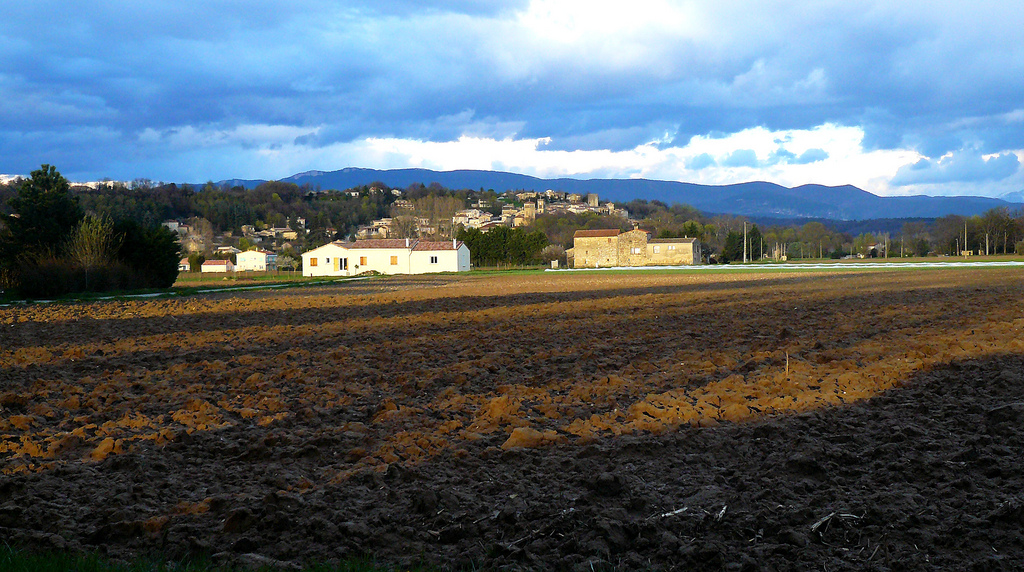
- A general view of Allex

- Coat of arms
- Location of Allex
- Location within France Location within Auvergne-Rhône-Alpes
- Coordinates: 44°45′53″N 4°55′03″E
- Country: France
- Region: Auvergne-Rhône-Alpes
- Department: Drôme
- Arrondissement: Die
- Canton: Loriol-sur-Drôme
- Intercommunality: Val de Drôme en Biovallée

Government
  - Mayor (2020–2026): Gérard Crozier
- Area^{1}: 20.17 km^{2} (7.79 sq mi)
- Highest elevation: 220 m (720 ft)
- Lowest elevation: 124 m (407 ft)
- Population (2023): 2,698
  - Density: 133.8/km^{2} (346.4/sq mi)
- Time zone: UTC+01:00 (CET)
  - Summer (DST): UTC+02:00 (CEST)
- INSEE/Postal code: 26006 /26400
- ^{1} French Land Register data, which excludes lakes, ponds, glaciers > 1 km^{2} (0.386 sq mi or 247 acres) and river estuaries.

Allex (French pronunciation: [alɛks]) is a commune near Crest in the Drôme department in southeastern France. The river Drôme runs nearby.

== Population ==
Historical population
Year	Pop.	±% p.a.
1968	1,219	—
1975	1,179	−0.48%
1982	1,487	+3.37%
1990	1,704	+1.72%
1999	2,009	+1.85%
2007	2,413	+2.32%
2012	2,474	+0.50%
2017	2,515	+0.33%
2023	2,698	+1.18%
Source: INSEE

== See also ==
- Communes of the Drôme department
