= Jacques Piou =

French politician

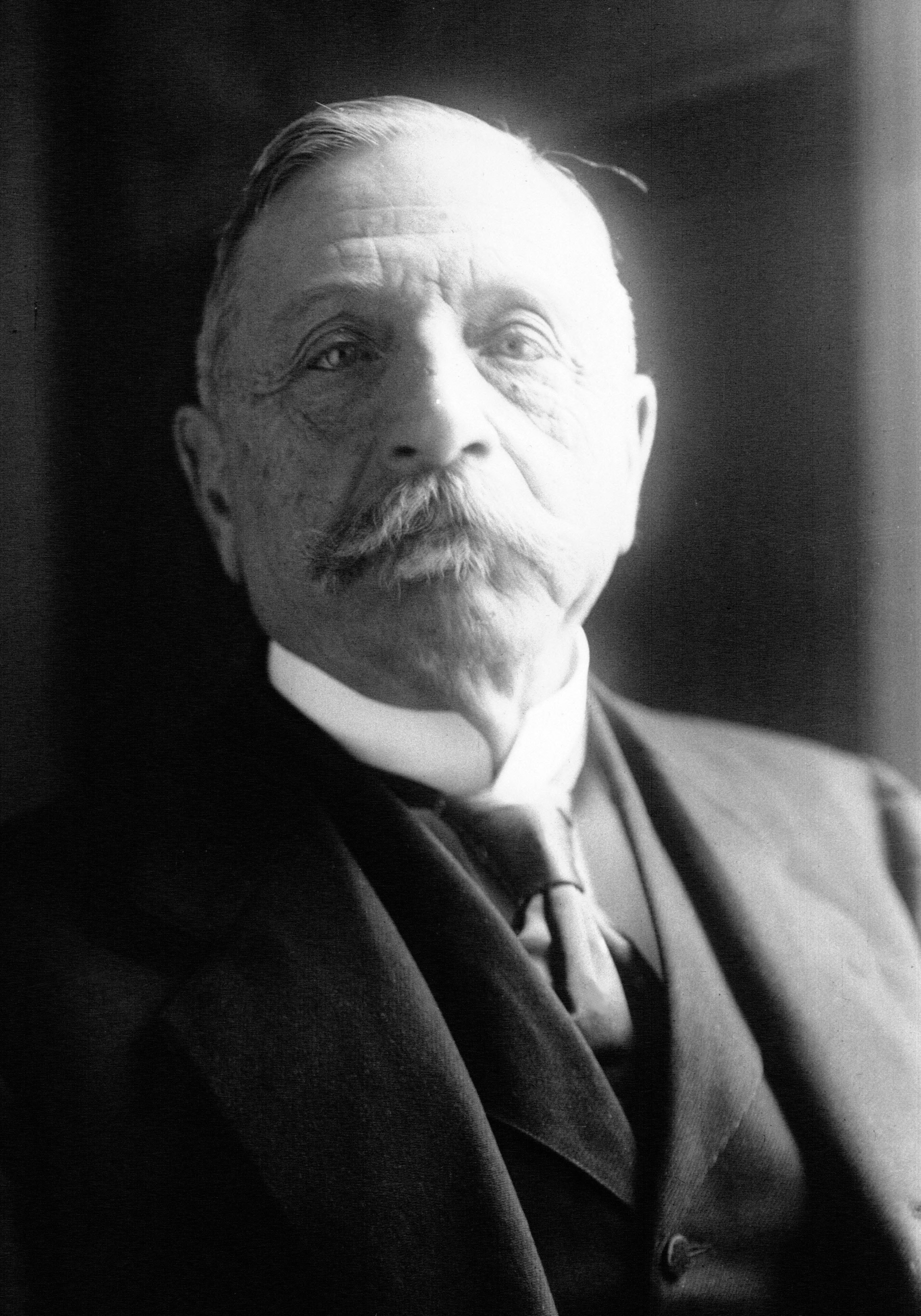
- Jacques Piou in 1913
- Born: Jacques Gustave Piou; 6 August 1838; Angers, Maine-et-Loire, Pays de la Loire, France
- Died: 12 May 1932 (aged 93); Paris, France
- Political party: Popular Liberal Action
- Spouse: Julie Gentien
- Children: Léonie Thérèse Piou
- Parent(s): Constance Piou; Thérèse Angèle Palmyre Ledall de Kéréon

Jacques Piou (1838-1932) was a French lawyer and politician.

== Early life ==
Jacques Piou was born on 6 August 1838 in Angers, France. His father, Constance Piou, was a politician. His mother, Thérèse Angèle Palmyre Ledall de Kéréon, was an aristocrat.

He studied the Law.

== Career ==
Piou started his career as a lawyer in Toulouse. Politically Piou initially supported Royalism and later General Georges Ernest Boulanger, before supporting the Third Republic following Pope Leo XIII's policy of ralliement following his encyclical Au milieu des sollicitudes.

He served as a member of the Chamber of Deputies for Haute-Garonne from 1885 to 1893, and from 1898 to 1902. He co-founded Popular Liberal Action, a conservative political party, with Count Albert de Mun in 1901. He then served for Lozère from 1906 to 1919.

He authored a biography of Count Albert de Mun that was published in 1925.

== Personal life ==
He married Julie Gentien. They had a daughter, Léonie Thérèse Piou.

== Death ==
He died on 12 May 1932 in Paris.
