= Armorial of France =

List of French coats of arms

This gallery of French coats of arms shows the coats of arms of the Provinces, Regions, and Departments of France and certain French cities. They are used to visually identify historical and present-day regions, as well as cities, within France.

== National ==
Unlike the tricolor flag, the coat of arms of the French Republic is not enshrined in Article 2 of the Constitution of France. However, diplomatic emblems are used. The first version was created in 1905 and later used to represent France at the United Nations, but it still needs to update. A second version, featuring an uncommon pelta (bouclier en forme de croissantPeltast#pelte) shield and oak leaves, is today widely used by the Presidency of the Republic and by the Ministry of Foreign Affairs. This version appears on the cover of French passports.

Unofficial

Unofficial

Unofficial (current diplomatic emblem)

== Regions ==
Auvergne-Rhône-Alpes

Bourgogne-Franche-Comté

Bretagne

Centre-Val de Loire

Corse

Grand Est

Hauts-de-France

Île-de-France

Normandy

Nouvelle-Aquitaine

Occitanie

Pays de la Loire

Provence-Alpes-Cote-d'Azur

Guadeloupe

Martinique

Guyane

Réunion

Mayotte

== Former regions ==
Alsace

Aquitaine

Auvergne

Bourgogne

Bretagne

Centre

Champagne-Ardenne

Corse

Franche-Comté

Île-de-France

Languedoc-Roussillon

Limousin

Lorraine

Midi-Pyrénées

Nord-Pas-de-Calais

Basse-Normandie

Haute-Normandie

Pays-de-Loire

Picardie

Poitou-Charentes

Provence-Alpes-Cote-d'Azur

Rhone-Alpes

== Departments ==
01 Ain

02 Aisne

03 Allier

04 Alpes-de-Haute-Provence

05 Hautes-Alpes

06 Alpes-Maritimes

07 Ardèche

08 Ardennes

09 Ariège

10 Aube

11 Aude

12 Aveyron

13 Bouches-du-Rhône

14 Calvados

15 Cantal

16 Charente

17 Charente-Maritime

18 Cher

19 Corrèze

20 Corse

21 Côte-d'Or

22 Côtes-d'Armor

23 Creuse

24 Dordogne

25 Doubs

26 Drôme

27 Eure

28 Eure-et-Loir

29 Finistère

30 Gard

31 Haute-Garonne

32 Gers

33 Gironde

34 Hérault

35 Ille-et-Vilaine

36 Indre

37 Indre-et-Loire

38 Isère

39 Jura

40 Landes

41 Loir-et-Cher

42 Loire

43 Haute-Loire

44 Loire-Atlantique
Blason non officiel

45 Loiret

46 Lot

47 Lot-et-Garonne

48 Lozère

49 Maine-et-Loire

50 Manche See:Armorial of the Communes of Manche

51 Marne

52 Haute-Marne

53 Mayenne

54 Meurthe-et-Moselle

55 Meuse

56 Morbihan

57 Moselle

58 Nièvre

59 Nord See:Armorial of the Communes of Nord

60 Oise See:Armorial of the Communes of Oise

61 Orne

62 Pas-de-Calais

63 Puy-de-Dôme

64 Pyrénées-Atlantiques

65 Hautes-Pyrénées

66 Pyrénées-Orientales

67 Bas-Rhin

68 Haut-Rhin

69 Rhône

70 Haute-Saône

71 Saône-et-Loire

72 Sarthe

73 Savoie

74 Haute-Savoie

75 Paris

76 Seine-Maritime See:Armorial of the Communes of Seine-Maritime

77 Seine-et-Marne

78 Yvelines

79 Deux-Sèvres

80 Somme

81 Tarn

82 Tarn-et-Garonne

83 Var

84 Vaucluse

85 Vendée See:Armorial of the Communes of Vendée

86 Vienne

87 Haute-Vienne

88 Vosges

89 Yonne

90 Belfort

91 Essonne

92 Hauts-de-Seine

93 Seine-Saint-Denis

94 Val-de-Marne

95 Val-d'Oise

971 Guadeloupe

972 Martinique

973 Guyane

974 Réunion

976 Mayotte

== Collectivities ==
975 Saint Pierre and Miquelon

977 Saint Barthélemy

986 Wallis and Futuna

987 French Polynesia

== Uninhabited territories ==
984 French Southern and Antarctic Lands

== Large cities ==
Aix-en-Provence

Angers

Avignon

Besançon

Bordeaux

Béziers

Brest

Caen

Clermont-Ferrand

Dijon

Grenoble

Lille

Lyon

Marseille

Metz

Montpellier

Mulhouse

Nancy

Nantes

Nice

Nîmes

Orléans

Paris

Rennes

Roubaix

Rouen

Saint-Denis

Saint-Étienne

Strasbourg

Toulon

Toulouse

Tours

Troyes

== Historical regions ==
Alsace

Angoumois

Anjou

Artois

Aunis

Auvergne

Lower Navarre

Béarn

Beaujolais

Berry

Bourbonnais

Brittany

Burgundy

Champagne

Corsica

Dauphiné

Flanders

Foix

Forez

Franche-Comté

Gascony

Guyenne

French Hainaut

Île-de-France

Languedoc

Limousin

Lorraine and Barrois

Lyonnais

Maine

Marche

Nice

Nivernais

Normandy

Orléanais

Perche

Picardy

Poitou

Provence

Roussillon

Saintonge

Savoy

Touraine

Venaissin

== See also ==
- National emblem of France
- Armorial of the Capetian dynasty
