= Prime Minister of France =

Head of government

Prime Minister of the French Republic
- Premier ministre de la République française
- Emblem of the French Republic

- Flag of France

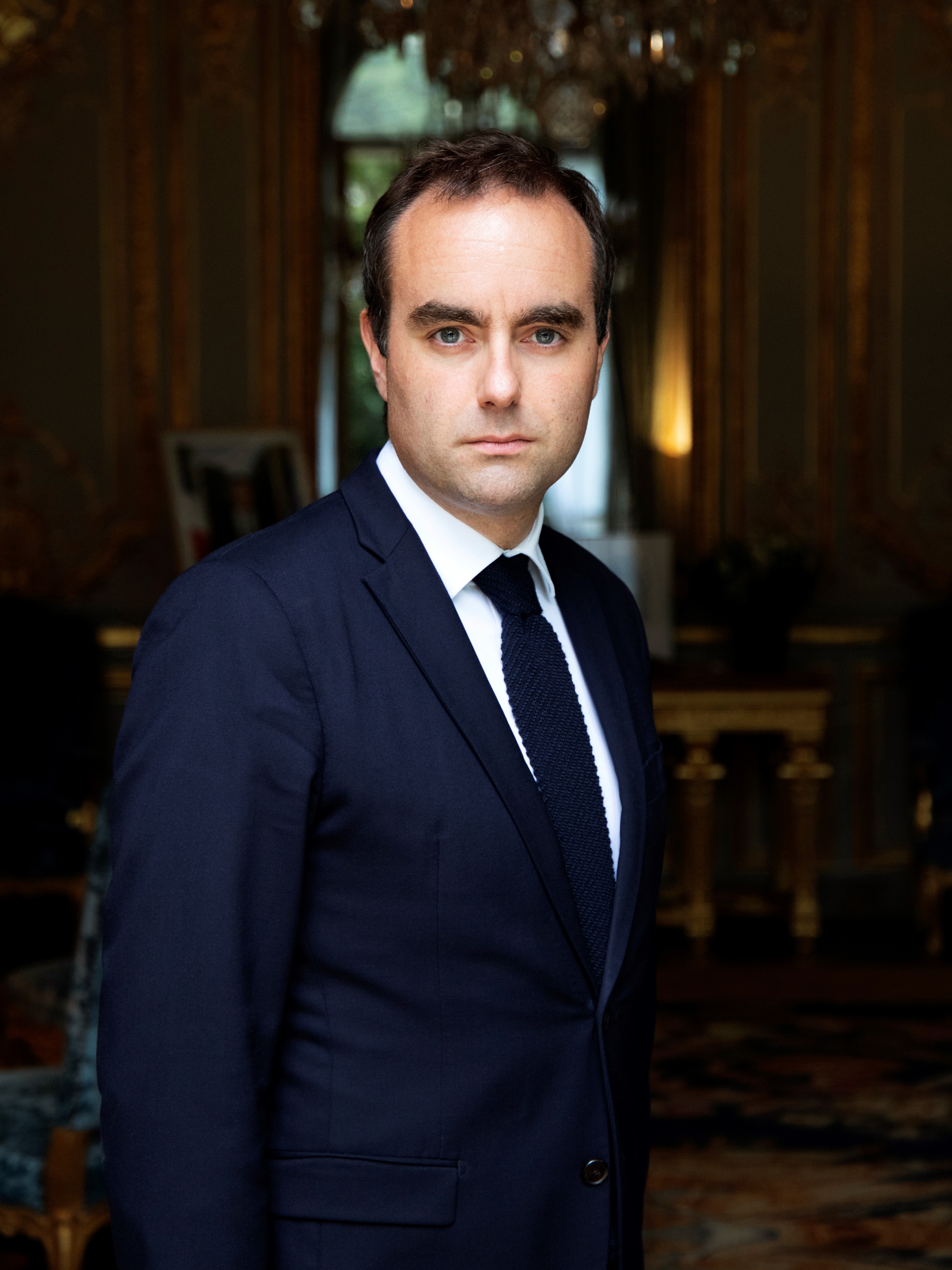
- Incumbent; Sébastien Lecornu since 9 September 2025
- Council of Ministers of the French Republic; Government of France
- Style: Mr. Prime Minister (informal); His Excellency (diplomatic)
- Status: Head of government
- Member of: Council of Ministers; Council of State; National Defence and Security Council
- Reports to: President; Parliament
- Residence: Hôtel Matignon
- Seat: Paris, France
- Appointer: President
- Term length: At the president's pleasure, contingent on the officeholder ability to command parliamentary confidence; No term limits
- Constituting instrument: Constitution of France
- Precursor: Several titles were used since the Ancien Régime
- Inaugural holder: Charles Maurice de Talleyrand-Périgord
- Formation: 9 July 1815; 211 years ago
- Salary: €178,920 annually
- Website: www.gouvernement.fr

The prime minister of France (French: Premier ministre français (Note: pronounced [pʁəmje ministʁ fʁɑ̃sɛ]; feminine form: Première ministre française [pʁəmjɛʀ - fʁɑ̃sɛːz])), officially the prime minister of the French Republic (Premier ministre de la République française (Note: pronounced [- d(ə) la ʁepyblik fʁɑ̃sɛːz]; feminine form: Première ministre ...)), is the head of government of the French Republic. Although the officeholder leads the government, they do not chair meetings of the Council of Ministers, which are instead chaired by the president of France.

The prime minister is the holder of the second-highest office in France, after the president of France. The president appoints the prime minister but cannot dismiss them, only request their resignation. The Government of France, including the prime minister, can be dismissed by the National Assembly. Upon appointment, the prime minister proposes a list of ministers to the president. Decrees and decisions signed by the prime minister, like almost all executive decisions, are subject to the oversight of the administrative court system. Some decrees are taken after advice from the Council of State (Conseil d'État), over which the prime minister is entitled to preside. Ministers defend the programmes of their ministries to the prime minister, who makes budgetary choices. The extent to which those decisions lie with the prime minister or president often depends upon whether they are of the same political party and whether it holds a majority in the National Assembly. If so, the president may serve as both the head of state and de facto head of government, while the prime minister serves as his deputy, acting as a link between the legislature and the executive.

The current prime minister of France is Sébastien Lecornu who was appointed on 9 September 2025 and resigned on 6 October 2025, but was re-appointed on 10 October.

== Nomination ==
The prime minister is appointed by the president of France, who is theoretically free to pick anyone for the post. In practice, because the National Assembly has the power to force the resignation of the government by adopting a motion of no confidence, the choice of prime minister must reflect the will of the majority in the National Assembly. In periods of cohabitation, the prime minister is only responsible to the parliament.

One example of cohabitation includes President François Mitterrand's appointment of Jacques Chirac as prime minister after the legislative election of 1986. While Mitterrand's Socialist Party was the largest party in the National Assembly, it did not have an absolute majority. The Rally for the Republic had an alliance with the Union for French Democracy, which gave them a majority.

While prime ministers are usually chosen from amongst the ranks of the National Assembly, on rare occasions the president has selected a non-officeholder because of experience in bureaucracy or foreign service, or success in business management—former Minister of Foreign Affairs Dominique de Villepin, for example, served as prime minister from 2005 to 2007 without having held elected office.

Although the president's choice of prime minister must be in accordance with the majority in the National Assembly, a prime minister does not have to ask for a vote of confidence after a government formation, having been legitimized by the president's assignment and approval of the government. Prior to the 1958 Constitution, the government was required to pass a motion of confidence upon entering office.

== Role ==
According to article 21 of the Constitution, the prime minister "shall direct the actions of the Government". Additionally, Article 20 stipulates that the government "shall determine and conduct the policy of the Nation", and it includes domestic issues, while the president concentrates on formulating directions on national defense and foreign policy while arbitrating the efficient service of all governmental authorities in France. Other members of the government are appointed by the president "on the recommendation of the prime minister". In practice, the prime minister acts in harmony with the president, except when there is a cohabitation. During cohabitation, according to the Constitutional Council, "the centre of gravity of power shifts from the Élysée to Matignon", with the president losing his status as head of the executive. In such cases, the prime minister traditionally exercises primacy in domestic affairs, while the president limits their action to defense and, to a lesser degree, to foreign affairs.

The prime minister can "engage the responsibility" of the government before the National Assembly. This process consists of placing a bill before the assembly, and either the assembly overthrows the government, or the bill is passed automatically (article 49). In addition to ensuring that the government still has support in the house, some bills that might prove too controversial to pass through the normal assembly rules are able to be passed this way.

The prime minister may also submit a bill that has not been yet signed into law to the Constitutional Council (article 61). Before dissolving the assembly, the president must consult the prime minister and the presidents of both houses of Parliament (article 12). The prime minister is the only member of the government able to introduce legislation in Parliament.

== History ==
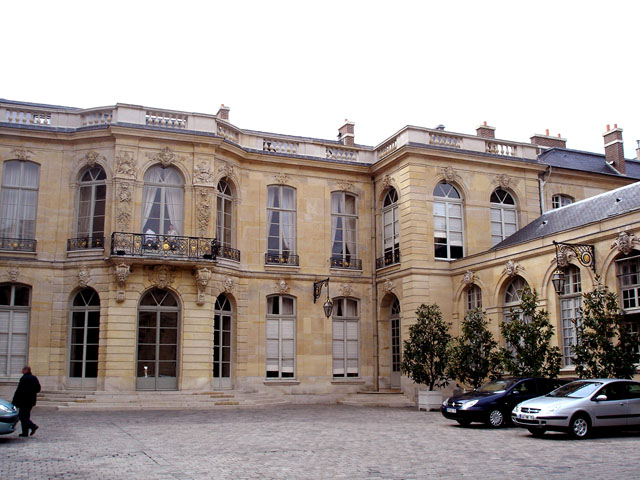
Hôtel Matignon, the official residence of the prime minister

Under the Third Republic, the French Constitutional Laws of 1875 titled the head of government as the "President of the Council of Ministers" (French: Président du Conseil des Ministres), though he was informally called "prime minister" or "premier" outside of France. (Note: the term "President of the Council of Ministers of France" was naming of head of government of France in the Third Republic and Fourth Republic periods, naming "Prime Minister of France" is used since Fifth Republic periods, in fact, naming of Prime Minister of France is used in several political regimes era by the foreign press)

The president of the council was vested with similar formal powers to those of the prime minister of the United Kingdom. In practice, this proved insufficient to command the confidence of France's multi-party parliament. Most notably, the legislature had the power to force the entire cabinet out of office by a vote of censure. As a result, cabinets were often toppled twice a year, and there were long stretches where France was left with only a caretaker government. Under the circumstances, the president of the council was usually a fairly weak figure whose strength was more dependent on charisma than formal powers. Often, he was little more than primus inter pares, and was more the cabinet's chairman than its leader.

After several unsuccessful attempts to strengthen the role in the first half of the twentieth century, a semi-presidential system was introduced under the Fifth Republic. It was at this point that the post was formally named "Prime Minister" and took its present form. The 1958 Constitution includes several provisions intended to strengthen the prime minister's position, for instance by restricting the legislature's power to censure the government. As a result, a prime minister has only been censured twice during the existence of the Fifth Republic: the first such instance occurred in 1962 when Georges Pompidou was toppled over opposition objections to President Charles de Gaulle's effort to have the president popularly elected. At the ensuing 1962 French legislative election, de Gaulle's coalition won an increased majority, and Pompidou was reappointed prime minister. Thereafter, no government lost a motion of no confidence until 2024, when Michel Barnier's minority government was toppled after invoking article 49.3 of the Constitution to adopt the Social Security budget for 2025 without submitting it to a parliamentary vote.

== Living former prime ministers of France ==
As of 7 October 2026, there are 15 living former prime ministers. The most recent death of a former prime minister was that of Édouard Balladur (1993–1995), on 31 August 2026.

Living former prime ministers of France

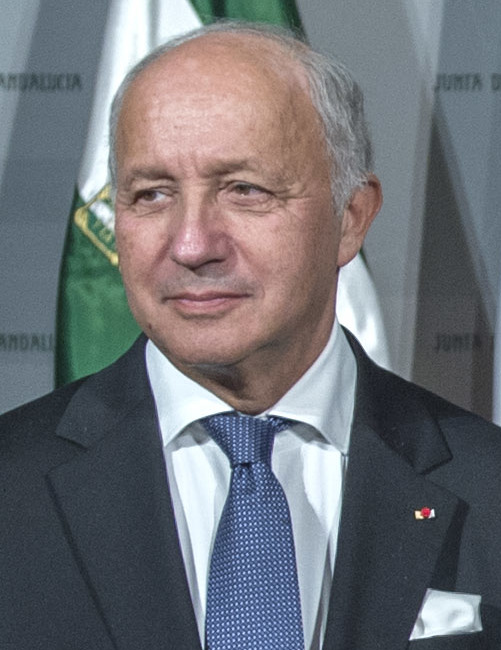
Laurent Fabius
1984–1986
20 August 1946 (age 80)

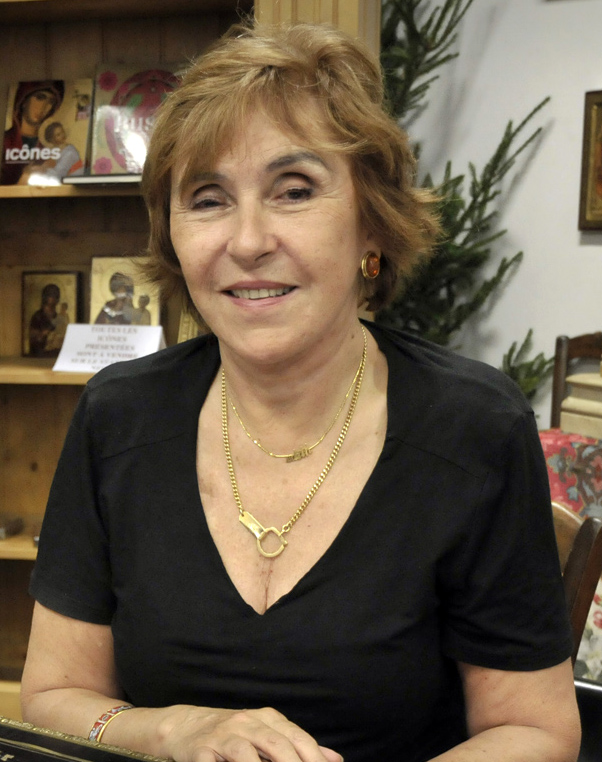
Édith Cresson
1991–1992
27 January 1934 (age 92)

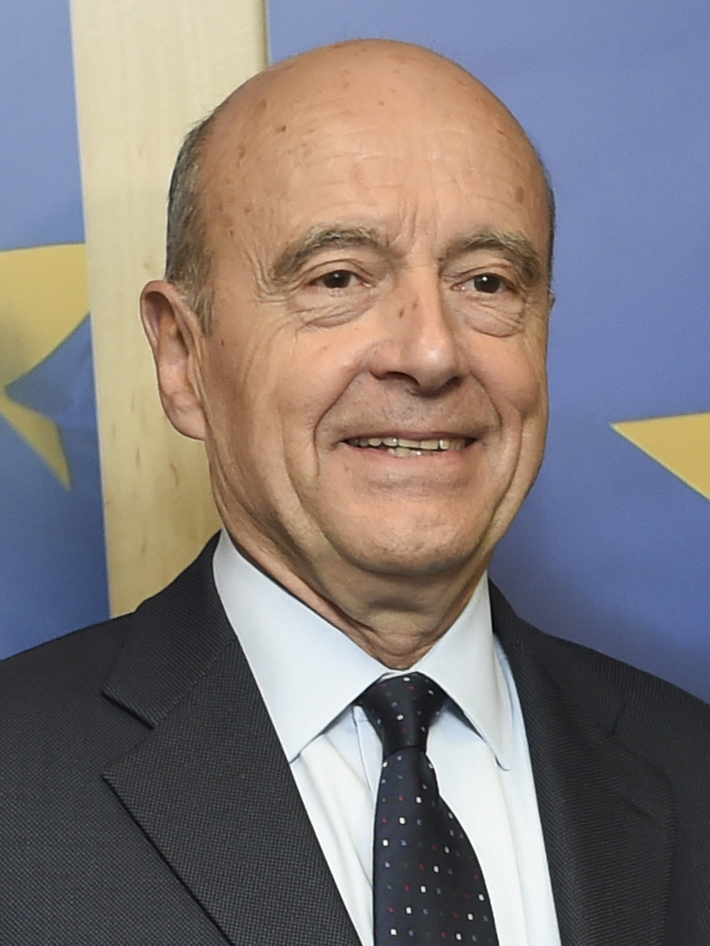
Alain Juppé
1995–1997
12 August 1945 (age 81)

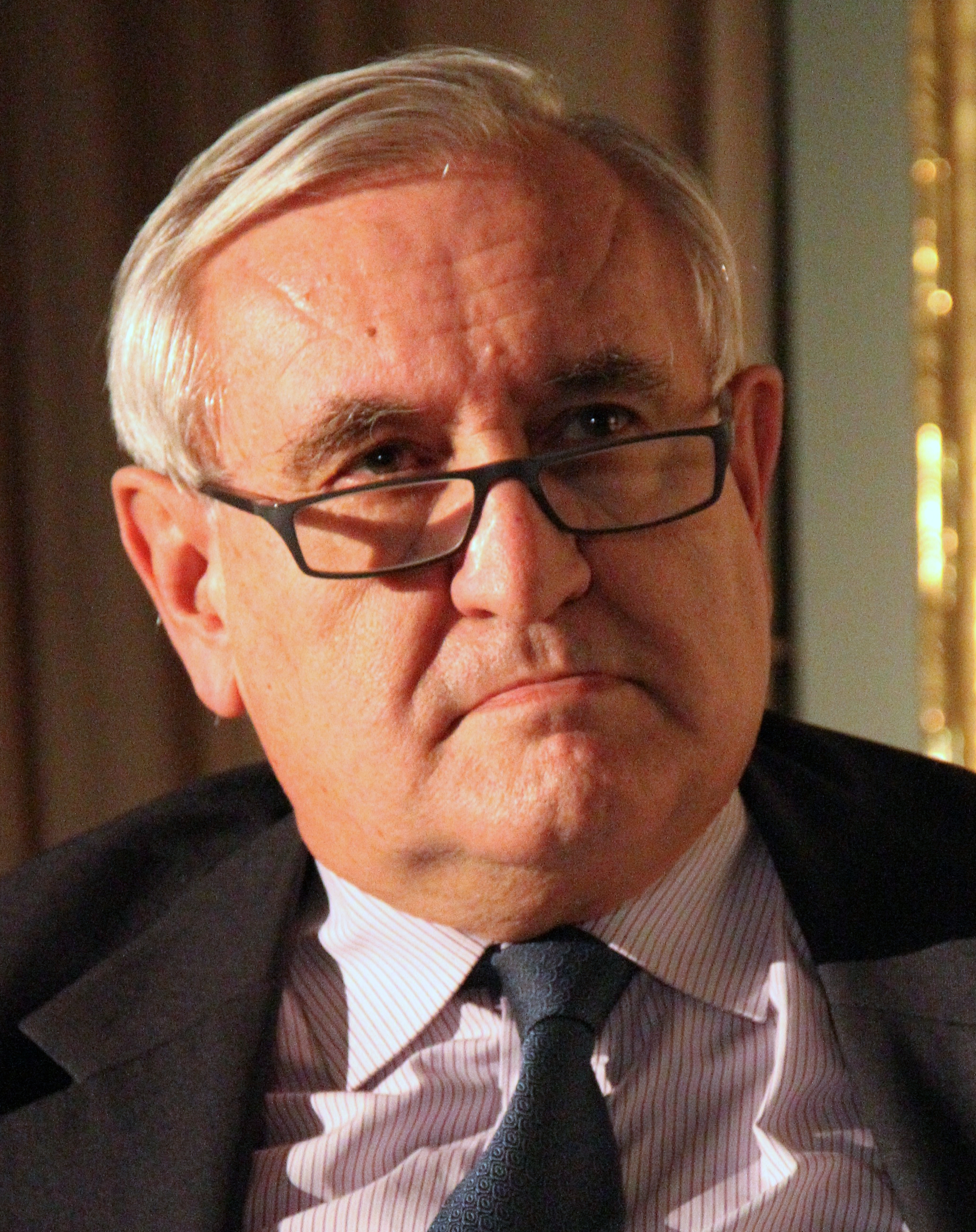
Jean-Pierre Raffarin
2002–2005
3 August 1948 (age 78)

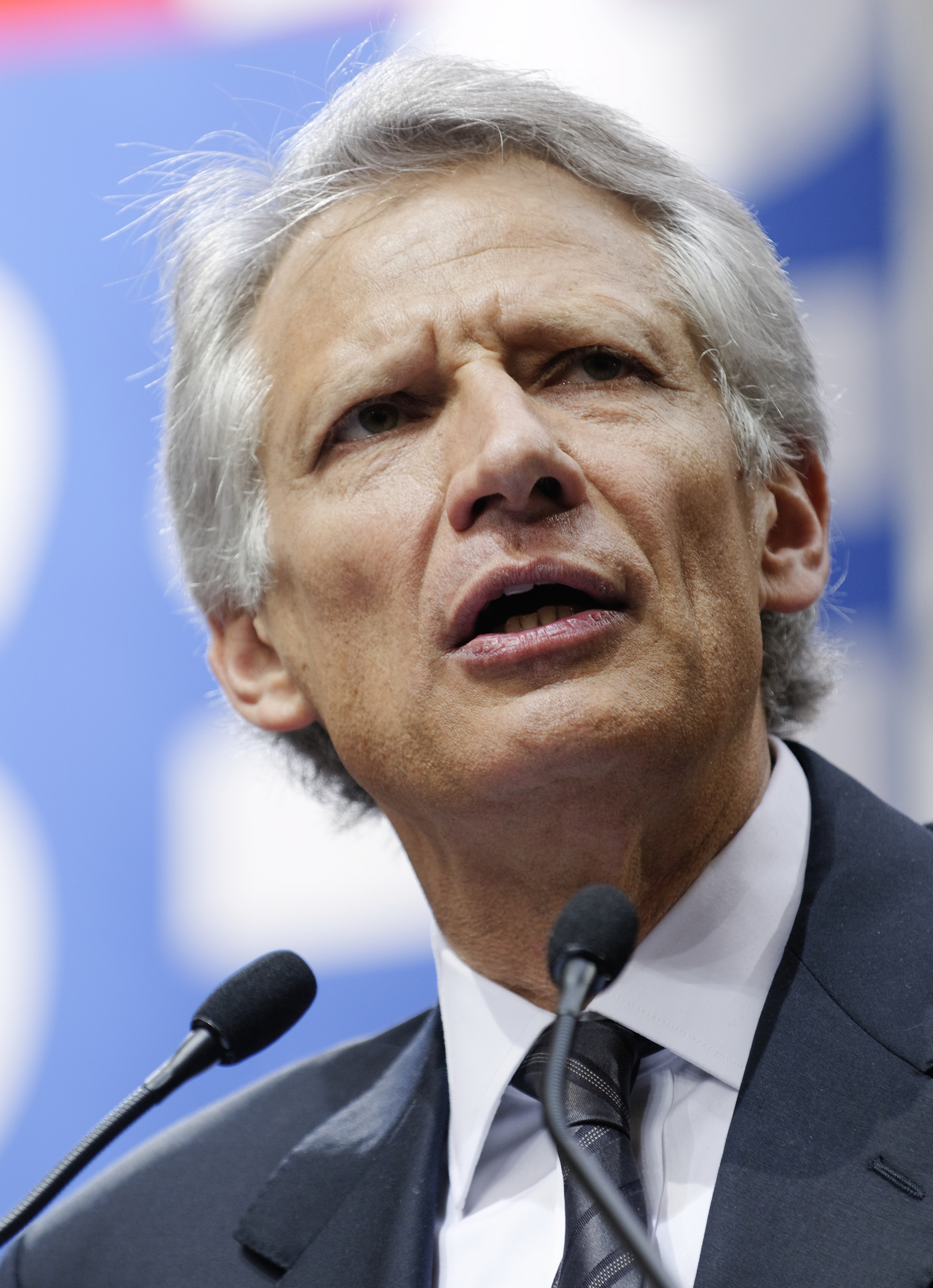
Dominique de Villepin
2005–2007
14 November 1953 (age 72)

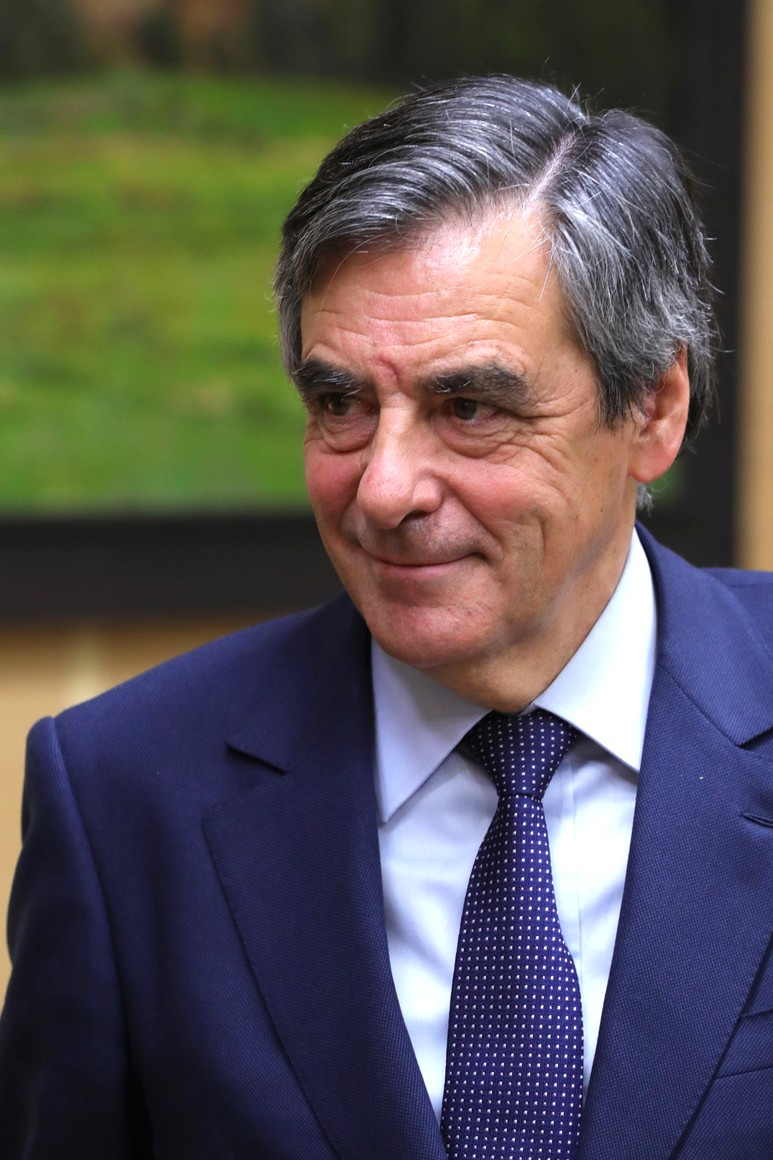
François Fillon
2007–2012
4 March 1954 (age 72)

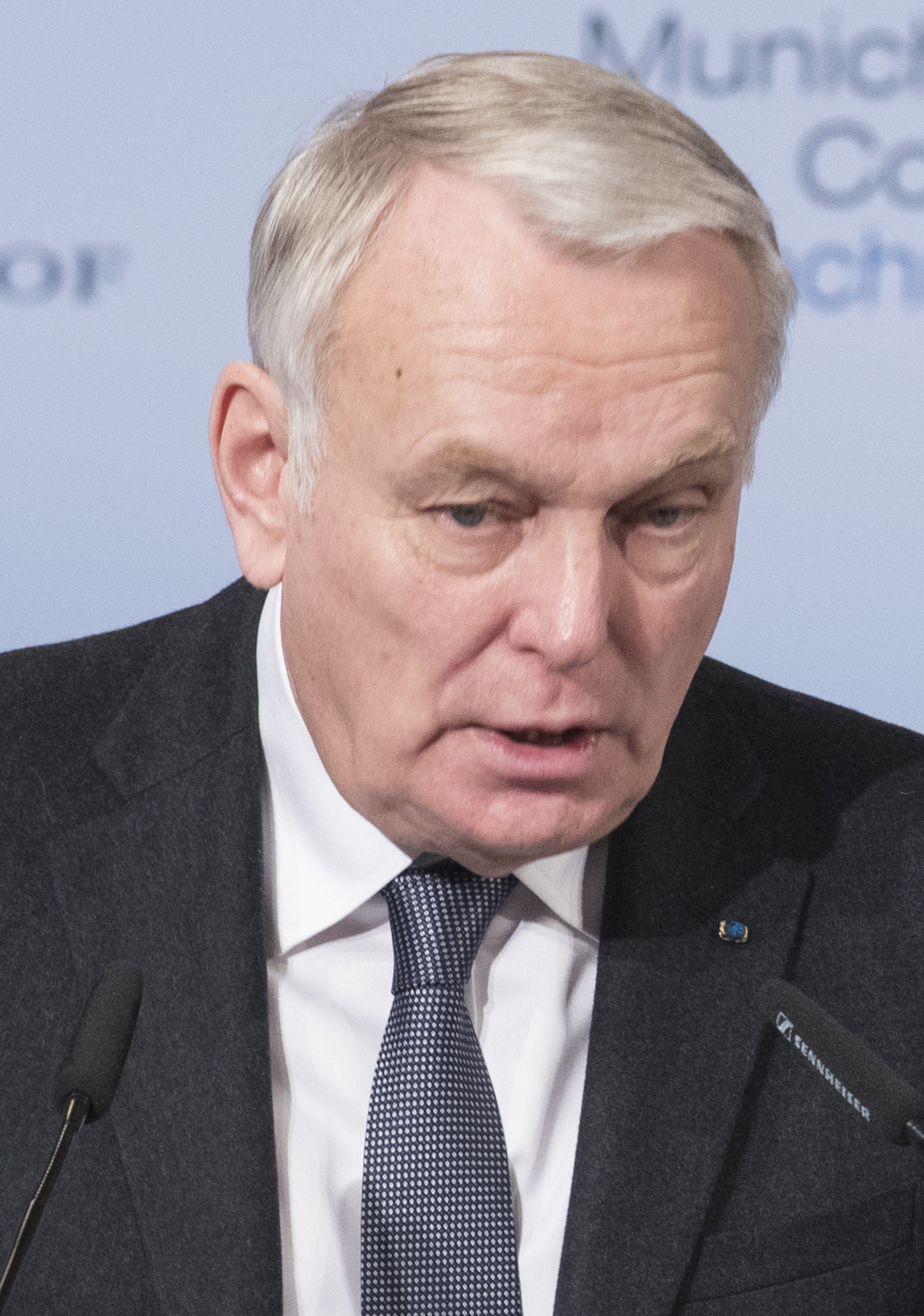
Jean-Marc Ayrault
2012–2014
25 January 1950 (age 76)

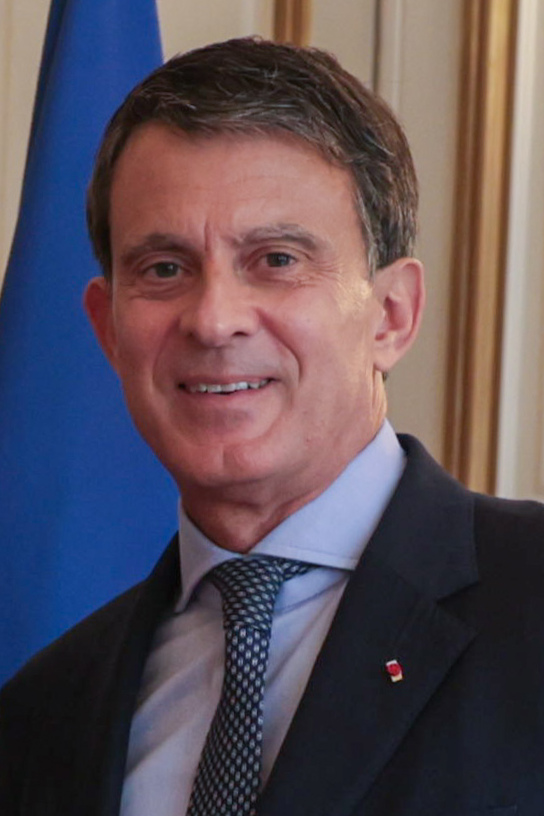
Manuel Valls
2014–2016
13 August 1962 (age 64)

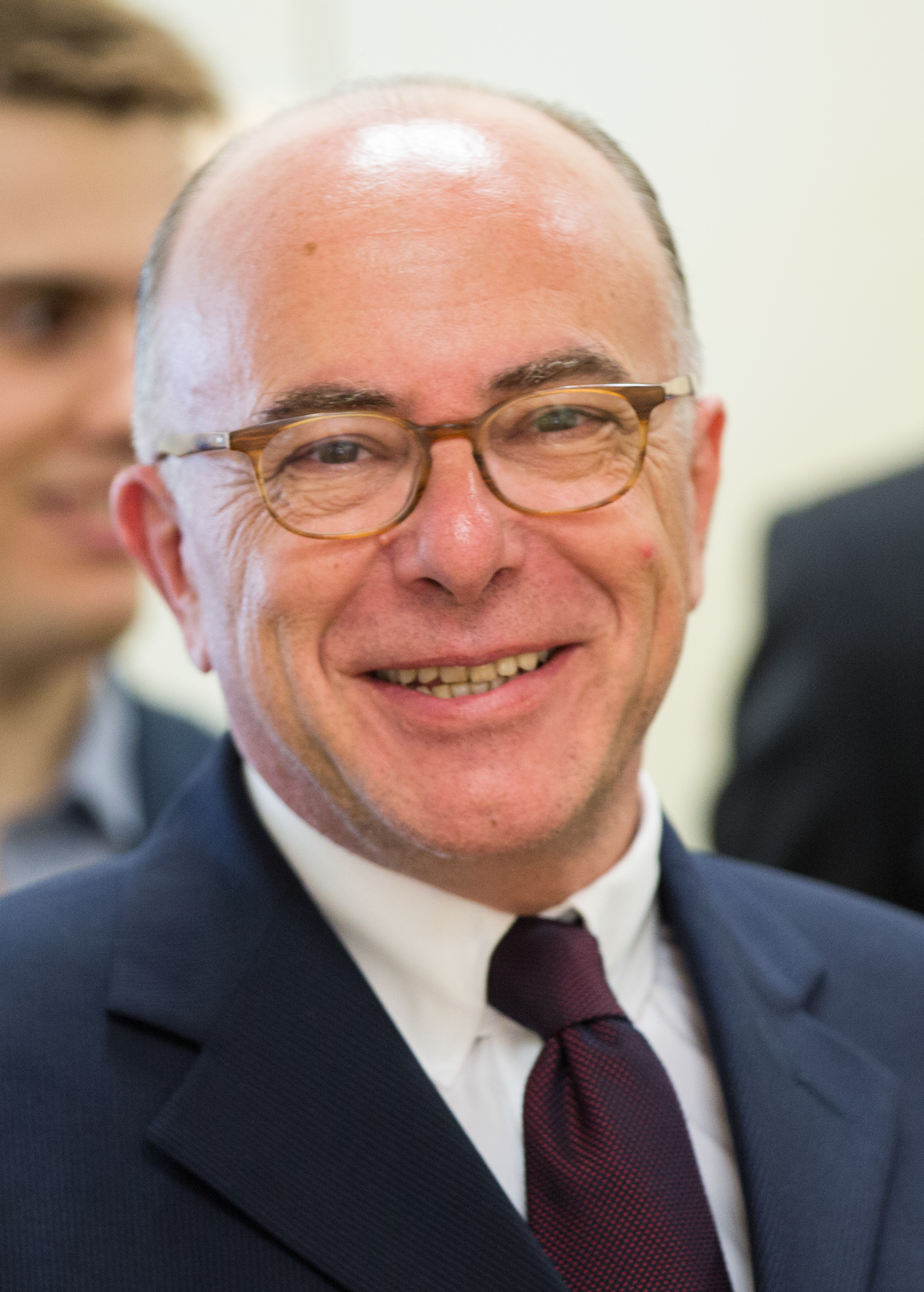
Bernard Cazeneuve
2016–2017
2 June 1963 (age 63)

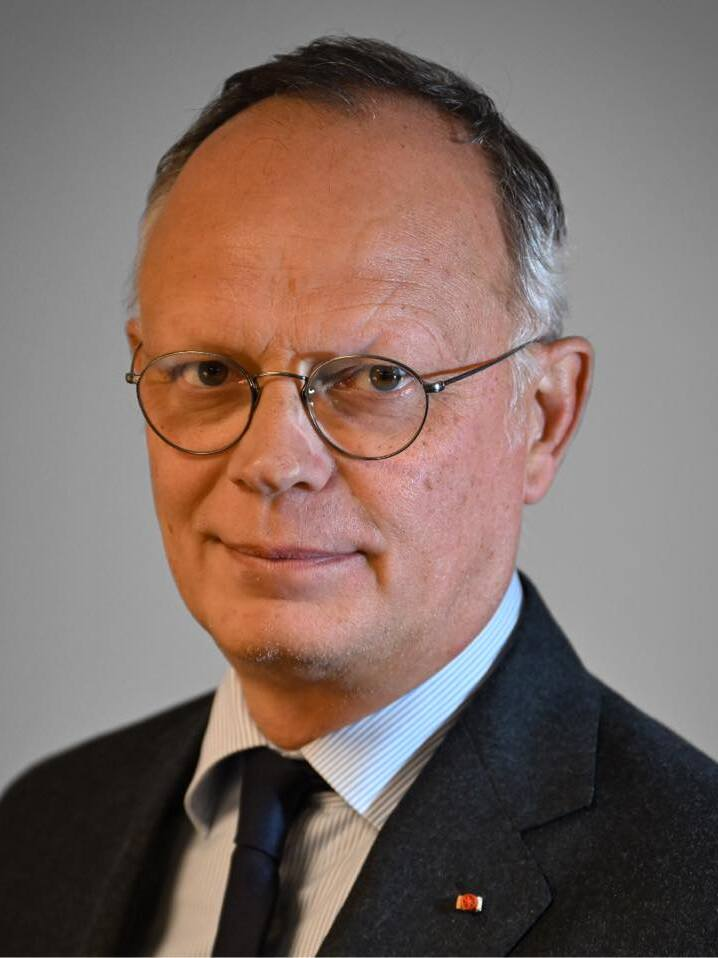
Édouard Philippe
2017–2020
28 November 1970 (age 55)

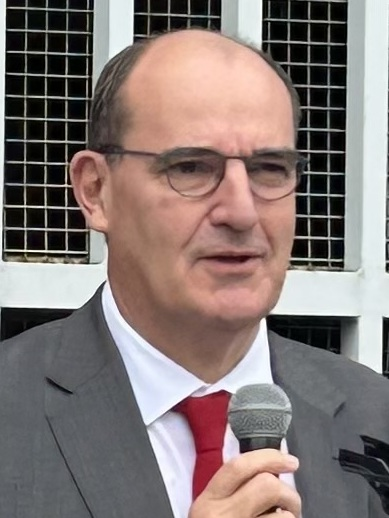
Jean Castex
2020–2022
25 June 1965 (age 61)

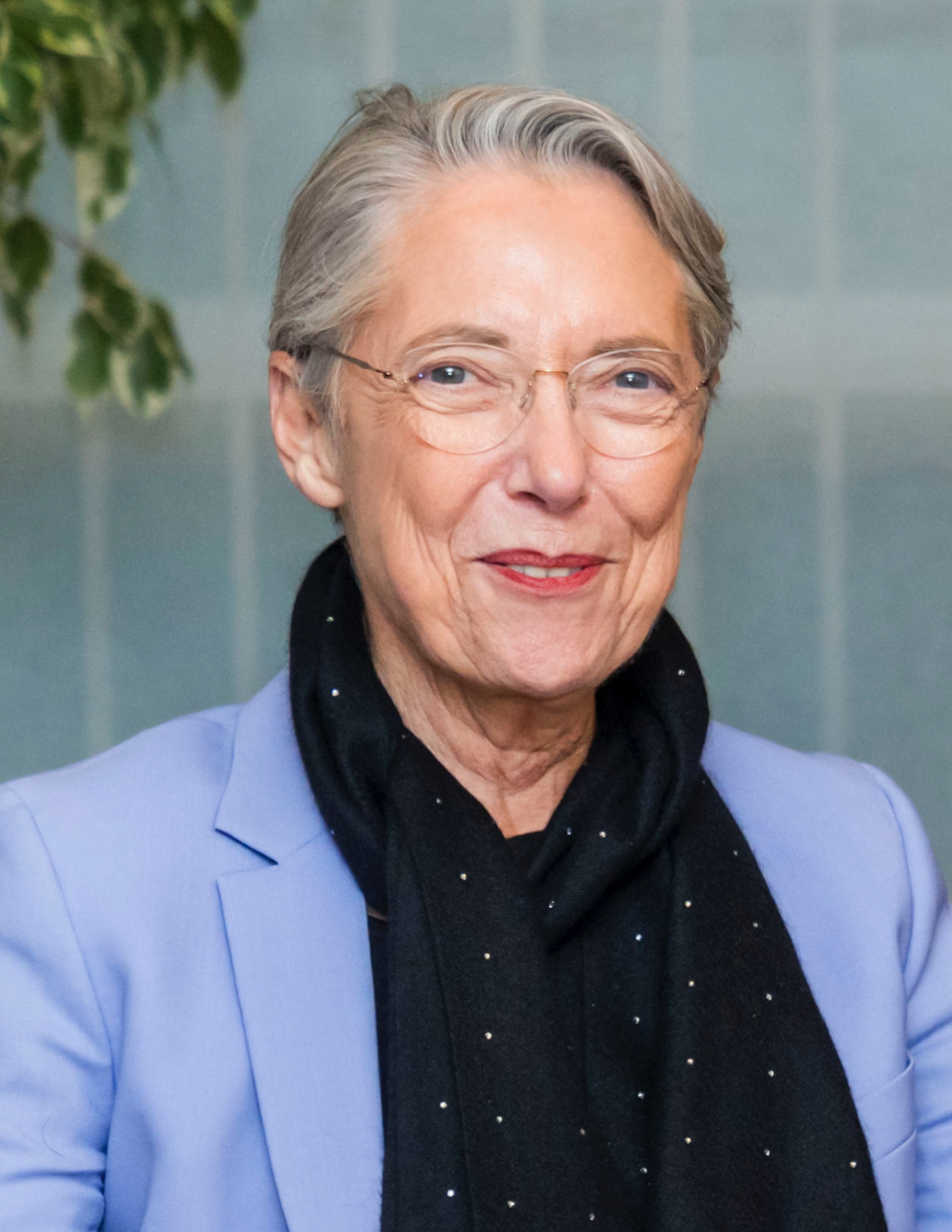
Élisabeth Borne
2022–2024
18 April 1961 (age 65)

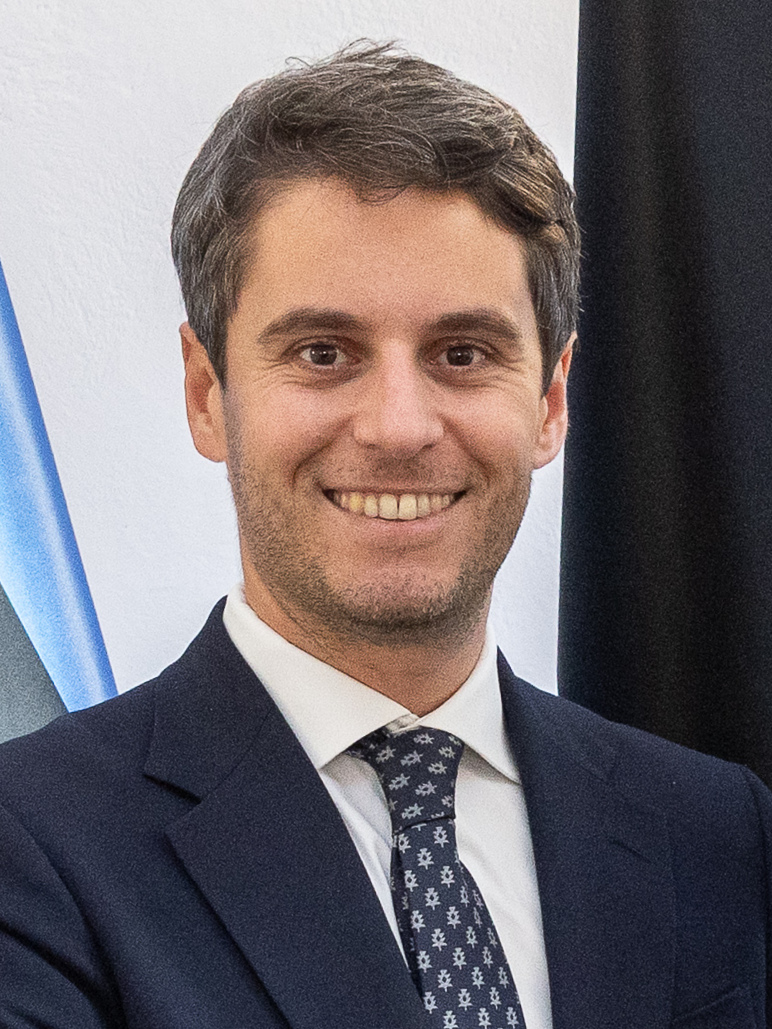
Gabriel Attal
2024
16 March 1989 (age 37)

Michel Barnier
2024
9 January 1951 (age 75)

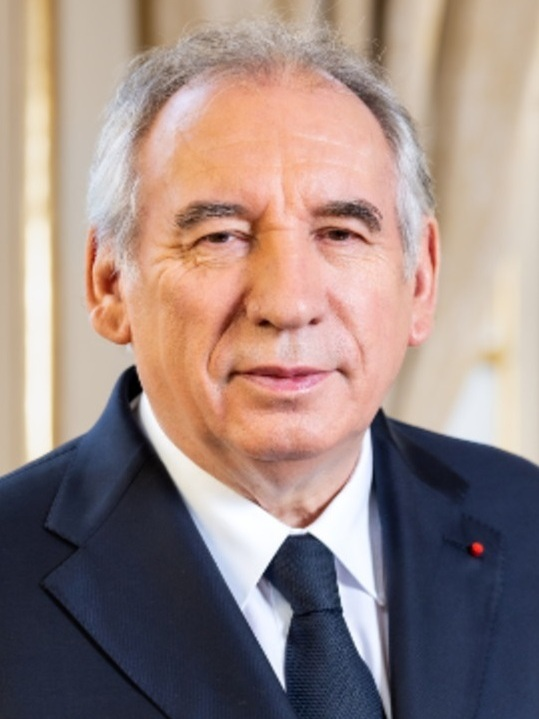
François Bayrou
2024–2025
25 May 1951 (age 75)

== See also ==
- First Minister of State
- List of prime ministers of France
