= National symbols of France =

Overview of French national symbols

National symbols of France are emblems of the French Republic and French people, and they are the cornerstone of the nation's republican tradition.

The national symbols of the French Fifth Republic are:

- The French flag
- The national anthem: "La Marseillaise"
- The national personification: Marianne
- The national motto: Liberté, égalité, fraternité (Liberty, equality, fraternity)
- The national day: Bastille Day (celebrated on 14 July)
- The Gallic rooster
- The lictor's fasces emblem
- The Great Seal of France

Other French symbols include:

- The cockade of France
- The letters "RF", standing for République Française (French Republic)
- The National Order of the Legion of Honour and the National Order of Merit
- The Phrygian cap
- Joan of Arc
- Fleur-de-lis
- Bleuet de France, the symbol of memory for, and solidarity with, veterans, victims of war, widows, and orphans, similar to the Commonwealth remembrance poppy

== Flag ==
Flag of France

The national flag of France (French: drapeau national de la France) is a tricolour featuring three vertical bands coloured blue (hoist side), white, and red. The design was adopted during the French Revolution and has remained the national flag since then, with only minor variations in shade and proportion. The tricolour scheme was later adopted by many other nations in Europe and elsewhere, and, according to the Encyclopædia Britannica, has historically stood "in symbolic opposition to the autocratic and clericalist royal standards of the past".

Before the tricolour was adopted the royal government used many flags, the best known being a blue shield and gold fleurs-de-lis (the Royal Arms of France) on a white background, or state flag. Early in the French Revolution, the Paris militia, which played a prominent role in the storming of the Bastille, wore a cockade of blue and red, the city's traditional colours. According to French general Gilbert du Motier, Marquis de Lafayette, white was the "ancient French colour" and was added to the militia cockade to form a tricolour, or national, cockade of France.

This cockade became part of the uniform of the National Guard, which succeeded the militia and was commanded by Lafayette. The colours and design of the cockade are the basis of the Tricolour flag, adopted in 1790, originally with the red nearest to the flagpole and the blue farthest from it. A modified design by Jacques-Louis David was adopted in 1794. The royal white flag was used during the Bourbon Restoration from 1815 to 1830; the tricolour was brought back after the July Revolution and has been used since then, except for an interruption for a few days in 1848. Since 1974, there have been two versions of the flag in varying levels of use by the state: the original (identifiable by its use of navy blue) and one with a lighter shade of blue. Since July 2020, France has used the older variant by default, including at the Élysée Palace.

== Fleur-de-lis ==
Coat of arms of Paris

Flag of France under the Capetian dynasty since the 12th century

Flag of Quebec, paying homage to French symbols

== Anthem ==
"La Marseillaise" (Note: English pronunciation: /ˌmɑːrseɪˈ(j)ɛz/ MAR-say-(Y)EZ; French: [la maʁsɛjɛːz]) is the national anthem of France. It was written in 1792 by Claude Joseph Rouget de Lisle in Strasbourg after the Kingdom of the French declared war against Austria, and was originally titled "Chant de Guerre pour l'Armée du Rhin" ("War Song for the Army of the Rhine"). (Note: pronounced [ʃɑ̃ də ɡɛːʁ puʁ laʁ.me dy ʁɛ̃])

== Marianne ==
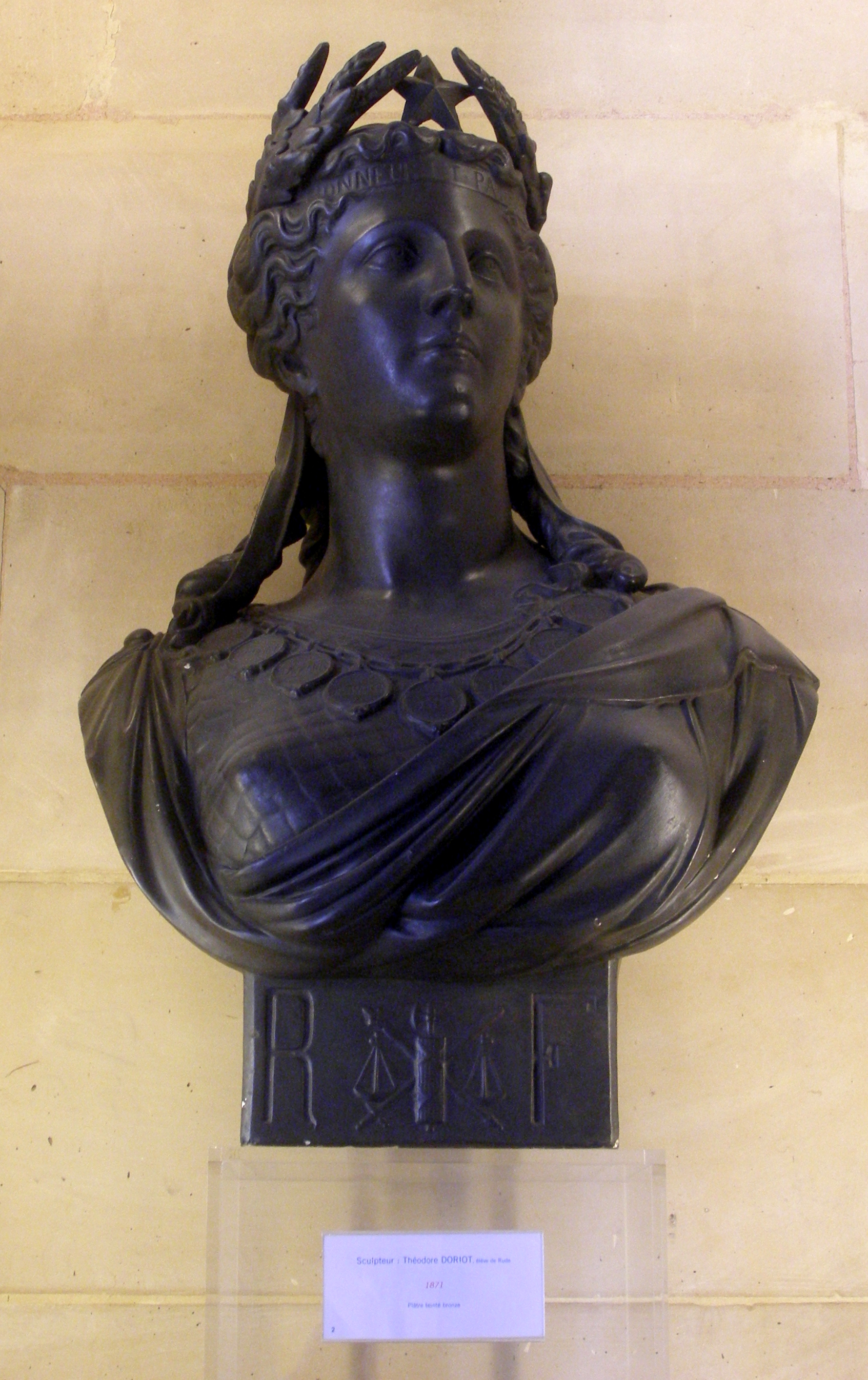
Bust of Marianne

Marianne (French pronunciation: [maʁjan]) has been the national personification of the French Republic since the French Revolution, as an emblem of liberty, equality, fraternity and reason, as well as a portrayal of the Goddess of Liberty.

Marianne is displayed in many places in France and holds a place of honour in town halls and law courts. She is depicted in the Triumph of the Republic, a bronze sculpture overlooking the Place de la Nation in Paris, as well as represented with another Parisian statue on the Place de la République. Her profile stands out on the official government logo of the country, and appears on French euro coins and on French postage stamps. She was also featured on the former franc currency and is officially used on most government documents.

Marianne is a significant republican symbol; her French monarchist equivalent is often Joan of Arc. As a national icon Marianne represents opposition to monarchy and the championship of freedom and democracy against all forms of oppression. Other national symbols of Republican France include the tricolor flag, the national motto Liberté, Égalité, Fraternité, the national anthem "La Marseillaise", the coat of arms, and the official Great Seal of France. Marianne is typically depicted wearing a cockade and a red Phrygian cap, symbolising liberty.

== Gallic rooster ==
The choice of the Gallic rooster as a symbol for France dates to the Middle Ages. It finds its origin in a play on the word gallus (Latin for rooster) and Gallus (Gallic). Despite its frequent use as a symbol for France, in particular by sports federations, the rooster has never been an official emblem. Cocorico! (French for 'cock-a-doodle-doo') is often used as an affirmation of French patriotism.

== Great Seal ==
Great Seal of France, in 1848. The headdress of Liberty is similar to the 1886 Statue of Liberty (Liberty Enlightening the World), which are both prominent republican symbols.

The Great Seal of France (French: Grand sceau de la République française) is the official seal of the French Republic. The seal features Liberty personified as a seated Juno wearing a crown with seven arches. She holds a fasces and is supported by a ship's tiller with a rooster printed on it. At her feet is a vase with the letters "SU" (Suffrage Universel', French for 'universal suffrage'). At her right, in the background, are symbols of the arts (painter's tools), architecture (Ionic order), education (burning lamp), agriculture (a sheaf of wheat) and industry (a cog wheel). The scene is surrounded by the legend RÉPUBLIQUE FRANÇAISE, DÉMOCRATIQUE, UNE ET INDIVISIBLE (French Republic, democratic, one and indivisible) and 24 FEV.1848 (24 February 1848) at the bottom.

The reverse bears the words AU NOM DU PEUPLE FRANÇAIS (In the name of the French people) surrounded by a crown of oak (a symbol of perennity) and laurel (a symbol of glory) leaves tied together with weed and grapes (for agriculture and wealth), and the circular national motto LIBERTÉ, ÉGALITÉ, FRATERNITÉ.

== Diplomatic emblem ==
The diplomatic emblem of France is an unofficial emblem of the French Republic. It was adopted in 1913 by the French Foreign Ministry as a symbol for use by French diplomatic missions and consular posts abroad. It was based on an earlier design by the sculptor Jules-Clément Chaplain. The emblem also appears on the cover of French passports.

== Coat of arms ==
France does not have an official coat of arms, but has an unofficial emblem. It depicts a lictor's fasces upon branches of laurel and oak, as well as a ribbon bearing the national motto of Liberté, égalité, fraternité. The full achievement includes the star and grand collar of the Legion of Honour. This composition was created in 1905 (during the Third Republic) by heraldic painter-engraver Maurice de Meyère, and it has been used at the Foreign Ministry during state visits and for presidential inaugurations.

The only national symbol specified in the present constitution is the tricolour flag in Article 2.

== Cockade ==
The cockade of France is the national ornament of France, obtained by circularly pleating a blue, white and red ribbon. It is composed of the three colors of the French flag with blue in the center, white immediately outside and red on the edge.

== Other RF and tricolour-based emblems ==
Shield on the Senate entrance

Sometimes used on a semi-official basis, but has no official status as the arms of the French Republic

== Historical emblems ==
=== 1940–1944 ===
Official
Cartouche of the French State (Vichy France; 1940–1944)

Unofficial
Emblem of Marshal Philippe Pétain, Chief of State of the French State, featuring the motto Travail, Famille, Patrie (Work, Family, Fatherland). The Francisque was only Pétain's personal emblem but was also gradually used as the regime's informal emblem on official documents (Vichy France; 1940–1944).

Unofficial
Alternate version of the Francisque emblem of Marshal Philippe Pétain, Chief of State of the French State

Unofficial
The Cross of Lorraine, emblem of Free France (1940–1944) and later a political emblem of Gaullism

== See also ==
- Symbolism in the French Revolution
