= Coat of arms of France =

Unofficial emblem

Unofficial coat of arms of France

Versions
- Achievement
- Armiger: French Republic
- Adopted: 1905; 121 years ago
- Crest: Wreath
- Shield: Azure, a lictor's fasces palewise upon two branches, of oak and of laurel, crossed in saltire, all or, surmounted by a ribbon of the same charged with the motto in letters sable: "LIBERTÉ, ÉGALITÉ, FRATERNITÉ"
- Order(s): Star and grand collar of the Legion of Honour (current version since 1953)
- Earlier version: See history

France does not have an official coat of arms, but has an unofficial emblem. It depicts a lictor's fasces upon branches of laurel and oak, as well as a ribbon bearing the national motto of Liberté, égalité, fraternité. The full achievement includes the star and grand collar of the Legion of Honour. This composition was created in 1905 (during the Third Republic) by heraldic painter-engraver Maurice de Meyère, and it has been used at the Foreign Ministry during state visits and for presidential inaugurations.

The country is traditionally associated with the fleurs-de-lis design, which came into use by French kings during the High Middle Ages. This design still represents France and the House of Bourbon in the form of marshalling, such as in the arms of Spain, Quebec, and Canada. The fleur-de-lis was also the symbol of Île-de-France, the core of the French kingdom, and the arms of many French communes.

The only national symbol specified in the present constitution is the tricolour flag in Article 2.

== Devices ==
The blazoning is:

Azure, a lictor's fasces palewise upon two branches, of oak and of laurel, crossed in saltire, all or, surmounted by a ribbon of the same charged with the motto in letters sable: "LIBERTÉ, ÉGALITÉ, FRATERNITÉ". The shield is surrounded by the Grand Collar of the Order of the Legion of Honor proper, the cross suspended from it in base.

=== Coat of arms: charges ===
==== Motto ====
Liberté, égalité, fraternité (French pronunciation: [libɛʁte eɡalite fʁatɛʁnite]; "liberty, equality, fraternity", is the national motto of France, and is an example of a tripartite motto. Although it finds its origins in the French Revolution, it was then only one motto among others and was not institutionalized until the Third Republic at the end of the 19th century.

==== Fasces ====
Fasces are a bundle of birch rods containing a sacrificial axe. In Roman times, the fasces symbolized the power of magistrates, representing union and accord with the Roman Republic. French architects began to use the Roman fasces (faisceaux romains) as a decorative device during the reign of Louis XIII (1610–1643), and the imagery of the French Revolution used references to the ancient Roman Republic to an even greater extent. During the First Republic, topped by the Phrygian cap, the fasces is a tribute to the Roman Republic and means that power belongs to the people. It also symbolizes the "unity and indivisibility of the Republic", as stated in the French Constitution.

==== Branches ====
- The oak is France's national tree, and a common symbol of strength and endurance.
- A bay laurel (Laurus nobilis) branch, an aromatic broadleaf evergreen, or later from spineless butcher's broom (Ruscus hypoglossum) or cherry laurel (Prunus laurocerasus). It is a symbol of triumph, which traces back to Greek mythology. Apollo is represented wearing a laurel wreath on his head, and wreaths were awarded to victors in athletic competitions, including the ancient Olympics – for which they were made of wild olive-tree known as "kotinos" (κότινος), (sc. at Olympia)—and in poetic meets. In Rome they were symbols of martial victory, crowning a successful commander during his triumph.

=== External devices ===
- Star and grand collar of the Legion of Honour, which is the highest French order of merit for military and civil merits, established in 1802 by Napoleon Bonaparte and retained by all later French governments and régimes. The achievement includes the order's grand collar, which is worn only by the President, as Grand Master of the order.

== History ==
=== Background ===
==== 13th century – 1870: Arms of dominion / French Revolution ====
French kings and emperors had personal arms of dominion, which by extension also represented France. The fleur-de-lis was used by French kings since the Middle Ages, which were followed by the Napoleonic eagle designs after the French Revolution. The fleur-de-lis is still popular, and used by overseas people of French heritage, like the Acadians, Québécois or Cajuns. The Napoleonic eagle is also used by Swedish royal house.

Period	Dates used	Coat of arms	Achievement	Banner of arms	Description and blazon
Kingdom	Before 1305	France Ancient			The arms of France Ancient: Azure semé-de-lis or The historical coat of arms of France were the golden fleurs-de-lys on a blue field, used continuously for nearly six centuries (1211–1792). Although according to legend they originated at the baptism of Clovis, who supposedly replaced the three toads that adorned his shield with three lilies given by an angel, they are first documented only from the early 13th century. They were first shown as semé, that is to say without any definite number and staggered (known as France ancient), but in 1376 they were reduced to three, (known as France modern). With this decision, King Charles V intended to place the kingdom under the double invocation of the Virgin (the lily is a symbol of Mary), and the Trinity, for the number. The traditional supporters of the French royal arms are two angels, sometimes wearing a heraldic dalmatic.
Kingdom	1305–1328				Arms of France Ancient dimidiated with the arms of Navarre, after king Louis X inherited Navare from his mother Joan I of Navarre in 1305.
Kingdom	1328–1376	France Ancient			The arms of France Ancient: Azure semé-de-lis or. After the death of the last direct Capetian in 1328, the kingdom of France passed to the house of Valois through the Salic law, and Navarre passed to the house of Evreux through female line.
Kingdom	1376–1469	France Modern			The arms of France Modern: Azure, three fleurs-de-lis or, a simplified version of France Ancient
Kingdom	1469–1515	France Modern			The arms of France Modern. After the creation of the Order of Saint Michael in 1469, its collar was added to the royal arms.
Kingdom	1515–1578	France Modern			The arms of France Modern. King Francis I changed the open crown traditionally used by his predecessors for a closed one.
Kingdom	1578–1589	France Modern			The arms of France Modern. After the creation of the Order of the Holy Spirit in 1578, its collar was added to the royal arms.
Kingdom	1589–1792				The royal arms of the Kingdom of France after the conclusion of the French Wars of Religion. Again the arms of the Kingdom of Navarre impaled with France Moderne, indicating the personal union of the two realms as a result of Henry IV becoming king.
First Republic	1791–1804				Putative heraldic emblem of the French First Republic
First Empire	1804–1814/1815				The arms of the First French Empire of Napoleon I, featuring the Aetos Dios, the Crown of Napoleon and inset with "golden bees" as in the tomb of King Childeric I.
Kingdom (Bourbon Restoration)	1814/1815–1830	France Modern			After the Bourbon Restoration, the royal House of Bourbon once more assumed the French crown.
Kingdom (July Monarchy)	1830–1831				During the July Monarchy, the arms of the House of Orléans were used.
Kingdom (July Monarchy)	1831–1848				From 1831 onward, the arms of Louis-Philippe were used, depicting the Charter of 1830. (Stars were eventually added to the Mantling; along with addition of Supporters, a decrease of the flags to two, the addition of a helmet, the reversion to the Fleur-de-Lys Crown as one of the two Crowns, the flagpoles having spearheads and at the base were two cannons surmounted by floral branches.)
Second Empire	1852–1870				The arms of the Second French Empire of Napoleon III, again featuring the Jovial Eagle, but now with the Crown of Napoleon III.

Examples of emblazonment

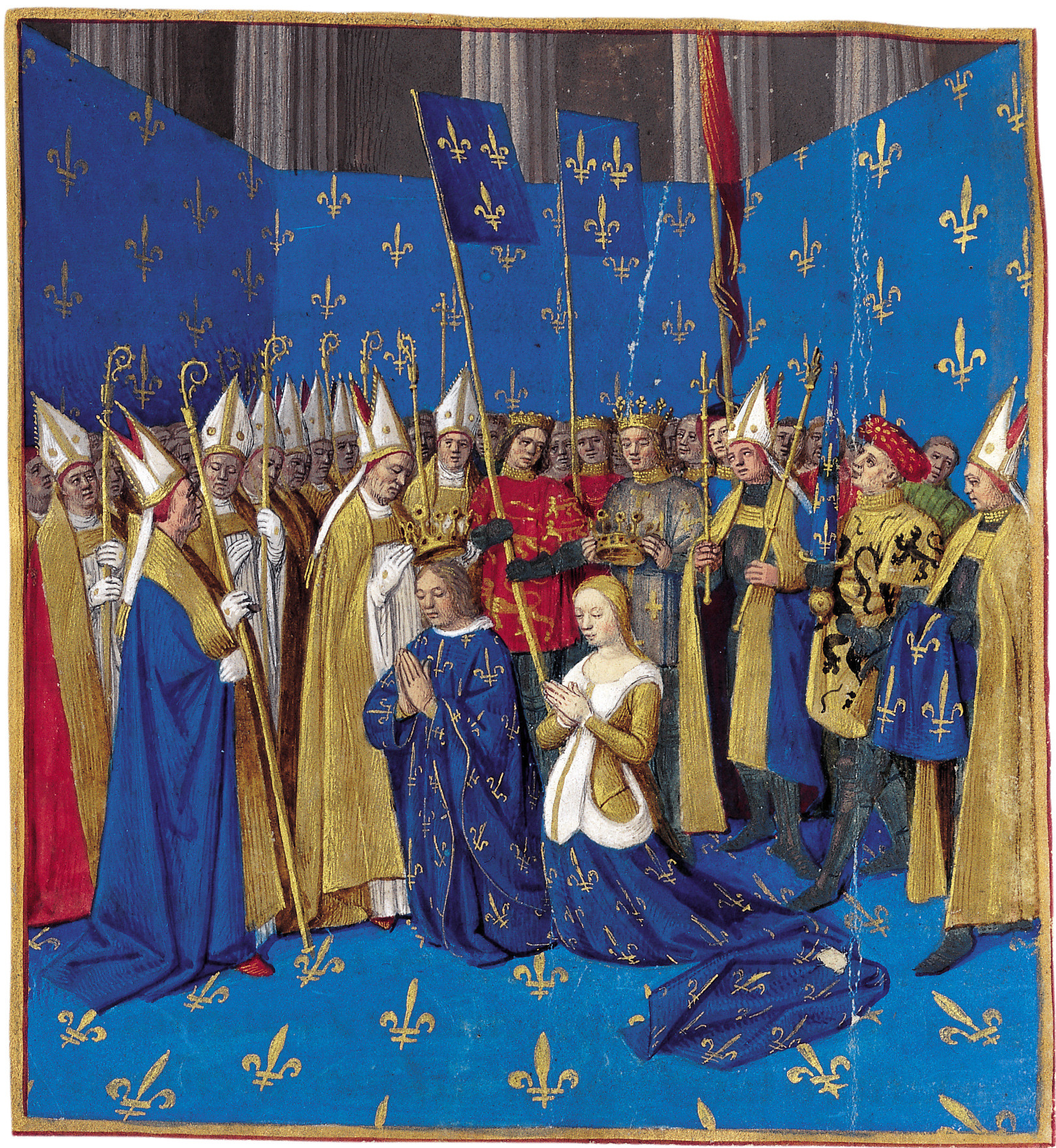
Baldachin, banners and mantles (1223)

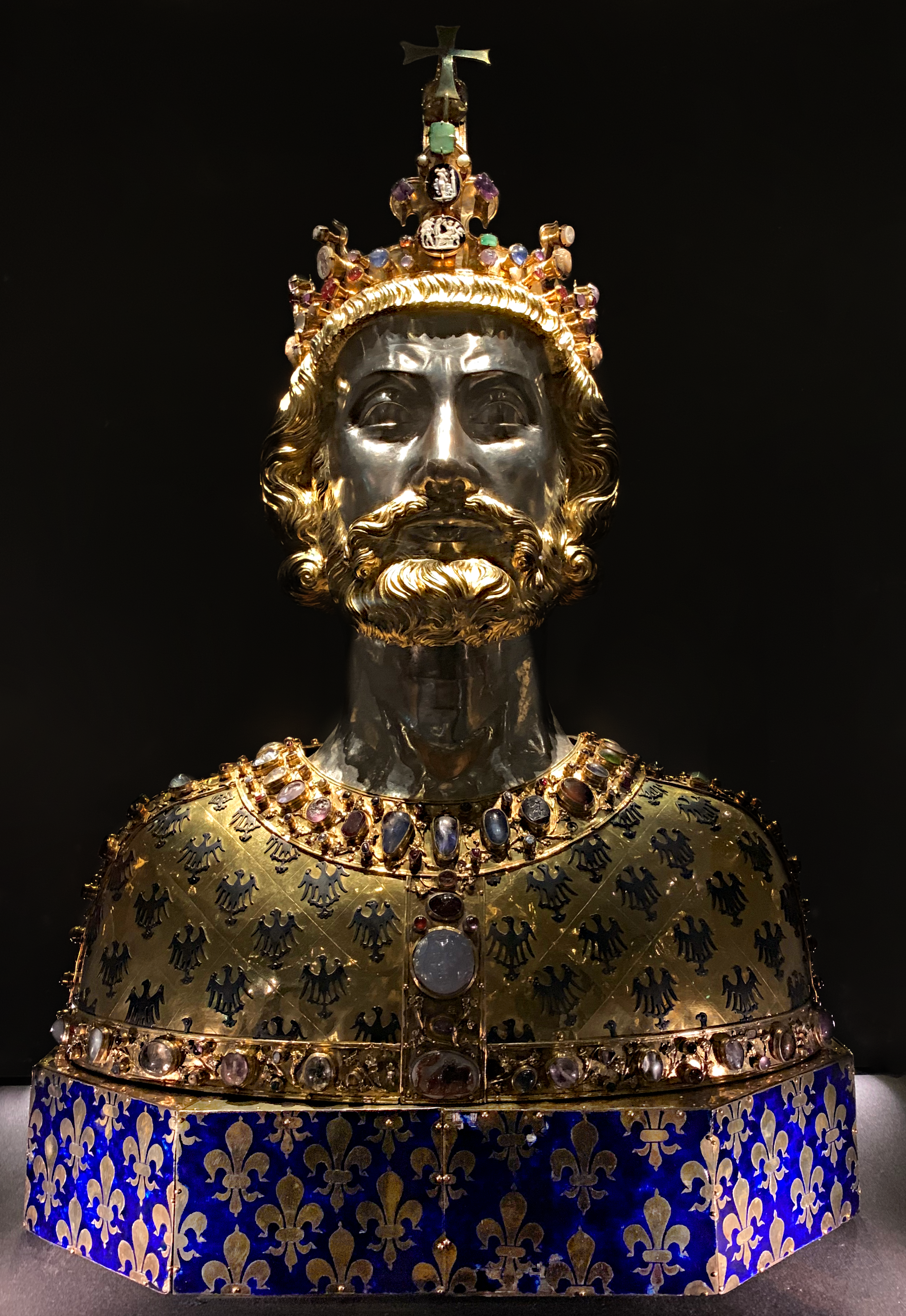
Bust of Charlemagne (1349)

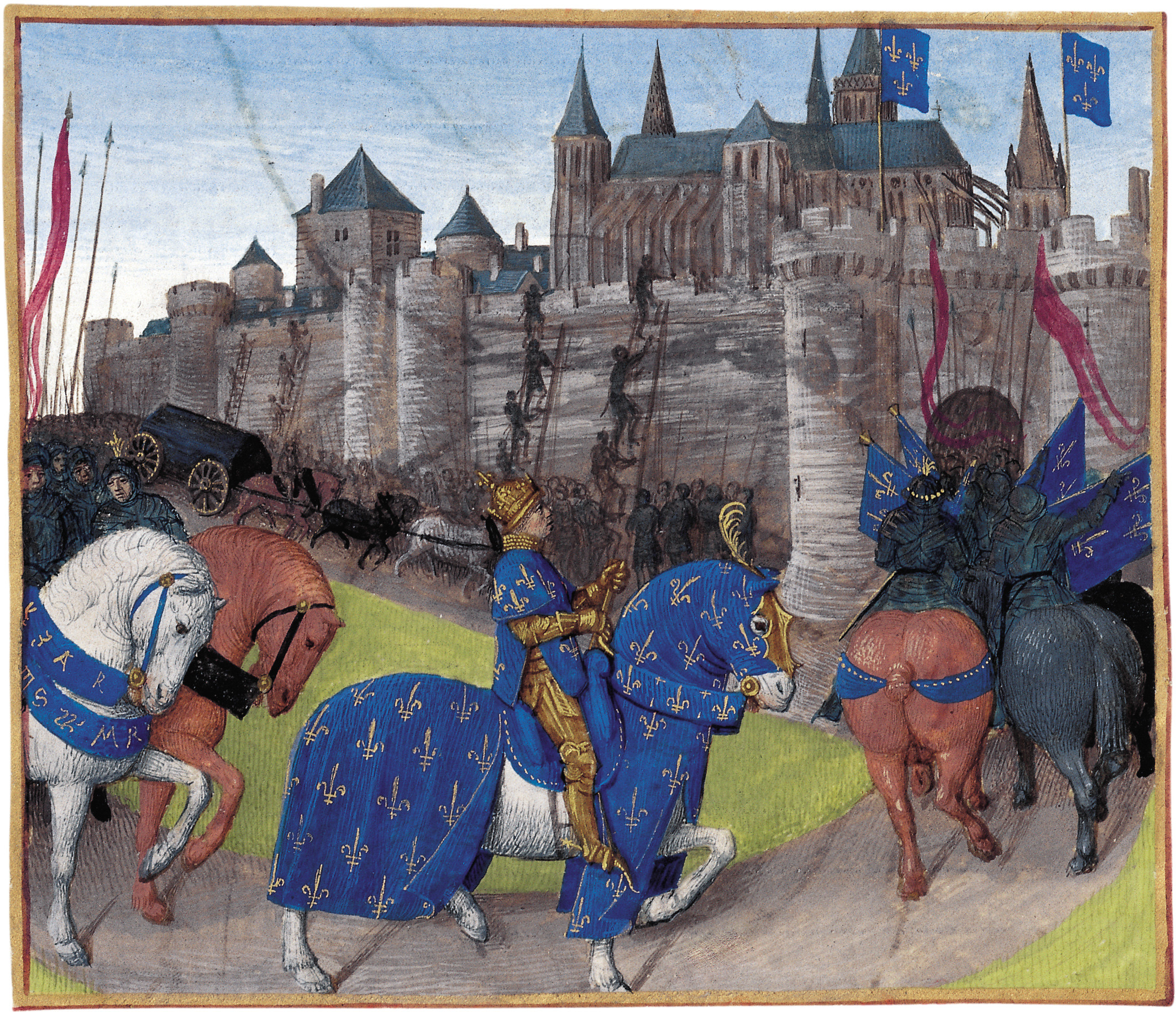
Caparison and banners (c. 1455)

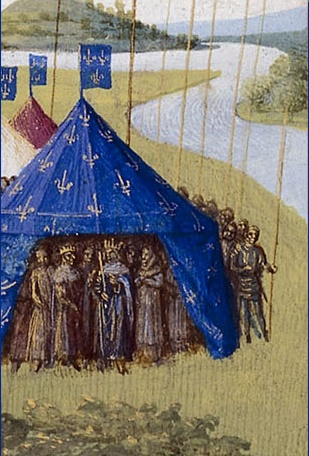
Tent (15th century)

Cushion, mantle, upholstery and Joyeuse's scabbard (1701)

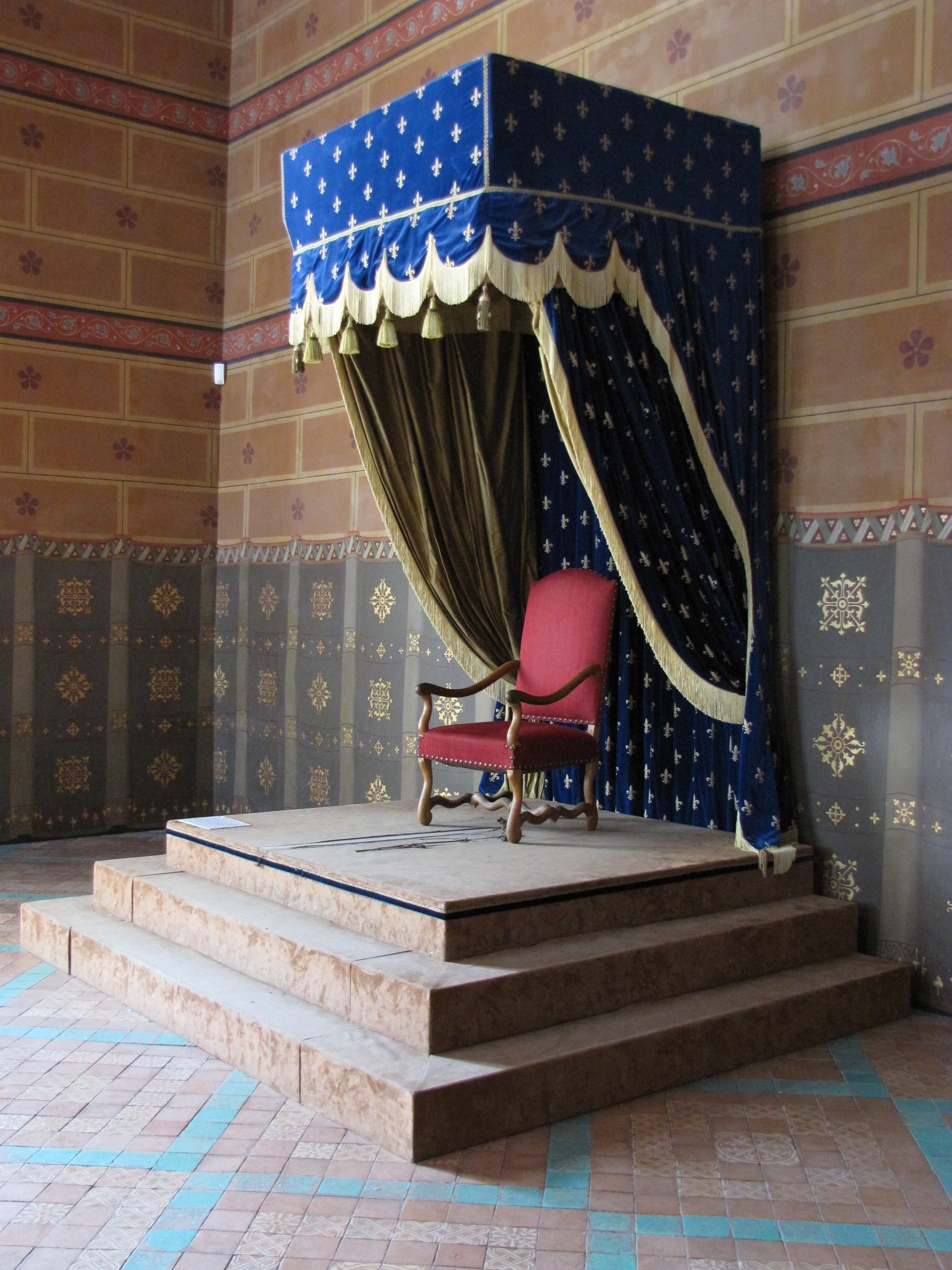
Baldachin (2010)

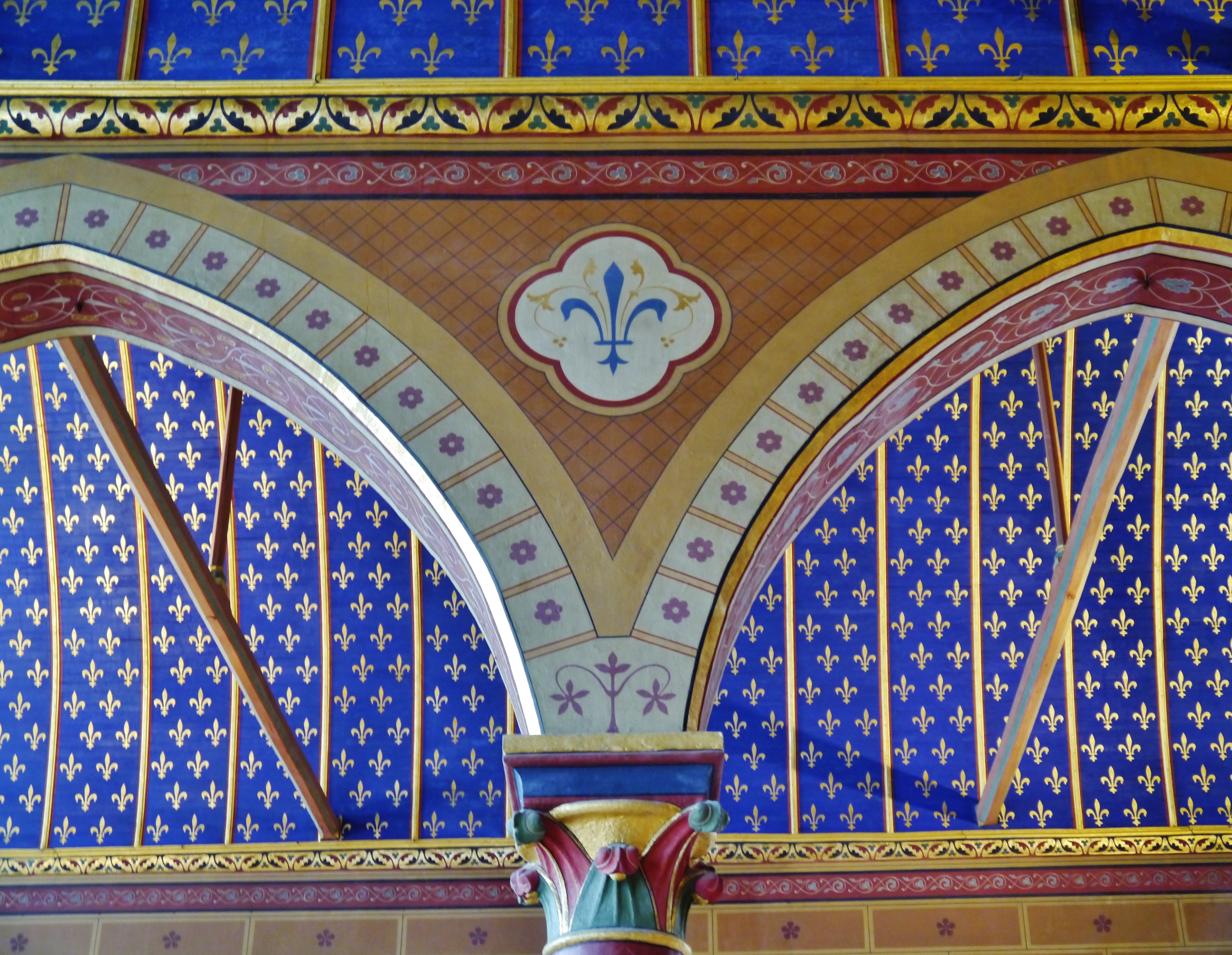
Ceiling (2018)

Marshal's baton (royal)

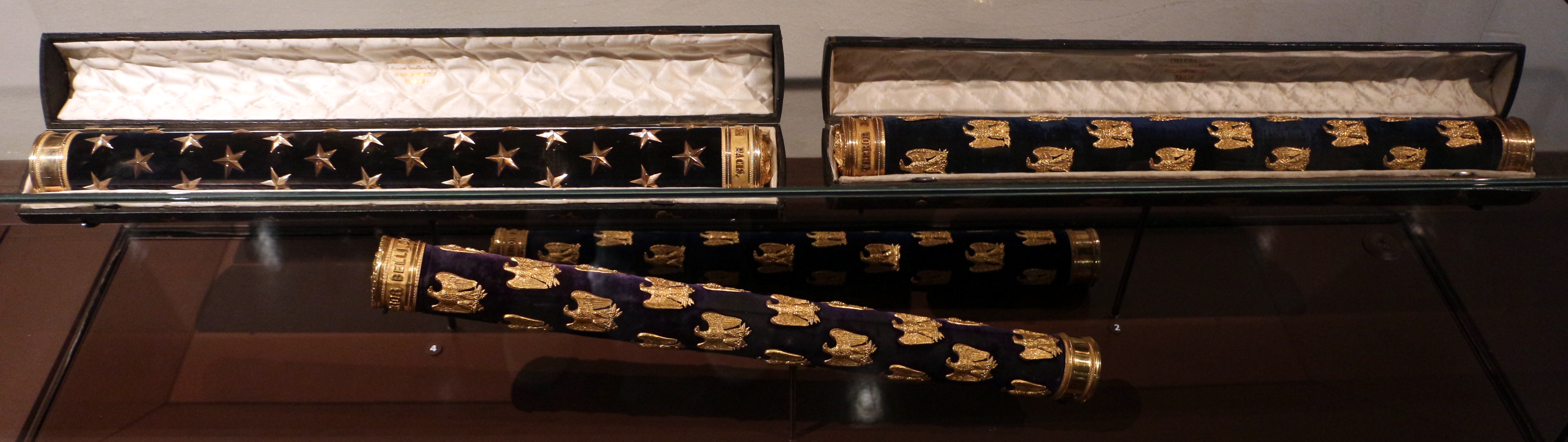
Marshal's baton (imperial)

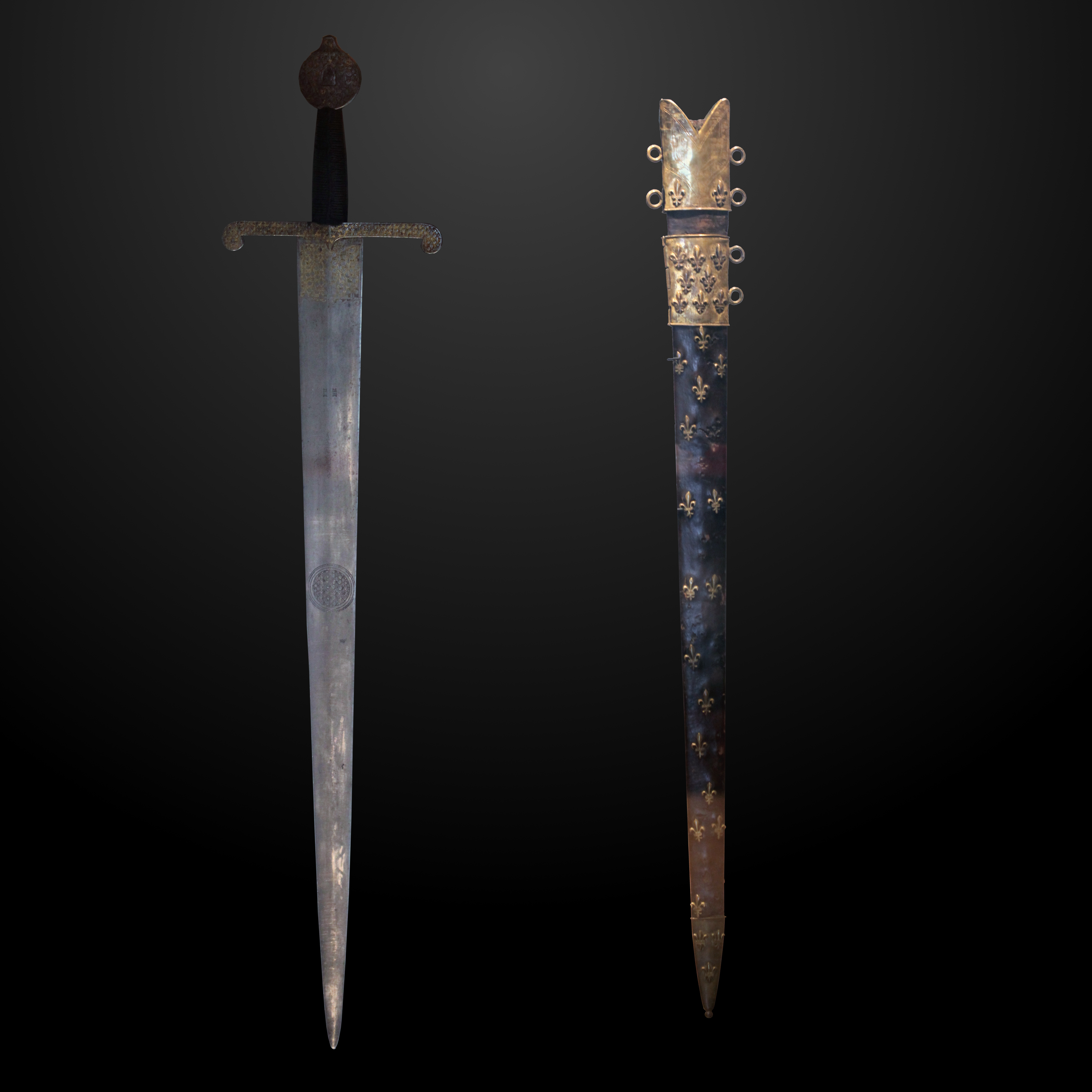
Grand Constable of France's scabbard
Examples of modern marshalling

Coat of arms of Spain

Coat of arms of Canada

Coat of arms of Quebec

Coat of arms of Sweden

==== 1870–1905: Period without any national coat of arms ====
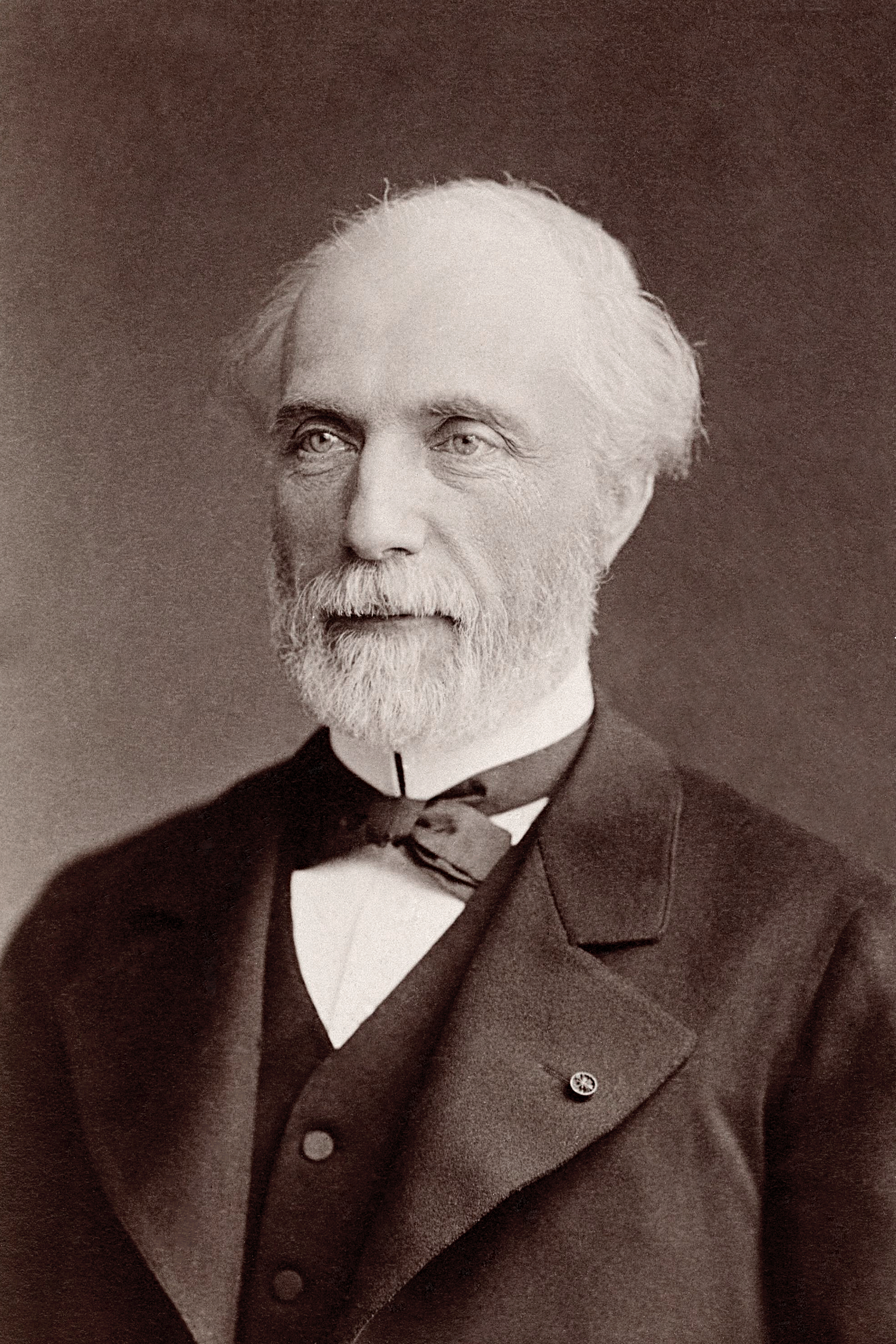
In 1881, Foreign Minister de Freycinet proposed a coat of arms that was not successfully implemented.

The state was left without a coat of arms after the proclamation of the Third Republic in 1870. Consequently, the façade and balconies of French embassies and consulates were sometimes decorated with quasi-heraldic emblems, such as a simple RF monogram or a lictor's fasces topped with a Phrygian cap. This was lamented by diplomats, as it neither reflected the country's rich heraldic tradition nor matched other European countries' emblems.

In 1881 Foreign Minister Charles de Freycinet sought to address this issue by proposing arms. This first attempt was not successful. Count Horace de Choiseul, undersecretary of state in this department, invited the sculptor Francia to submit a proposal to him, which this denier executed on the drawing of Émile Bin.

=== 1905–present: Adoption and modifications in external devices ===
King Alfonso XIII of Spain's official visit to France in 1905, as well as preceding visits from king Edward VII and Victor Emmanuel III of the United Kingdom and Italy, respectively, once again brought attention to the fact that France had no coat of arms. The Foreign Ministry responded by consulting the Grand Chancellery, which in turn asked the heraldists to propose national heraldic devices. Among about twenty proposals which were approved by the government, heraldic painter-engraver Maurice de Meyère's composition was formally adopted as the new coat of arms of France. This design was to be used by embassies and consulates abroad, instead of previous quasi-heraldic emblems.

de Meyère's 1905 design

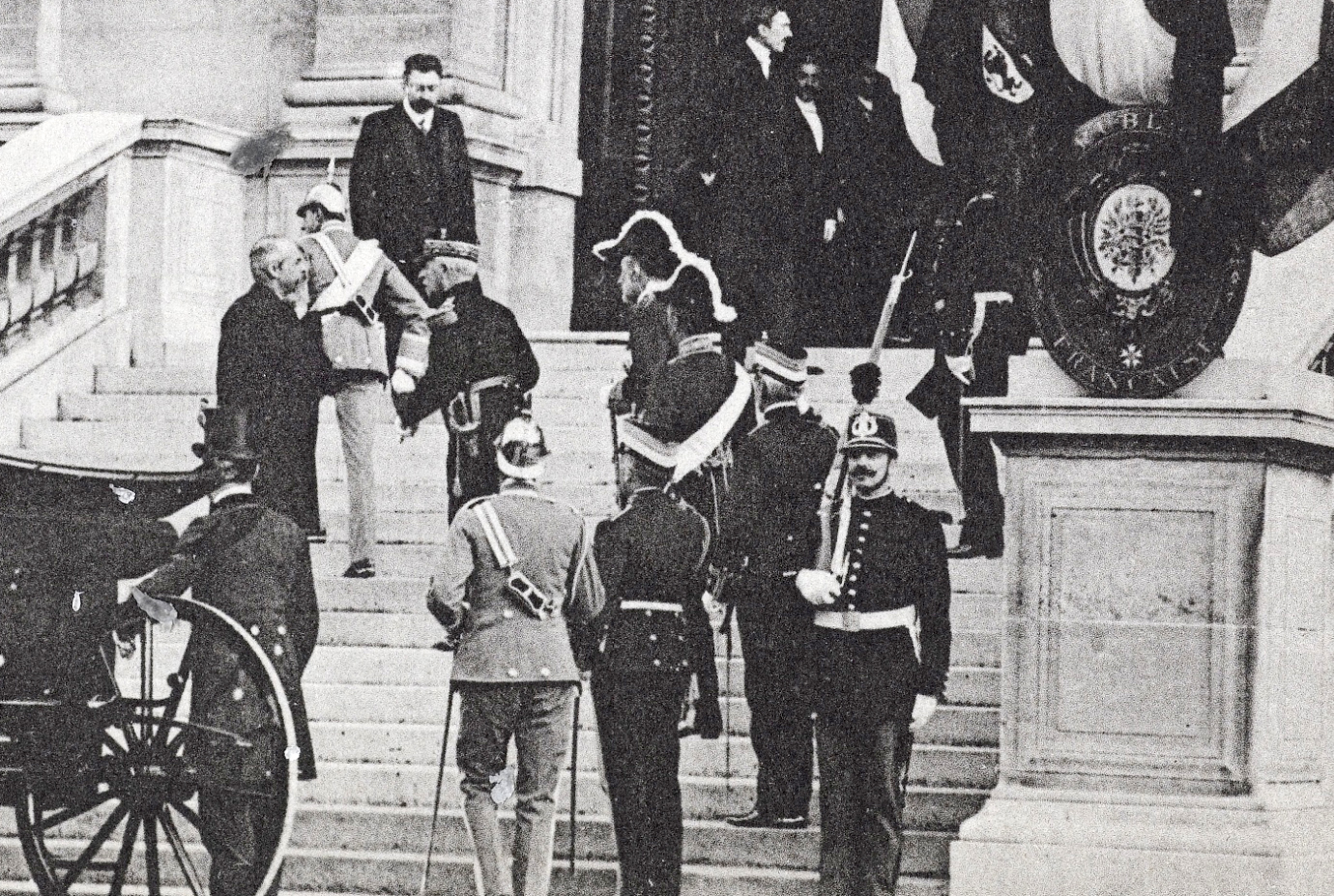
The arms adorning the Foreign Ministry in 1905

In de Meyère's composition, the escutcheon was framed by an artistic console, whereas the Legion of Honour's star featured as the sole external heraldic device. The entire achievement was depicted upon an oval background with the words "French Republic" on the edge, a non-heraldic element. The console and oval background were mentioned as late as February 1914, but generally omitted after World War I, while the star of the Legion of Honour had been accompanied by the 1881 version of the grand collar.

In 1924/1925, a greater version of the arms was invented for a decorative tapestry commissioned by the city of Strasbourg to Gustave Louis Jaulmes. It was never formally adopted.

Achievements including the 1881 version of the grand collar

Actually used version

In 1953, the collar was redesigned.

== Usage ==
A list of notable depictions:

- 1905: A watercolour reproducing de Meyère's design was sent to each member of the government, and the arms adorned the two entrances of the French foreign ministry (37 Quai d'Orsay) at the occasion of King Alfonso's visit.
- 1922: The arms was emblazoned on the bronze Medal for Fidelity to France (French: Médaille de la Fidélité Française), awarded to inhabitants of the two border regions of Alsace and Lorraine, who had been either imprisoned or exiled by the occupying Germans during World War I because of their loyalty to France.
- 1924/1925: A greater version of the arms was depicted on a painted tapestry by Gustave Louis Jaulmes, titled "Les armes de France". Commissioned by the city of Strasbourg, this piece was to be installed at the Commissariat General of the Republic in the city.
- 1928: German encyclopedias gave a color reproduction of Jaulmes' greater arms.
- 1929: On 10 May the German embassy in France inquired what was the official coat of arms of France was. The French Ministry of Foreign Affairs replied that "there is no, in principle, official coat of arms or emblem," but that such a composition was used for the French embassies and consulates.
- 1933–1942: The arms were depicted on prefects' uniforms.
- 1935: The annual edition of Le Petit Larousse reproduced a monochrome reproduction of the arms as a symbol of the French Republic.
- 1953: The United Nations Secretariat requested that France submit a national coat of arms that were to adorn the wall behind the podium in the General Assembly hall in New York, alongside the other member states' arms. On 3 June, an interministerial commission met at the Ministry of Foreign Affairs to select this emblem. It requested Robert Louis (1902–1965), heraldic artist, to produce a version of the Jules-Clément Chaplain design. In the end, Louis chose Maurice de Meyère's 1905 design instead, and this was adopted and submitted to the UN.
- 1975: President Valéry Giscard d'Estaing adopted the charge of the arms in his presidential standard.
- 6 June 1980: President d'Estaing assumed on him being admitted to the Order of the Seraphim: Azure a Fasces Or bindings Argent between two Laurel sprigs disposed orleways of the second and bound together in base by a ribbon of the third., based on the republican arms.
- 1982/1988: The arms were depicted on French space suits during the Franco-Soviet space missions of 1982 and 1988.
- 2009: Used to represent France in the Hanseatic Fountain in Veliky Novgorod, Russia.

The coat of arms is still used, e.g. in relation to presidential inaugurations, including that of François Mitterrand, Jacques Chirac and Emmanuel Macron in 1981, 1995 and 2017, respectively.

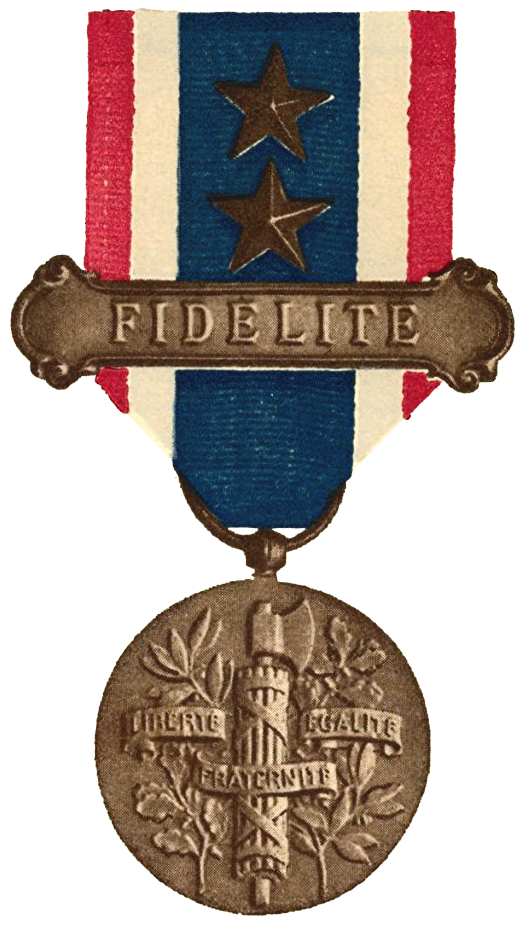
The arms emblazoned onto the reverse side of the Medal for Fidelity to France, instituted in 1922

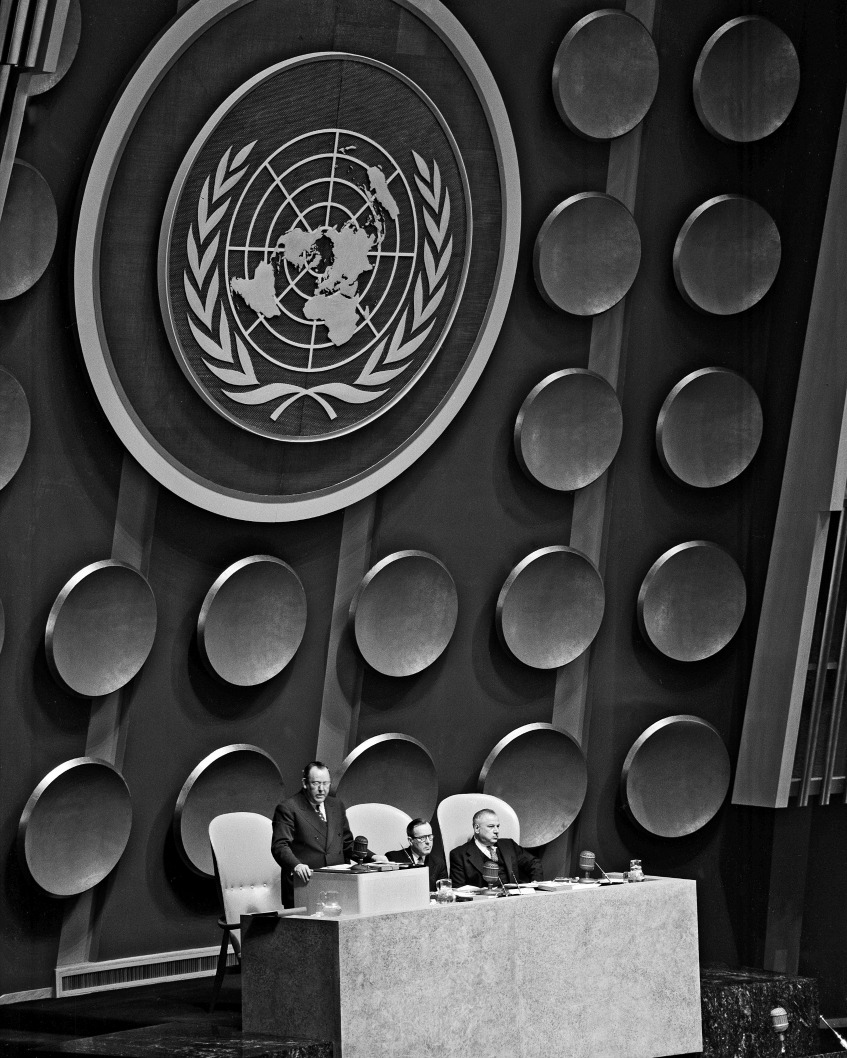
Escutcheons in the UNGA hall intended to be emblazoned with national arms, including France's, but removed in 1956

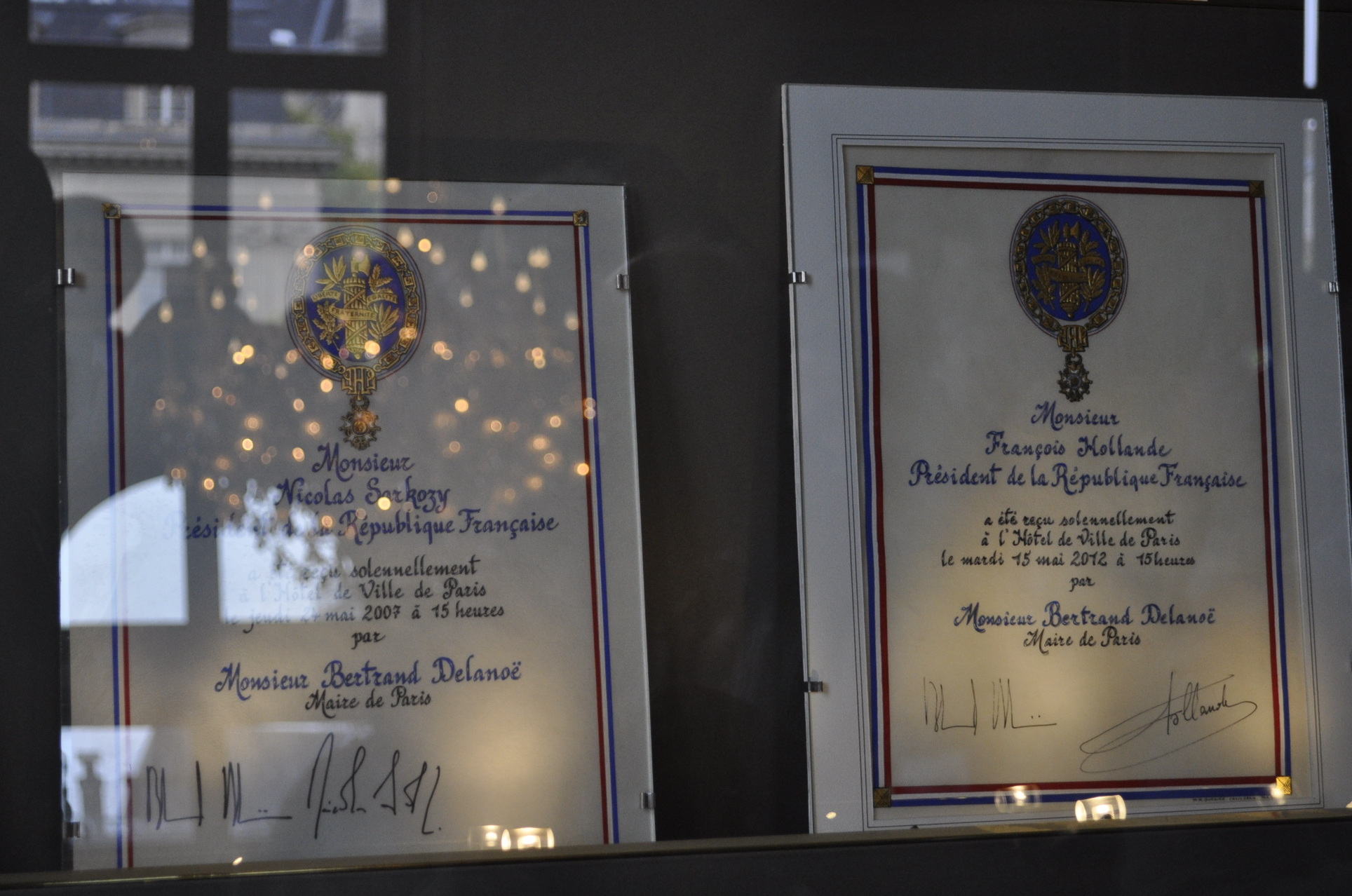
The arms depicted on presidential inaugural documents

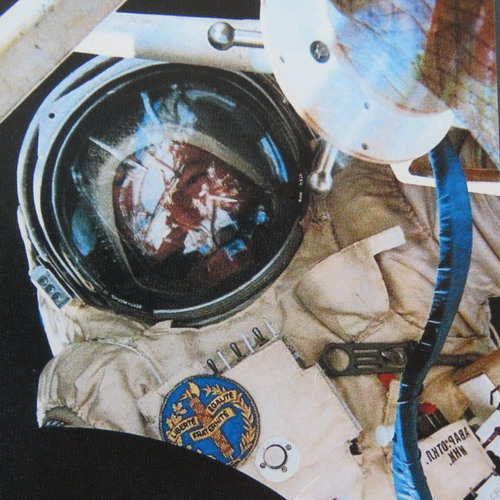
The arms depicted on Jean-Loup Chrétien's suit at the 1988 Aragatz mission to the Mir space station

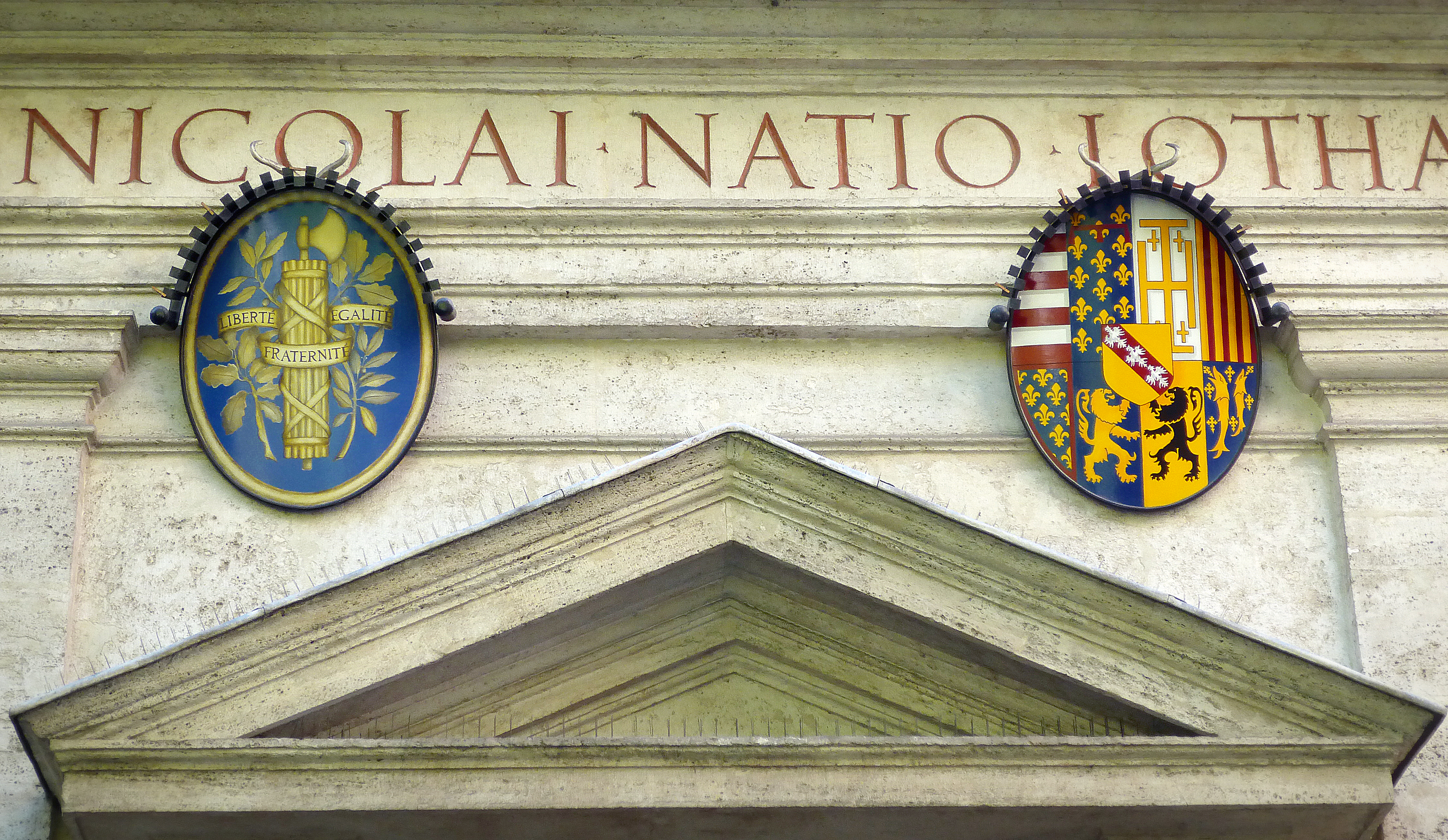
The arms (l.) adorning Rome's Church of Saint Nicholas of the Lorrainers, dedicated to France

== See also ==
- Armorial of France
- Armorial of the Capetian dynasty
- National symbols of France
- Symbolism in the French Revolution
