= Diplomatic emblem of France =

Diplomatic emblem

The diplomatic emblem of France is an unofficial emblem of the French Republic. It was adopted in 1913 by the French Foreign Ministry as a symbol for use by French diplomatic missions and consular posts abroad. It was based on an earlier design by the sculptor Jules-Clément Chaplain. The emblem also appears on the cover of French passports.

== Description ==
The emblem consists of:

- A wide pelte shield with, on the one end, a lion-head and, on the other end, an eagle-head. The shield bears the monogram 'RF', which stands for République Française (French Republic).
- An olive branch, which symbolises peace.
- An oak branch, which symbolises perennity or wisdom.
- The fasces symbol, which is associated with the exercise of justice (the bundle of rods and an axe were carried by lictors in Ancient Rome) and the republic. This use of the fasces predates the adoption of this symbol by Benito Mussolini as the emblem of Italian Fascism.

== Usage ==
The emblem appears on plaques and signs at French diplomatic missions, as well as on the cover of French passports and some other documents. In addition, a variation of the emblem is used as a symbol of the presidency of the French Republic.

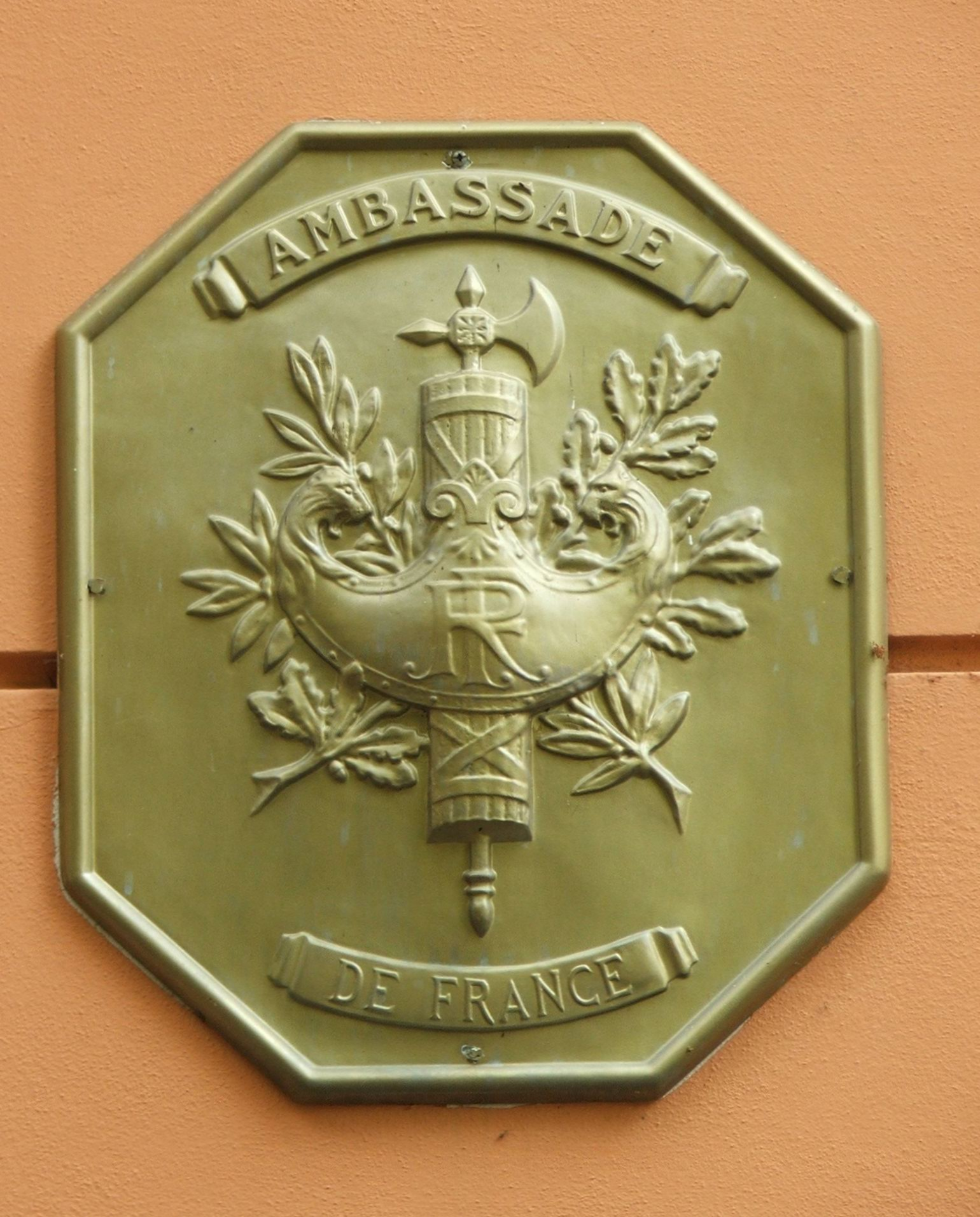
Plaque at the French embassy in Prague

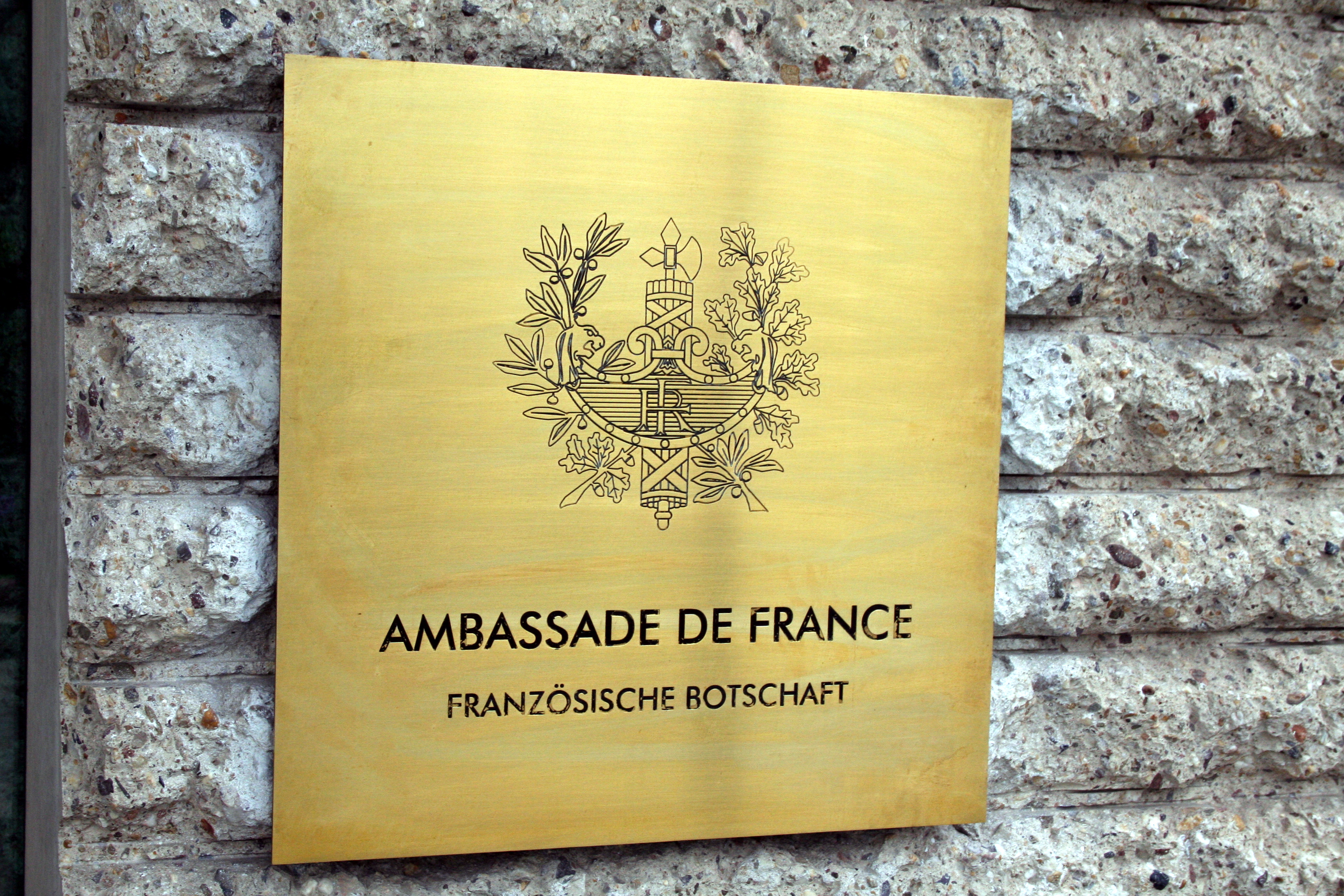
Sign at the French embassy in Berlin

French passport cover

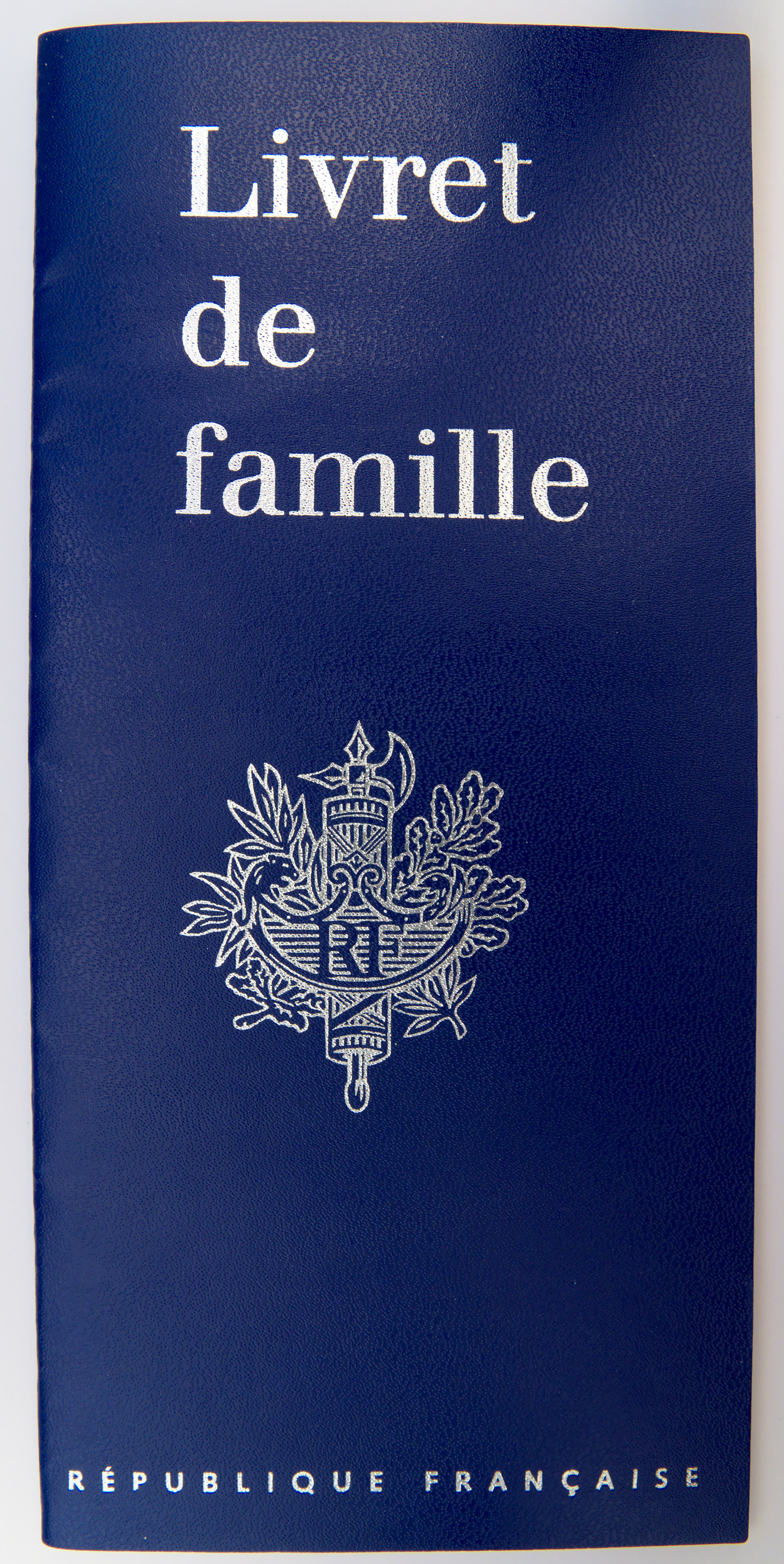
French family register

== See also ==
- Armorial of France
- National emblem of France
- National symbols of France
