= Armorial of the Communes of Oise =

Arms of Oise

Armorial of the Communes of Oise due to its length, it is split into 4 sub pages :

- Armorial of the Communes of Oise (A–C)
- Armorial of the Communes of Oise (D–H)
- Armorial of the Communes of Oise (I–P)
- Armorial of the Communes of Oise (Q–Z)

Together, these pages lists the armoury (emblazons=graphics and blazons=heraldic descriptions; or coats of arms) of the communes in Oise (department 60)

== Sources ==
- Heraldry of the World: Oise
