= Armorial of the Communes of Nord =

Armorial of the Communes of Nord due to its length, it is split into 4 sub pages :

- Armorial of the Communes of Nord (A–C)
- Armorial of the Communes of Nord (D–H)
- Armorial of the Communes of Nord (I–P)
- Armorial of the Communes of Nord (Q–Z)

Together, these pages lists the armoury (emblazons=graphics and blazons=heraldic descriptions; or coats of arms) of the communes in Nord (department 59)
