= Jules-Clément Chaplain =

French sculptor

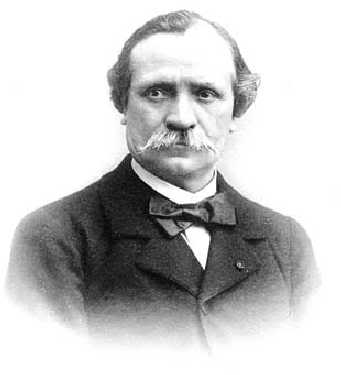
- Jules-Clément Chaplain
- Born: 12 July 1839 (age 187); Mortagne-au-Perche
- Died: 13 July 1909; Paris
- Body discovered: Montparnasse Cemetery
- Education: École des Beaux-Arts
- Occupations: Sculptor, Medallist
- Awards: Prix de Rome, Légion d'honneur

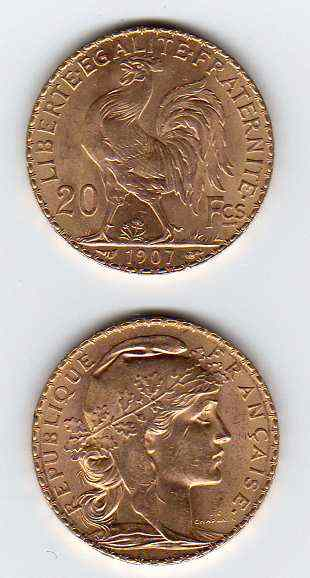
20 francs-or Chaplain

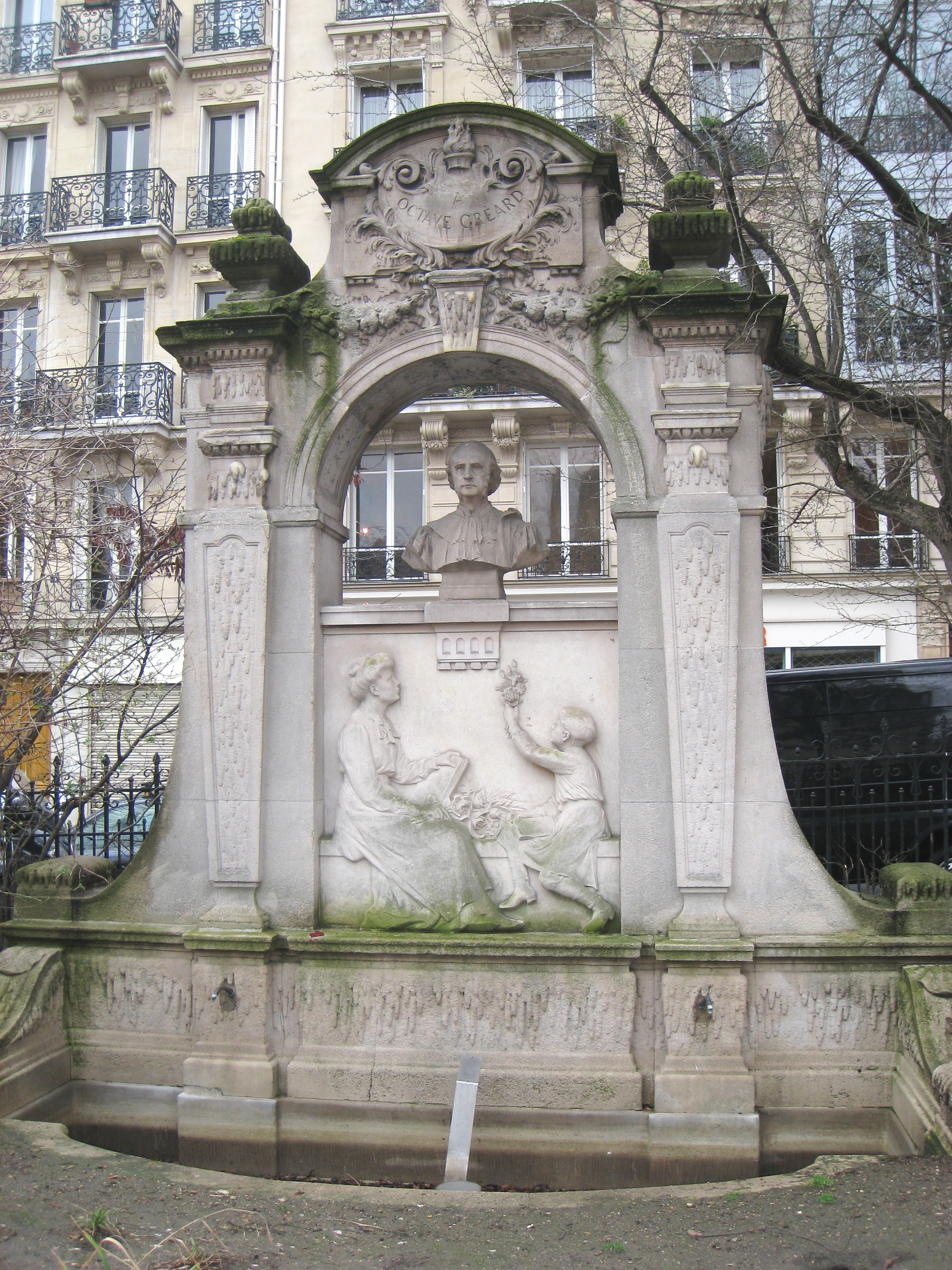
Monument to Octave Gréard by Henri Paul Nénot and Jules-Clément Chaplain

Jules-Clément Chaplain (12 July 1839 – 13 July 1909) was a French sculptor and one of its finest medallists. With Louis Oscar Roty (1846–1911) he helped found the Art Nouveau movement.

Chaplain was born in Mortagne-au-Perche, Orne, and in 1857 entered the École des Beaux-Arts where he studied sculpture under François Jouffroy and medals under Eugène Oudiné. In 1863, he won the Prix de Rome for medal-engraving and worked in Rome 1864–1868. He exhibited regularly at the Salon from 1863, receiving numerous awards, and in 1869 returned to Paris where he found official success almost immediately. In 1877 he was named official medallist of the French government, in 1878 a chevalier of the Légion d'honneur, and in 1881 appointed to the Académie des Beaux-Arts. In 1896 he became Art Director of the Manufacture nationale de Sèvres in 1900 a Commander of the Légion d'honneur.

Chaplain was responsible for the official portraits of every president of the French Republic from Patrice de Mac-Mahon, duc de Magenta, in 1877 to Émile Loubet in 1899. He also received the commission for engraving the gold coinage of France, and his official gold medal commemorating the 1896 visit of Czar Nicholas II of Russia was called "a masterpiece and one of the finest ever struck."

Chaplain died in Paris 1909. His grave is in the Montparnasse Cemetery.
