= Royal Mottos =

Royal Mottos may refer to:

- Royal mottos of Danish monarchs
- Royal mottos of Norwegian monarchs
- Royal mottos of Swedish monarchs
