= List of national mottos =

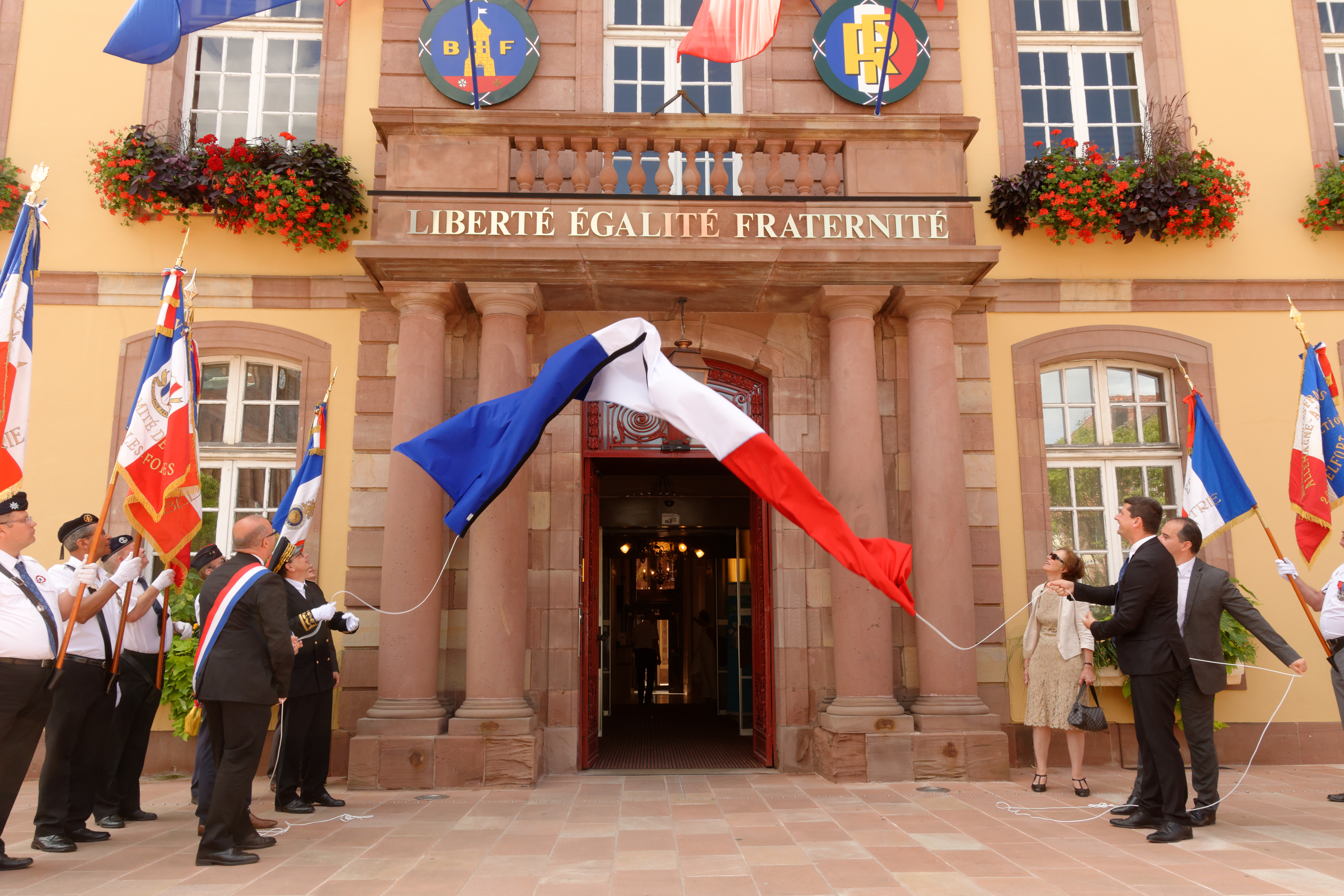
France's national motto Liberté, égalité, fraternité, seen on a public building in Belfort

This article lists state and national mottos for the world's nations. The mottos for some states lacking general international recognition, extinct states, non-sovereign nations, regions, and territories are listed, but their names are not bolded.

A state motto is used to describe the intent or motivation of the state in a short phrase. For example, it can be included on a country's flag, coat of arms, or currency. Some countries do not have a national motto.

== Current sovereign countries ==
- Afghanistan: There is no other god other than Allah (God); Muhammad is the messenger of God. (Arabic: لا إله إلا الله، محمد رسول الله; Lā ʾilāha ʾillāl–lāh, Muhammadun rasūl allāh)
- Albania: You, Albania, give me honour, give me the name Albanian (Albanian: Ti Shqipëri, më jep nder, më jep emrin Shqipëtar)
- Algeria: By the people and for the people (Arabic: بالشعب و للشعب; Bil-shaʿb wa lil-shaʿb).
- Andorra: United virtue is stronger (Latin: Virtus Unita Fortior).
- Antigua and Barbuda: Each endeavouring, all achieving
- Argentina: No official motto. Unofficial motto: In Union and Liberty (Spanish: En unión y libertad).
- Armenia: One Nation, One Culture (Armenian: Մեկ Ազգ, Մեկ Մշակույթ; Mek Azg, Mek Mshakouyt).
- Australia: No official motto. Formerly Advance Australia.
- Austria: No official motto. A.E.I.O.U. is often seen as a historical national motto. The meaning is debated, but the most well known meaning is Austriae est imperare orbi universo (Austria's destiny is to rule the world).
- Azerbaijan: No official motto. Unofficial: The Land of Fire (Azerbaijani: Odlar Yurdu)

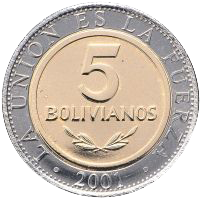
The national motto of Bolivia, La Unión es la Fuerza (Unity is Strength), is inscribed on boliviano coins.

The national motto of Brazil, Ordem e progresso (Order and progress), is inscribed on the Brazilian flag.

- Bahamas: Forward, Upward, Onward Together
- Bangladesh: No official motto. Former recognized official national slogan and war cry (2022–2024): Glory to Bengal (Bengali: Joy Bangla; জয় বাংলা).
- Barbados: Pride and Industry
- Belarus: No official motto. Unofficial motto: Long Live Belarus! (Belarusian: Жыве Беларусь!, Žyvie Biełaruś!)
- Belgium: Unity makes strength (Dutch: Eendracht maakt macht, French: L'union fait la force, German: Einigkeit macht stark).
- Belize: Under the shade I flourish (Latin: Sub umbra floreo).
- Benin: Fellowship, Justice, Labour (French: Fraternité, Justice, Travail).
- Bolivia: Unity makes strength (Spanish: La Unión es la Fuerza).
- Botswana: Rain (Tswana: Pula).
- Brazil: Order and progress (Portuguese: Ordem e progresso)
- Brunei: Always in service with God's guidance (Arabic: الدائمون المحسنون بالهدى Ad-dāʾimūna al-muḥsinūna bi-l-hudā).
- Bulgaria: Unity makes strength (Bulgarian: Съединението прави силата, Sŭedinenieto pravi silata).
- Burkina Faso: Fatherland or death, we shall triumph! (French: La Patrie ou la Mort, nous vaincrons).
- Burundi: Unity, Work, Progress (French: Unité, Travail, Progrès)
- Cambodia: Nation, Religion, King (Khmer: ជាតិ សាសនា ព្រះមហាក្សត្រ; Chéatĕ, Sasânéa, Preăh Môhaksâtr)
- Cameroon: Peace, Work, Fatherland (French: Paix – Travail – Patrie)

The Canadian motto within the 1921 Arms of Canada

- Canada: From sea to sea (Latin: A mari usque ad mare)
- Cape Verde: Unity, Work, Progress (Unidade, Trabalho, Progresso).
- Central African Republic: Unity, Dignity, Work (French: Unité, Dignité, Travail).
- Chad: Unity, Work, Progress (French: Unité, Travail, Progrès)
- Chile: Through reason or by force (Spanish: Por la razón o la fuerza)
- China: No official motto. Unofficial: Serve the people (Chinese: 为人民服务) is the motto of the CCP and the Chinese government.
- Colombia: Freedom and order (Spanish: Libertad y orden).
- Comoros: Unity, Solidarity, Development (French: Unité, Solidarité, Développement).
- Democratic Republic of the Congo: Justice, Peace, Work (French: Justice – Paix – Travail).
- Republic of the Congo: Unity, Work, Progress (French: Unité, Travail, Progrès).
- Cuba: Fatherland or death, we shall overcome! (Spanish: ¡Patria o Muerte, Venceremos!)
- Czech Republic: Truth prevails (Czech: Pravda vítězí)
- Denmark: The national motto of Denmark is the royal motto of the reigning monarch and changes with every monarch. The current Royal Motto of Frederik X: United, committed, for the Kingdom of Denmark (Danish: Forbundet, forpligtet, for Kongeriget Danmark).
- Djibouti: Unity, Equality, Peace (Somali: Itixaad, Gudboonaan, Ammaan, French: Unité, Égalité, Paix).
- Dominica: After God, the Earth (Dominican Creole French: Après Bondié, C'est la Ter).
- Dominican Republic: God, Fatherland, Liberty (Spanish: Dios, Patria, Libertad)
- East Timor: Unity, Action, and Progress (Unidade, Acção, Progresso)
- Ecuador: God, homeland, and freedom (Spanish: Dios, patria y libertad).
- El Salvador: God, Union, Liberty (Spanish: Dios, Unión, Libertad)
- Equatorial Guinea: Unity, Peace, Justice (Spanish: Unidad, Paz, Justicia)
- Eritrea: Victory to the Masses! (Arabic: انتصار للجماهير, Tigrinya: ዓወት ንሓፋሽ!, also in English).
- Estonia: No official motto. Unofficial motto: Long live Estonia! (Estonian: Elagu Eesti!) or Long live the Republic of Estonia! (Elagu Eesti Vabariik!)
- Eswatini: We are the fortress (Swazi: Siyinqaba)
- Ethiopia: Currently no official motto. Formerly: Ethiopia First (Amharic: ኢትዮጲያ ትቅደም; "Ethiopia Tikdem"), and prior to that: Ethiopia holds up her hands unto God (Ge'ez: ኢትዮጵያ ታበድ አደዊሃ ሃበ አግዚአብሐር; Itiyopia tabetsih edewiha habe Igziabiher), taken from Psalm 68:31.
- European Union: United in diversity (Latin: In varietate concordia)
- Fiji: Fear God and honour the King (Fijian: Rerevaka na Kalou ka Doka na Tui)
- Finland: No official motto. When a kingdom was planned as a form of government in 1917, the motto was "Sturdy, Stable, Free" (Finnish: Vankka, vakaa, vapaa)
- France: Liberty, equality, fraternity (French: Liberté, égalité, fraternité)
- Gabon: Union, Work, Justice (French: Union, Travail, Justice)
- Gambia: Progress, Peace, Prosperity.
- Georgia: Strength is in Unity! (Georgian: ძალა ერთობაშია!; Dzala ertobashia).
- Germany: No official motto, de facto: Unity and justice and freedom (German: Einigkeit und Recht und Freiheit), historically: Gott mit uns, Blut und Boden.
- Ghana: Freedom and Justice.
- Greece: Freedom or Death (Greek: Ελευθερία ή θάνατος; Eleftheria i thanatos).
- Grenada: Ever Conscious of God We Aspire, Build and Advance as One People.
- Guatemala: Grow Free and Fertile (Spanish: Libre Crezca Fecundo).
- Guinea: Work, Justice, Solidarity (French: Travail, Justice, Solidarité).
- Guinea-Bissau: Unity, Struggle, Progress (Unidade, Luta, Progresso).
- Guyana: One People, One Nation, One Destiny.
- Haiti: Liberty, equality, fraternity (French: Liberté, égalité, fraternité)
- Honduras: Free, sovereign and independent (Spanish: Libre, Soberana E Independiente)
- Hungary: Currently no official motto. Formerly With God for Homeland and Freedom (Latin: Cum Deo pro Patria et Libertate), battle cry of Prince Francis II Rákóczi in the early 18th century. While there is no official motto, several of them are used in parallel such as Strength, Loyalty, Hope (Hungarian: Erő, Hűség, Remény) or Let there be Peace, Freedom and Concord known from the 12 points before the Habsburg rule the official motto was Kingdom of Mary Patroness of Hungary (Latin: Regnum Mariae Patronae Hungariae)
- Iceland: No official motto. Unofficial motto: It will all work out in the end (Icelandic: Þetta reddast).

The National Emblem of India bears the motto Satyameva Jayate (Sanskrit: "Truth alone triumphs").

The flag of Iraq displays the national motto, Allahu Akbar ("God is Great").

- India: Truth alone triumphs (Sanskrit: सत्यमेव जयते, Satyameva Jayate).
- Indonesia: Unity in diversity (Old Javanese: Bhinneka Tunggal Ika).
- Iran: God is the Greatest (Arabic: الله اكبر; Allahu Akbar). De facto motto: Independence, freedom, the Islamic Republic (Persian: استقلال، آزادى، جمهورى اسلامى; Esteqlāl, āzādī, jomhūrī-ye eslāmī).
- Iraq: God is the Greatest (Arabic: الله أكبر, Allahu Akbar).
- Ivory Coast: Unity, Discipline, Labor (French: Union, Discipline, Travail).
- Jamaica: Out of many, One People
- Japan: No official motto. Charter Oath or The Oath in Five Articles (Japanese: 五箇条の御誓文; Gokajō no Goseimon) was previously used between 1868 and 1912
- Jordan: God, Homeland, King (Jordanian Arabic: الله، الوطن، الملك; Allāh, Al-Waṭan, Al-Malīk).

Kiribati: "Health, Peace and Prosperity" on the Coat of arms of Kiribati.

- Kenya: All pull together (Swahili: Harambee).
- Kiribati: Health, Peace and Prosperity (Gilbertese: Te mauri, te raoi ao te tabomoa).
- North Korea: Strong and Prosperous Nation (Korean: 강성대국).
- South Korea: To broadly benefit the human world (Korean: 홍익인간; Hanja: 弘益人間; RR: Hongik Ingan).
- Kuwait: God, The Nation, The Emir (Arabic: الله, الوطن, الأمير).
- Laos: Peace, independence, democracy, unity and prosperity (Lao: ສັນຕິພາບ ເອກະລາດ ປະຊາທິປະໄຕ ເອກະພາບ ວັດທະນາຖາວອນ Santiphap, Ekalat, Paxathipatai, Ekaphap, Vatthanathavon)
- Lebanon: We are all for the Country, the Sublime and the Flag (Arabic: كلنا للوطن ، للعلا للعلم ).
- Lesotho: Peace, Rain, Prosperity (Sotho: Khotso, Pula, Nala).
- Liberia: The love of liberty brought us here
- Liechtenstein: For God, Prince and Fatherland (German: Für Gott, Fürst und Vaterland).
- Lithuania: No official motto. Freedom, Unity, Prosperity (Lithuanian: Laisvė, vienybė, gerovė) used on coins since 2015. May unity bloom! (Lithuanian: Vienybė težydi!) from the national anthem.
- Luxembourg: We want to remain what we are (Luxembourgish: Mir wëlle bleiwe wat mir sinn).
- Madagascar: Love, Ancestral-land, Progress (Malagasy: Fitiavana, Tanindrazana, Fandrosoana).
- Malawi: Unity and Freedom
- Malaysia: Unity is strength (Malay: Bersekutu Bertambah Mutu).
- Maldives: State of the Mahal Dibiyat (Arabic: الدولة المحلديبية; Al-Dawlat Al-Mahaldheebiya).
- Mali: One people, one goal, one faith (French: Un peuple, un but, une foi).
- Malta: Virtuous strength and consistency (Latin: Virtute et constantia).
- Marshall Islands: Accomplishment/Achievement through Joint Effort (Marshallese: Jepilpilin ke Ejukaan).
- Mauritania: Honor, Fraternity, Justice (Arabic: شرف، إخاء، عدالة, French: Honneur, Fraternité, Justice).
- Mauritius: Star and key of the Indian Ocean (Latin: Stella Clavisque Maris Indici).
- Mexico: No official motto, The Homeland is First (Spanish: La Patria es Primero) is the motto of the Mexican Congress.
- Micronesia: Peace, Unity, Liberty.
- Monaco: With God's help (Latin: Deo juvante).
- Montenegro: No official motto. Unofficial motto: May Montenegro be eternal! (Serbo-Croatian: Da je vječna Crna Gora! / Да је вјечна Црна Гора!). From the national anthem.
- Morocco: God, the Country, the King (Arabic: الله، الوطن، الملك; Allāh, Al-Waṭan, Al-Malīk). Sovereign's motto: If you aid God, He will aid you (Arabic: إن تَنصُروا اللهَ ينصُرُکُم ʾIn tanṣurū 'Ilaha yanṣurukum)
- Myanmar: Currently no official motto. Formerly: Happiness through harmony (Burmese: သမဂ္ဂါနံ တပေါ သုခေါ; Samaggānaṃ tapo sukho).
- Namibia: Unity, liberty, justice
- Nauru: God's will first
- The Emblem of Nepal features Janani Janma Bhumishcha Swargadapi Gariyasi
  Nepal: Mother and motherland are greater than heaven (Sanskrit: जननी जन्मभूमिश्च स्वर्गादपि गरीयसी; Janani Janmabhumishcha Swargadapi Gariyasi)
- Netherlands: I will maintain (French: Je maintiendrai, Dutch: Ik zal handhaven).
- New Zealand: No official motto, formerly Onward
- Nicaragua: In God We Trust (Spanish: En Dios Confiamos)
- Niger: Fraternity, Work, Progress (French: Fraternité, Travail, Progrès).
- Nigeria: Unity and Faith, Peace and Progress.
- Norway: No official motto. Royal motto of Haakon VIII: Everything for Norway (Norwegian: Alt for Norge) and Eidsvoll oath: United and loyal until the mountains of Dovre crumble (Norwegian: Enige og tro inntil Dovre faller/Einige og tru til Dovre fell)
- Oman: God, The Nation, The Sultan (Arabic: الله، الوطن، السلطان).

Pakistan: Īmān, Ittiḥād, Nazm. (Urdu "Faith, Unity, Discipline").

Panama: Pro mundi beneficio (Latin: "For the benefit of the world").

- Pakistan: Faith, Unity, Discipline (Urdu: ايمان، اتحاد، نظم; Iman, Ittihad, Nazm).
- Palestine: No official motto. Unofficial: From the river to the sea, Palestine will be free (Arabic: مِنْ اِلْنَهْرْ لِلْبَحْرْ، فِلَسْطِينْ حُرِّة).
- Panama: For the benefit of the world (Latin: Pro mundi beneficio).
- Papua New Guinea: Unity in Diversity.
- Paraguay: Peace and justice (Spanish: Paz y justicia).
- Peru: Firm and happy for the union (Spanish: Firme y feliz por la unión).
- Philippines: For God, for the people, for nature and for the country (Filipino: Maka-Diyos, Maka-Tao, Makakalikasan at Makabansa).
- Poland: No official motto. Unofficial mottos of Poland include: For our freedom and yours (Polish: Za wolność Naszą i Waszą); For Faith, Law and the People (Latin: Pro Fide, Lege et Grege), and God, Honour, Fatherland (Polish: Bóg, Honor, Ojczyzna).
- Portugal: This is my blissful beloved homeland (Esta é a ditosa Pátria minha amada)

The national motto of the Russian Empire: Съ нами Богъ! (S nami Bog!)

- Romania: No official motto. Formerly Nothing without God (Latin: Nihil sine Deo), which has been proposed to return. Before Nihil sine Deo, All for One (Romanian: Toți pentru unul) was used as the motto of Romania for a short period of time, still being a popular patriotic phrase to this day and an unofficial motto.
- Russia: No official motto. Unofficial mottos: Advance, Russia! (Russian: Вперёд, Россия); Russia will be free (Russian: Россия будет свободной)
- Rwanda: Unity, Work, Patriotism (Kinyarwanda: Ubumwe, Umurimo, Gukunda Igihugu)
- Sahrawi Arab Democratic Republic: Liberty, Democracy, Unity (Arabic: حرية، ديمقراطية، وحدة, Spanish: Libertad, Democracia, Unidad)
- Saint Kitts and Nevis: Country Above Self.
- Saint Lucia: The land, the people, the light.
- Saint Vincent and the Grenadines: Peace and justice (Latin: Pax et justitia)
- Samoa: God be the Foundation of Samoa (Samoan: Fa'avae i le Atua Samoa).
- San Marino: Liberty (Latin: Libertas)
- São Tomé and Príncipe: Unity, Discipline, Work (Portuguese: Unidade, Disciplina, Trabalho).
- Saudi Arabia: There is no God other than God and Muhammad is the Messenger of God (Arabic: لا إله إلا الله محمد رسول الله; Lā ʾilāha illā l-Lāh; Muḥammadu r-rasūlu l-Lāh).
- Senegal: One people, one goal, one faith (French: Un peuple, un but, une foi).
- Serbia: No official motto. Unofficial: Only Unity Saves the Serbs (Serbian: Само слога Србина спасава / Samo sloga Srbina spasava).
- Seychelles: The end crowns the work (Latin: Finis coronat opus).
- Sierra Leone: Unity, freedom, justice.
- Singapore: Onward Singapore (Malay: Majulah Singapura).
- Slovakia: Truth prevails (Slovak: Pravda víťazí). Formerly (1939–1945) Faithful to Ourselves, Together Ahead! (Slovak: Verní sebe, svorne napred!).
- Solomon Islands: To lead is to serve
- Somalia: No official motto. Currently unofficially and formerly officially (1947–2012) Arise Somalis! (Somali: Soomaaliyeey Toosoo!)
- South Africa: Diverse people unite or Unity in Diversity (ǀXam: ǃke e꞉ ǀxarra ǁke).
- South Sudan: Justice, Liberty, Prosperity
- Spain: Further beyond (Latin: Plus Ultra).
- Sudan: Victory is Ours (Arabic: النصر لنا; An-Naṣr Linā).
- Suriname: Justice, piety, loyalty (Latin: Justitia, pietas, fides).
- Sweden: No official national motto. Royal motto of Carl XVI Gustaf: For Sweden – with the Times (Swedish: För Sverige – i tiden).
- Switzerland: No official motto. Unofficial: One for all, all for one (Latin: Unus pro omnibus, omnes pro uno).

The national motto of the Kingdom of Siam, as shown on Chulalongkorn's coat of arms

- Taiwan: No official motto. Nationalism, Democracy, Welfare (Chinese: 民族、民權、民生) is the motto of the Kuomintang and ROC government.
- Tajikistan: Independence, Freedom, Homeland! (Tajik: Истиқлол, Озодӣ, Ватан! / Istiqlol, Ozodi, Vatan!).
- Tanzania: Freedom and Unity (Swahili: Uhuru na Umoja).
- Thailand: No official motto. Unofficial: Nation, Religion, King (Thai: ชาติ ศาสนา พระมหากษัตริย์; Chat, Satsana, Phra Mahakasat)
- Togo: Work, liberty, homeland (French: Travail, Liberté, Patrie).
- Tonga: God and Tonga are my Inheritance (Tongan: Ko e ʻOtua mo Tonga ko hoku tofiʻa).
- Trinidad and Tobago: Together we aspire, together we achieve.
- Tunisia: Freedom, Order, Justice (Arabic: حرية، نظام، عدالة; Ḥoṛiya, Niẓam, 'Adāla).
- Turkey: No official motto. The motto of the Parliament of Turkey: Sovereignty unconditionally belongs to the Nation (Turkish: Egemenlik kayıtsız şartsız milletindir). Other mottos: How happy is the one who says I am a Turk (Turkish: Ne mutlu Türk'üm diyene), Either independence or death (Turkish: Ya istiklâl ya ölüm), Peace at Home, Peace in the World (Turkish: Yurtta barış, dünyada barış, originally yurtta sulh, cihanda sulh).
- Turkmenistan: No official motto. Unofficial: Turkmenistan is the motherland of Neutrality (Turkmen: Türkmenistan Bitaraplygyň watanydyr!).

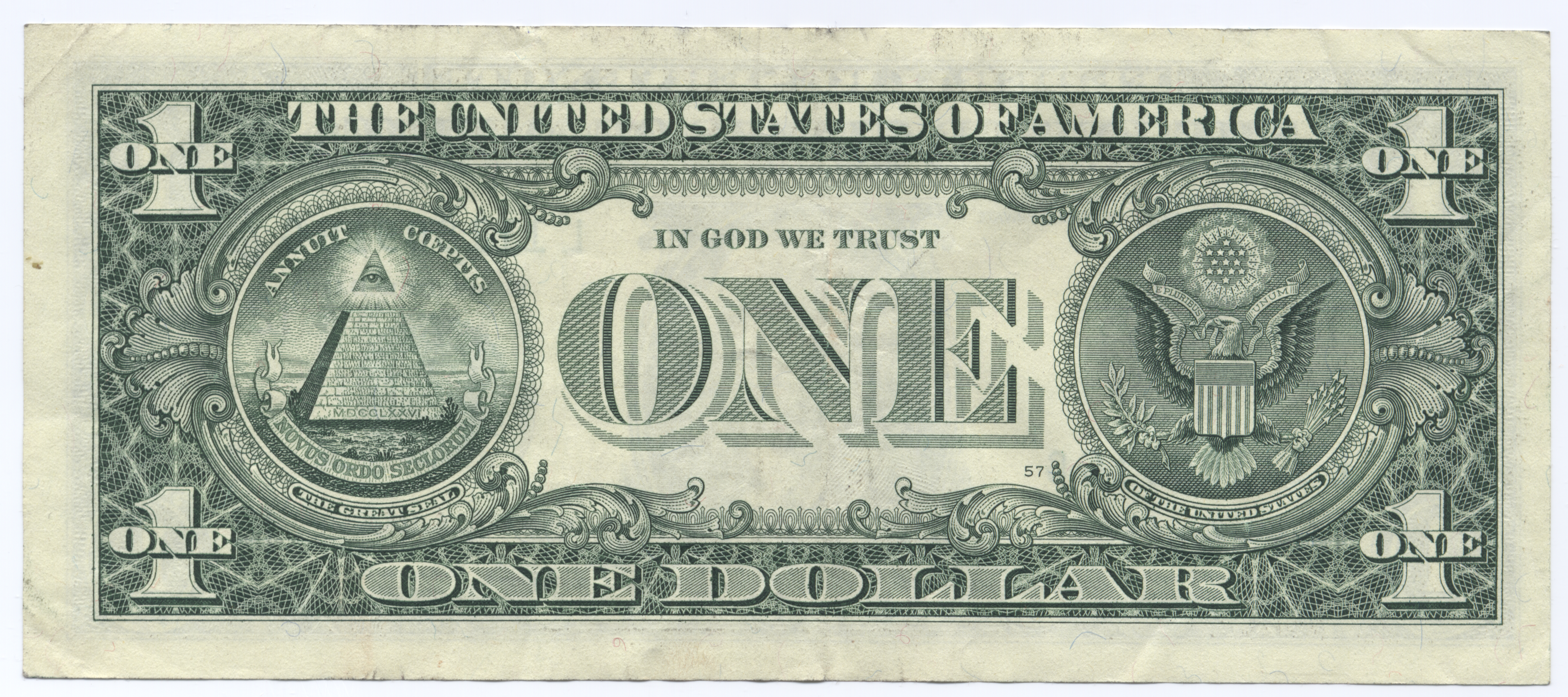
The national motto of the United States is In God We Trust, as shown on the reverse of the United States one-dollar bill.

- Tuvalu: Tuvalu for the Almighty (Tuvaluan: Tuvalu mo te Atua).
- Uganda: For God and My Country (Swahili: kwa mungu na nchi yangu, also in English).
- Ukraine: No official motto. Glory to Ukraine! Glory to the heroes! (Ukrainian: Слава Україні! Героям слава!, romanized: Slava Ukraini! Heroiam slava!; the transliteration of these slogans are also used in English) is the military greeting and de facto motto.
- United Kingdom: No official motto. Sovereign's motto: Dieu et mon droit (French: God and my right) in England, Wales and Northern Ireland; In My Defens God Me Defend in Scotland.
- United States: In God We Trust (official), E Pluribus Unum (Latin: Out of many, one), (de facto). See also list of U.S. state and territory mottos
- Uruguay: Liberty or Death (Spanish: Libertad o Muerte).
- Uzbekistan: The Strength is in The Justice! (Uzbek: Kuch adolatdadir! / Куч адолатдадир!)
- Vanuatu: In God we stand (Bislama: Long God yumi stanap).
- Vatican City: No official motto. Personal motto of Pope Leo XIV: In the one [Christ we are] one (Latin: In illo uno unum).
- Venezuela: Currently no official motto. Historical: God and Federation (Spanish: Dios y Federación).
- Vietnam: Independence, Liberty, Happiness (Vietnamese: Ðộc lập, Tự do, Hạnh phúc).
- Yemen: God, Homeland, Revolution, Unity (Arabic: الڷه، الوطن، الثورة، الوحدة; Allāh, Al-Waṭan, Ath-Thawrah, Al-Waḥdah).
- Zambia: One Zambia, One Nation
- Zimbabwe: Unity, Freedom, Work

== Semi-autonomous dependencies ==
- Andalusia: Andalucía por sí, para España y la Humanidad
  Andalusia for herself, for Spain and for Humanity (Spanish)
- Anguilla: Unity, Strength and Endurance
- American Samoa: Samoa Muamua le Atua
  Samoa, God is First (Samoan)
- Aruba: Semper progrediens
  Always progressing (Latin)
- Asturias: Hoc Signo Tuetur Pius, Hoc Signo Vincitur Inimicus
  With this sign thou shalt defend the pious, with this sign thou shalt defeat the enemy (Latin) (official, used in the coat of arms)
  Asturias, paraíso natural
  Asturias, natural paradise (Spanish) (often used for tourism)
  Asturies enxamás vencida
  Asturias, never defeated (Asturian) (used during the Peninsular War by the Junta General and still often used unofficially)
- Azores: Antes morrer livres que em paz sujeitos
  Rather die as free men than be enslaved in peace (Portuguese)
- (Basque Country (autonomous community)) Basque Country: Zazpiak Bat (Basque: The seven are one)
- Bermuda: Quo fata ferunt (Latin: Whither the fates carry us)
- British Antarctic Territory: Research and Discovery
- British Indian Ocean Territory: In tutela nostra Limuria (Latin: "Limuria is in our charge")
- British Virgin Islands: Unofficial Vigilate (Latin: Be watchful)
- Brittany: Kentoc'h mervel eget bezañ saotret (Breton: Rather death than dishonour)
- Canary Islands: Océano (Spanish: Ocean)
- Catalonia: No official motto. Traditional motto / unofficial: Som i Serem (Catalan: "We are and We will be")
- Cayman Islands: He hath founded it upon the seas
- Cocos (Keeling) Islands: Maju Pulu Kita (Cocos Islands Malay: Onward our island)
- Easter Island: Traditional motto / unofficial; He hanga te Atu'a he pakea te ma'eha ote mori nei ite he nua ta'atoa (Rapa Nui: "May God let the clarity of this vital light be extended to all peoples")
- Falkland Islands: Desire the Right
- French Southern and Antarctic Lands: Liberté, égalité, fraternité (French: Liberty, equality, fraternity)
- French Polynesia: Tahiti Nui Māre'are'a (Tahitian: Great Tahiti of the Golden Haze)
- Galicia: Hoc hic mysterium fidei firmiter profitemur (Latin: "Here, we firmly profess this mystery of faith")
- Gibraltar: Montis Insignia Calpi (Latin: Badge of the Rock of Gibraltar) and Nulli Expugnabilis Hosti (Latin: Conquerable by no enemy)
- Irkutsk Oblast: Babr
- Isle of Man: Quocunque Ieceris Stabit (Latin: Whithersoever you throw it, it will stand)
- Kurdistan Region: No official motto. Unofficial motto/proverb: ھیچ دۆستێک جگە لە چیاکان (Kurdish: "No friends but the mountains"). Also used is the title of the regional anthem "Ey Reqîb" (Kurdish: "O, Enemy")
- Madeira: Das Ilhas, As Mais Belas E Livres (Portuguese: Of the Islands, the Most Beautiful and Free)
- Montserrat: A people of excellence, moulded by nature, nurtured by God
- New Caledonia: Terre de parole, terre de partage (French: Land of speech, land of sharing)
- Niue: Atua, Niue Tukulagi (Niuean: God, Niue Eternally)
- Nuevo León: Semper Ascendens (Latin: Always Ascending).
- Puerto Rico: Joannes est nomen ejus (Latin: "John is his name"). Taken from the Vulgate translation of Luke 1:63, referring to the fact that the island's former name was "San Juan" (now the capital's name) in honour of Saint John the Baptist.
- Réunion: Florebo quocumque ferar (Latin: I will flourish wherever I am brought)
- Saba: Remis velisque (Latin: With oars and sails)
- Saint Helena: Loyal and unshakeable
- Saint Pierre and Miquelon: A Mare Labor (Latin: From the Sea, Work)
- Scotland: Sovereign's motto: In My Defens God Me Defend (Often shown abbreviated as IN DEFENS) and Nemo Me Impune Lacessit (Latin: No-one provokes me with impunity)
- Sicily: An.Tu.Do. ANimus TUus DOminus (Latin: Courage is your lord).
- Sint Maarten: Semper progrediens (Latin: Always progressing)
- South Georgia and the South Sandwich Islands: Leo terram propriam protegat (Latin: "Let the lion protect his own land")
- Tatarstan: No official motto. Unofficial: We can! (Tatar: Без Булдырабыз!, romanized: Bez Buldırabız!)
- Tokelau: Tokelau mo te Atua (Tokelauan: Tokelau For The Almighty)
- Tristan da Cunha: Our faith is our strength
- Wales: Cymru am byth (Welsh: Wales Forever, alternatively Long live Wales)
- Wallis and Futuna: Liberté, égalité, fraternité (French: Liberty, equality, fraternity)
- U.S. Virgin Islands: United In Pride And Hope
- Zanzibar: Zanzibar kwa Afrika; Zanzibar kwa ajili ya Dunia (Swahili: "Zanzibar for Africa — Zanzibar for the world")
- Åland: Islands of Peace

== Historical countries ==
- Austria-Hungary: Indivisibiliter ac Inseparabiliter (Latin: "Indivisible and inseparable unity").
- Azerbaijan Democratic Republic: Bir kərə yüksələn bayraq bir daha enməz! (Azerbaijani: "The flag once raised will never fall!")
- Kingdom of Bavaria: In Treue fest (German: "Steadfast in loyalty")
- Republic of Biafra: Peace, Unity, Freedom
- Byelorussian Soviet Socialist Republic: Пралетарыі ўсіх краін, яднайцеся! (Praletaryi ŭsich krain, jadnajciesja!) (Belarusian: Workers of the world, unite!)
- Empire of Brazil: Independência ou Morte! (Portuguese: Independence or Death!)
- Byzantine Empire: "King of Kings, Ruling Over Kings" (Greek: βασιλεὺς βασιλέων, βασιλεύων βασιλευόντων; Basileus Basileōn, Basileuōn Basileuontōn) under the Palaiologos dynasty.
- Republic of China (Mainland period): No official motto. Unofficial: Nationalism, Democracy, Welfare (Chinese: 民族、民權、民生), the historical motto of the Kuomintang and the Nationalist government.
- Confederate States of America: Deo vindice (Latin: With God as our defender/protector)
- Czechoslovakia (1918–1993): Pravda vítězí (Czech), Pravda víťazí (Slovak), Veritas vincit (Latin), all meaning "Truth prevails"
- Republic of the Seven United Netherlands: Concordia res parvae crescunt (Small things flourish by concord; Literally translated as: Together the small will grow)
- Ethiopian Empire ሞዓ አንበሰ ዘአምነባደ ይሁዳ (Moa Ambassa ze Imnegede Yehuda) (Ge'ez: Conquering Lion of the Tribe of Judah).
- Republic of Florence: Regna cadunt luxu surgunt virtutibus urbes! (Latin: Fall, you kingdoms of luxury, for the cities of virtue shall thrive!)
- French First Republic: Various mottos ranging from "Liberty, Equality, Fraternity, or Death." (French: Liberté, Égalité, Fraternité ou la Mort) to "Unity, indivisibility of the Republic; liberty, equality, brotherhood or death" (French: Unité, Indivisibilité de la République; Liberté, Egalité, Fraternité ou la mort).
- Kingdom of France: Montjoie Saint Denis! (French)
- Vichy France (1940–1944): Travail, Famille, Patrie (French: Work, Family, Homeland)
- Kingdom of Galicia: Hoc hic mysterium fidei firmiter profitemur (Latin: Here is the mystery of faith that we strongly profess)
- West Germany (1949–1990): Einigkeit und Recht und Freiheit (German: Unity and justice and freedom)
- East Germany (1949–1990): Proletarier aller Länder, vereinigt Euch! (German: Workers of all countries, unite!)
- German Empire (1871–1918): Gott mit uns (German: God with us)
- Nazi Germany (1933–1945): Ein Volk, Ein Reich, Ein Führer (German: One People, One Realm, One Leader.)
- Kingdom of Greece (1832–1924 and 1935–67): Ίσχύς μου ή άγάπη του λαού (Iskhis mou i ayapi tou laou) (Greek: The love of the people is my strength)
- Habsburg Monarchy: A.E.I.O.U. "All the world is subject to Austria" (German: Alles Erdreich ist Österreich untertan. Latin: Austria est imperare orbis universo)
- Hawaiian Kingdom: Ua Mau ke Ea o ka ʻĀina i ka Pono (Hawaiian: The life of the land is perpetuated in righteousness)
- Imperial State of Iran: مرا داد فرمود و خود داور است (Marā dād farmūd-o khod dāvar ast) (Persian: Justice He bids me do, as He will judge me).
- Kingdom of Italy: Foedere et Religione Tenemur (FERT) (Latin: We are held together by pact and by religion), Fortitudo Eius Rempublicam Tenet (FERT) (Latin: 'His bravery [or strength] preserves [or defends] the state')
- Ireland Irish Catholic Confederation: Hiberni unanimes pro Deo Rege et Patria (Latin: Irishmen united for God, king and country)
- Italian Social Republic: Per l'onore d'Italia (Italian: For the honor of Italy)
- Korean Empire: 광명천지 (光明天地, Kwangmyeong Cheonji) "Let there be light across the land"
- First Mexican Empire: Independencia, Unión, Religion (Spanish: "Independence, Union, Religion"), the three guarantees.
- Second Mexican Empire: Equidad en la Justicia (Spanish: "Equity in Justice")
- Netherlands Antilles: Libertate Unanimus (Latin: United in Freedom)
- Newfoundland: Quaerite Prime Regnum Dei (Latin: Seek ye first the kingdom of God)
- Crown Colony of North Borneo: Pergo et Perago (Latin: I undertake and I achieve)
- Ottoman Empire: دولت ابد مدت (Devlet-i Ebed-müddet) (Turkish: "The Eternal State")
- (Philippines) Fourth Philippine Republic: Isang Bansa, Isang Diwa (Filipino: "One Country, One Spirit"). Abolished after the 1986 People Power Revolution.
- Polish–Lithuanian Commonwealth: Pro fide, lege, et rege (Latin: "For Faith, Law, and King"); Si Deus nobiscum quis contra nos? (Latin: If God is with us, then who is against us?)
- Kingdom of Portugal: In Hoc Signo Vinces (Latin: "By this sign you shall conquer"). In a legend retold in the national epic Os Lusiadas by Luís Vaz de Camões, the first King of Portugal saw the Quinas (the five blue inescutcheons with silver bezants), in a miracle, during the Battle of Ourique. The usage of this motto is well documented on coins, monuments and documents.
- Prussia: Suum cuique (Latin: "To each his own") 1525–1947
- Republic of Ragusa: Sloboda se ne prodaje za sve zlato svijeta (Croatian: Freedom is not sold for all the gold in the world)
- Rhodesia: Sit Nomine Digna (Latin: May she be worthy of the name)
- Russian Empire: Съ нами Богъ! (S nami Bog!) (Russian: God is with us!) and За Вѣру, Царя и Отечество! (Za Veru, Tsarya i Otechestvo!) (Russian: For Faith, For Tsar, For Fatherland)
- Russian State: Единая и Неделимая Россия! (Yedinaya i Nedelimaya Rossiya!) (Russian: United and Indivisible Russia!) and Симъ побѣдиши! (Sim pobedishi!) (Russian: In this, conquer!)
- Roman Empire and previously Roman Republic: Senatus Populusque Romanus (Latin: The Senate and people of Rome, often abbreviated SPQR)
- Union of South Africa: Ex Unitate Vires (Latin: Union is Strength)
- Upper Volta: Unité, Travail, Justice (French: Unity, Work, Justice)
- Raj of Sarawak: Dum Spiro, Spero (Latin: "While I breathe, I hope")
- Kingdom of Scotland: In my defens God me defend
- Shanghai International Settlement: Omnia Juncta in Uno (Latin: "All Joined into One")
- (Thailand) Siam (1873–1910) : สพฺเพสํ สงฺฆภูตานํ สามคฺคี วุฑฺฒิ สาธิกา (Pāli: शब्बेसम् सम्घभुतनम् समग्घि भुद्धि सधिक, Sabbesaṃ saṃghabhūtānaṃ samagghī vuḍḍhi sadhikā, "Unity amongst those uniting brings about success and prosperity")
- Soviet Union: Пролетарии всех стран, соединяйтесь! (Proletarii vsekh stran, soyedinyaytes'!) (Russian: Proletarians of all nations, unite!), also translated into the languages of the other fourteen republics
- South Yemen: لنناضل من أجل الدفاع عن الثورة اليمنية، وتنفيذ الخطة الخمسية، وتحقيق الوحدة اليمنية (Arabic: For the struggle to defend the Yemeni revolution, implement the five-year plan, and achieve the Yemeni unification)
- Francoist Spain: Una, Grande y Libre (Spanish: One, Great and Free) and Plus Ultra (Latin: Further Beyond)
- Republic of Texas: Remember the Alamo
- Republic of Venice: Pax tibi Marce, evangelista meus (Latin: "Peace be to you Mark, my evangelist")
- North Vietnam: Ðộc lập, Tự do, Hạnh phúc (Vietnamese: Independence, Liberty, Happiness)
- Wallachia: Dreptate, Frăție (Romanian: "Justice, Brotherhood").
- West Indies Federation: To dwell together in unity
- Kingdom of Württemberg: Furchtlos und treu (German: Fearless and faithful)
- Yugoslavia: "Brotherhood and unity". (Serbo-Croatian: Братство и јединство / Bratstvo i jedinstvo, Macedonian: Братство и единство, Slovene: Bratstvo in enotnost, Albanian: Vllaznim-Bashkim, later Vëllazërim-Bashkim, Hungarian: Testvériség és egység, Romanian: Frăție și unitate, Ukrainian: Братерство і єдність)
- Zaire: Paix — Justice — Travail (French: Peace — Justice — Work)
