= State emblem of Pakistan =

State emblem of Pakistan پاکستان کا قومی نشان
- Armiger: Islamic Republic of Pakistan
- Adopted: 1954
- Crest: A mullet and crescent increscent, both vert
- Shield: Quarterly, first vert a lozenge argent, charged with a cotton flower argent, second argent with tea stalk vert, third argent charged with a garb of wheat vert, fourth party fer fess argent and vert four jute stalks eradicated counterchanged
- Supporters: Two jasmine branches embowed vert in their natural colors
- Compartment: Ribbon vert, backed argent upon which is written in argent the word national motto in the Urdu language.
- Motto: ایمان، اتحاد، نظم "Faith, Unity, Discipline"

The state emblem of Pakistan mixes traditional and modern symbols and symbolises the ideological foundation of the country, the basis of its economy, cultural heritage, and guiding principles.

== History ==
Punjabi artist Abdur Rahman Chughtai was the designer of the first state emblem for Pakistan. On 18 May 1948, the design was approved by Muhammad Ali Jinnah, governor-general of Pakistan. The second design was adopted in 1954. It was designed by Meraj Muhammad, an artist from Dera Ghazi Khan, who was an alumnus of the Mayo School of Arts.

== Design ==
The four components of the emblem are a crescent and star crest above an escutcheon, which is surrounded by a wreath, below which is a scroll. The crest and the green color of the emblem are considered traditional symbols of Islam. The quartered shield in the center shows cotton, wheat, tea, and jute, which were the major crops of Pakistan at independence and are shown in the form of escutcheon and signify the main agricultural base for the importance of the Nation's economy. The floral wreath, surrounding the shield, is Jasminum officinale (the national flower) and represents the floral designs used in traditional Mughal art and emphasizes the cultural heritage of Pakistan. The scroll supporting the shield contains the national motto in Urdu, "Īmān, Ittiḥād, Naẓm", which reads from right to left: (ایمان، اتحاد، نظم), translated as "Faith, Unity, Discipline" which are intended as the guiding principles for Pakistan.

== Other emblems in Pakistan ==
=== Former state emblems (1947–1972) ===
Emblem of the Dominion of Pakistan (1947–1954)

Emblem of the Islamic Republic of Pakistan (1954–1972)

=== Emblems of national bodies ===
Emblem of the Supreme Court

Emblem of the Federal Shariat Court

Emblem of the Election Commission

Emblem of the Election Commission (1956–1972)

Emblem of the Oil and Gas Regulatory Authority

Emblem of President of Pakistan (1956-present)

== Regional emblems ==
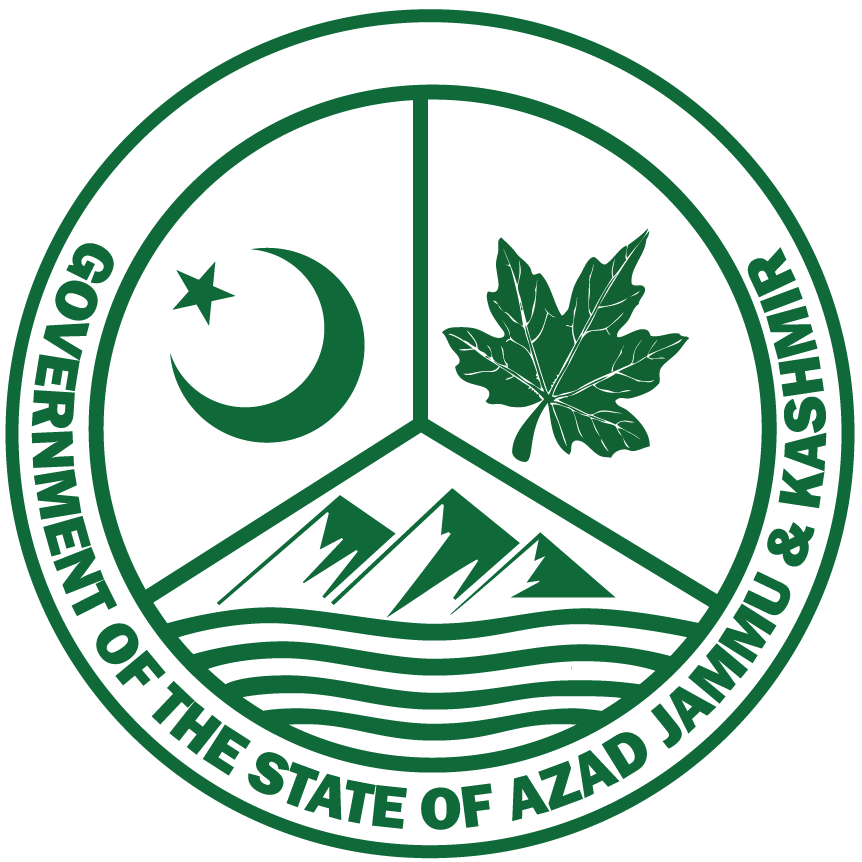
Emblem of Azad Kashmir

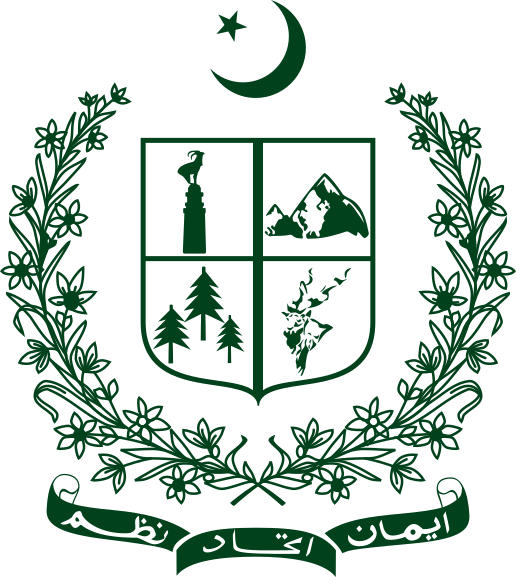
Emblem of Gilgit-Baltistan

Emblem of Khyber Pakhtunkhwa

Emblem of Sindh

Emblem of Punjab

Emblem of Balochistan

=== Former regional emblems ===
State of Bahawalpur

State of Chitral

Emblem of East Bengal

Emblem of East Pakistan (1956–1970)

Emblem of East Pakistan (1970–1971)

Hunza

Emblem of the North-West Frontier Province (now Khyber Pakhtunkhwa)

Emblem of the Federally Administered Tribal Areas

Emblem of West Pakistan

== See also ==
- Flag of Pakistan
- National Anthem of Pakistan
