= Faith, Unity, Discipline =

National motto of Pakistan

State emblem of Pakistan

Faith, Unity, Discipline (Urdu: ایمان، اتحاد، نظم, romanized: Īmān, Ittiḥād, Naẓm) is the national motto of Pakistan, regarded as the guiding principle of Pakistani nationhood. It is derived from the principles laid down by Muhammad Ali Jinnah, the founding father of Pakistan. The motto was officially adopted in 1948, and was inscribed on the national emblem of Pakistan (originally in both Urdu and Bengali) in 1954.

Upon the independence of Pakistan, it was introduced and adopted as the national motto by the country's founder Muhammad Ali Jinnah. It is inscribed in Urdu at the base of the state emblem. The emblem itself is an adaptation of four components: wreath, crescent, star and scroll, with all components in the shield bounded by the wreath of the jasmine flower, and the crescent and star crest depicted at the top.

== Origin ==
The words "ঈমান, একতা, শৃঙ্খলা" in Bengali language was also added to the banner before 1973.

The origin of the motto is derived from the country's founding father Muhammad Ali Jinnah. Jinnah related it to his personal example of life, and instilled a message to the youth of his time, as well as for Pakistan's future generations.

On 28 December 1947, four months after the emergence of Pakistan on the world's map, Jinnah said:

"We are going through fire: the sunshine has yet to come. But I have no doubt that with Unity, Faith and Discipline we will compare with any nation of the world. Are you prepared to undergo the fire? You must make up your minds now. We must sink individualism and petty jealousies and make up our minds to serve the people with honesty and faithfulness. We are passing through a period of fear, danger, and menace. We must have faith, unity and discipline."

Jinnah delivered many addresses describing faith, unity and discipline. On 23 March 1945, he said:

"In Pakistan lies our deliverance, defence and honour…In our solidarity, unity and discipline lie the strength, power and sanction behind us to carry on this fight successfully. No sacrifice should be considered too great. I can assure you that there is nothing greater in this world than your own conscience and, when you appear before God, you can say that you performed your duty with the highest sense of integrity, honesty and with loyalty and faithfulness."

On 11 September 1948, Jinnah gave his last message:

"The foundations of your state have been laid and it is now for you to build and build as quickly and as well as you can. Pakistan is proud of her youth, particularly the students, who are nation builders of tomorrow. They must fully equip themselves by discipline, education, and training for the arduous task lying ahead of them. With faith, discipline, unity and selfless devotion to duty, there is nothing worthwhile that you cannot achieve."

In Urdu
In Bengali
In English
Urdu script
Roman Urdu transliteration
Bengali script
Roman Bengali transliteration

ایمان، اتحاد، نظم

Īmān, Ittiḥād, Naẓm

ঈমান, একতা, শৃঙ্খলা

Īmān, Ēkatā, Śr̥ṅkhalā

Faith, Unity, Discipline

== Popular connotations ==
Popular connotations also include:

in English

- Unity, Faith, Discipline
- Unity, Faith and Discipline

in Bengali Transliteration

- Iman, Ekota, Sringkhola

In Urdu Transliteration

- Iman, Ittehad, Nazm
- Iman, Ittehad, Tanzeem
- Iman, Ittehad, Munazam
- Ittehad, Yaqeen, Tanzeem
- Ittehad, Tanzeem, Yaqeen-e-Mohkam

== See also ==
- National symbols of Pakistan
