= Denmark–Norway =

Political union (1537–1814)

Denmark–Norway Danmark–Norge (Danish and Bokmål) Danmark–Noreg (Nynorsk)
- 1537–1814
- Dannebrog (official flag since 1625) Coat of arms (1699–1814)
- Motto: Regna firmat pietas ("Piety strengthens the realms"); Used from 1588–1648
- Map of Denmark–Norway, c. 1780
- Status: Dual monarchy (Real union) (1537–1814)
- Capital: Copenhagen
- Official languages: Danish; German; Latin
- Common languages: Norwegian; Icelandic; Faroese; Sámi languages Kven; North Frisian
- Religion: Lutheran
- Government: Denmark: Elective monarchy (1537–1660); Hereditary absolute monarchy (1660–1814); Norway: Hereditary monarchy (de jure 1537–1814, de facto 1537–1661); Hereditary absolute monarchy (de facto 1661–1814)
- King
  - 1537–1559: Christian III (first)
  - 1588–1648: Christian IV (longest)
  - 1648–1670: Frederick III
  - 1808–1814^{a}: Frederick VI (last)
- Legislature: Denmark: Council of State (1537–1660); None (1660–1814); Norway: None (1537–1807); Government commission (1807–1810)
- Historical era: Early modern Europe
  - Gustav Vasa elected King of Sweden: 6 June 1523
  - Kalmar Union collapsed: 1537
  - Norwegian riksråd abolished: 1537
  - Treaty of Brömsebro: 13 August 1645
  - Treaty of Roskilde: 26 February 1658
  - Danish rigsråd abolished: 14 October 1660
  - Lex Regia confirms absolutism: 14 November 1665
  - Treaty of Kiel: 14 January 1814
  - Congress of Vienna: September 1814 – June 1815

Area
- 1800: 2,655,567 km^{2} (1,025,320 sq mi)

Population
  - 1645^{b}: 1,315,000
  - 1801^{c}: 1,859,000
- Currency: Danish rigsdaler (1625–1814); Norwegian rigsdaler (1625–1814)
Preceded by
Kalmar Union
Succeeded by
Danish Unitary State
Sweden–Norway
Norway
County of Larvik (1814–1817)
- Today part of: Denmark; Norway; Iceland; Germany
- a: Frederick VI was regent for his father, so ruled as de facto king from 14 April 1784; he continued to rule Denmark after the Treaty of Kiel until his death on 3 December 1839.; b: Estimated 825,000 in Denmark, 440,000 in Norway and 50,000 in Iceland; c: 929,000 in Denmark, 883,000 in Norway and 47,000 in Iceland

Denmark–Norway (Note: (Danish and Norwegian: Danmark–Norge; also known as the Dano-Norwegian Realm (Det dansk-norske rige), Twin Realms (Tvillingerigerne) or the Oldenburg Monarchy (Oldenburg-monarkiet)) was a 16th-to-19th-century multi-national and multi-lingual real union consisting of the Kingdom of Denmark, the Kingdom of Norway (including the then Norwegian overseas possessions: the Faroe Islands, Iceland, Greenland, and other possessions), the Duchy of Schleswig, and the Duchy of Holstein. The state also claimed sovereignty over three historical peoples: Frisians, Gutes and Wends. Denmark–Norway had several colonies, namely the Danish Gold Coast, Danish India (the Nicobar Islands, Serampore, Tharangambadi), and the Danish West Indies.

The state's inhabitants were mainly Danes, Norwegians and Germans, and also included Faroese, Icelanders and Inuit in the Norwegian overseas possessions, a Sami minority in northern Norway, as well as other indigenous peoples. The main cities of Denmark–Norway were Copenhagen, Christiania (Oslo), Altona, Bergen and Trondhjem, and the primary official languages were Danish and German, but Norwegian, Icelandic, Faroese, Sami and Greenlandic were also spoken locally.

In 1380, Olaf II of Denmark inherited the Kingdom of Norway, titled as Olaf IV, after the death of his father Haakon VI of Norway, who was married to Olaf's mother Margaret I. Margaret I was ruler of Norway from her son's death in 1387 until her own death in 1412. Denmark, Norway, and Sweden established and formed the Kalmar Union in 1397. Following Sweden's departure in 1523, the union was effectively dissolved. From 1536/1537, Denmark and Norway formed a personal union that would eventually develop into the 1660 integrated state called Denmark–Norway by modern historians, at the time sometimes referred to as the "Twin Kingdoms". Prior to 1660, Denmark–Norway was de jure a constitutional and elective monarchy in which the King's power was somewhat limited; in that year it became one of the most stringent absolute monarchies in Europe, and was shortly thereafter, in 1665, formalized by an absolutist constitution, the King's Law.

The Dano-Norwegian union lasted until 1814, when the Treaty of Kiel decreed that Norway (except for the Faroe Islands, Iceland, and Greenland) be ceded to Sweden. The treaty however was not recognized by Norway, which resisted the attempt in the 1814 Swedish–Norwegian War. Norway thereafter entered into a much looser personal union with Sweden until 1905, when that union was peacefully dissolved.

== Usage and extent ==
The term "Kingdom of Denmark" is sometimes used incorrectly to include both countries in the period, since most of the political and economic power emanated from the city of Copenhagen in Denmark. These term also cover the "royal territories" of the Oldenburgs as it was in 1460, but excluding the "ducal territories" of Schleswig and Holstein. The administration used two official languages, Danish and German, and for several centuries, both a Danish Chancellery (Danish: Danske Kancelli) and German Chancellery (Danish: Tyske Kancelli) existed.

The term "Denmark–Norway" reflects the historical and legal roots of the union. It is adopted from the Oldenburg dynasty's official title. The kings always used the style "King of Denmark and Norway, the Wends and the Goths" (Konge af Danmark og Norge, de Venders og Gothers). Denmark and Norway, sometimes referred to as the "Twin Realms" (Tvillingerigerne) of Denmark–Norway, had separate legal codes and currencies, and mostly separate governing institutions. Following the introduction of absolutism in 1660, the centralisation of government meant a concentration of institutions in Copenhagen. Centralisation was supported in many parts of Norway, where the two-year attempt by Sweden to control Trøndelag had met strong local resistance and resulted in a complete failure for the Swedes and a devastation of the province. This allowed Norway to further secure itself militarily for the future through closer ties with the capital Copenhagen.

== Colonies ==
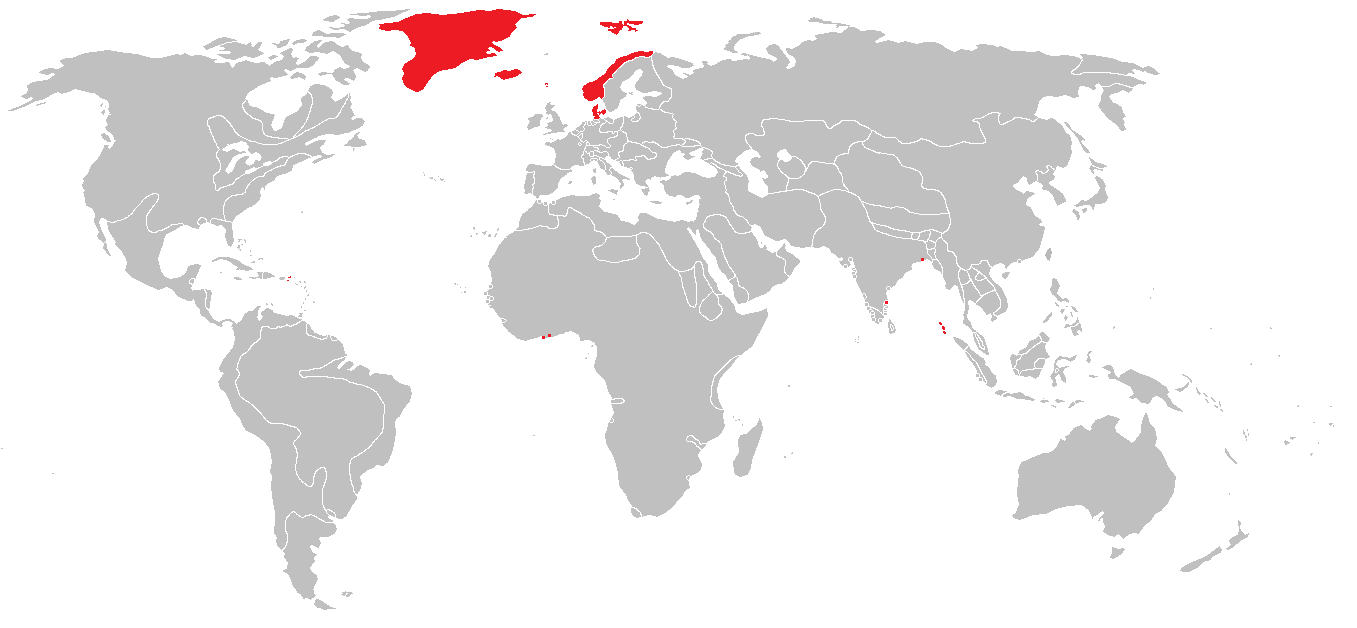
Denmark–Norway and its possessions, c. 1800

Throughout the time of Denmark–Norway, it continuously had possession over various overseas territories. At the earliest times this meant areas in Northern Europe and North America, for instance Estonia and the Norwegian possessions of Greenland, the Faroe Islands and Iceland.

From the 17th century, the kingdoms acquired colonies in Africa, the Caribbean and India. At its height the empire was about 2,655,564.76 km^{2} (1,025,319 sq mi), (Note: Possessions of Denmark–Norway (as of 1800): Denmark: 42,925.46 km^{2} (16,573.61 sq mi); Norway: 324,220 km^{2} (125,180 sq mi); Schleswig-Holstein: 15,763.18 km^{2} (6,086.20 sq mi); Greenland: 2,166,086 km^{2} (836,330 sq mi); Iceland: 103,000 km^{2} (40,000 sq mi); Faroe Islands: 1,399 km^{2} (540 sq mi); Danish India: 1,648.13 km^{2} (636.35 sq mi); Danish West Indies: 400 km^{2} (150 sq mi); Danish Gold Coast: 126 km^{2} (49 sq mi)) after the dissolution of the union, in 1814, all the overseas territories became a part of Denmark.

=== India ===
Denmark–Norway maintained numerous colonies from the 17th to 19th centuries over various parts around India. Colonies included the town of Tranquebar and Serampore. The last settlements Denmark had control over were sold to the United Kingdom in 1845. Rights in the Nicobar Islands were sold in 1869.

=== Caribbean ===
Centred on the Virgin Islands, Denmark–Norway established the Danish West Indies. This colony was one of the longest-lived of Denmark, until it was sold to the United States in 1917. It became the U.S. Virgin Islands.

=== West Africa ===
In the Gold Coast region of West Africa, Denmark–Norway also over time had control over various colonies and forts. The last remaining forts were sold to the United Kingdom in 1850, from Denmark.

== History ==
=== Origins of the Union ===
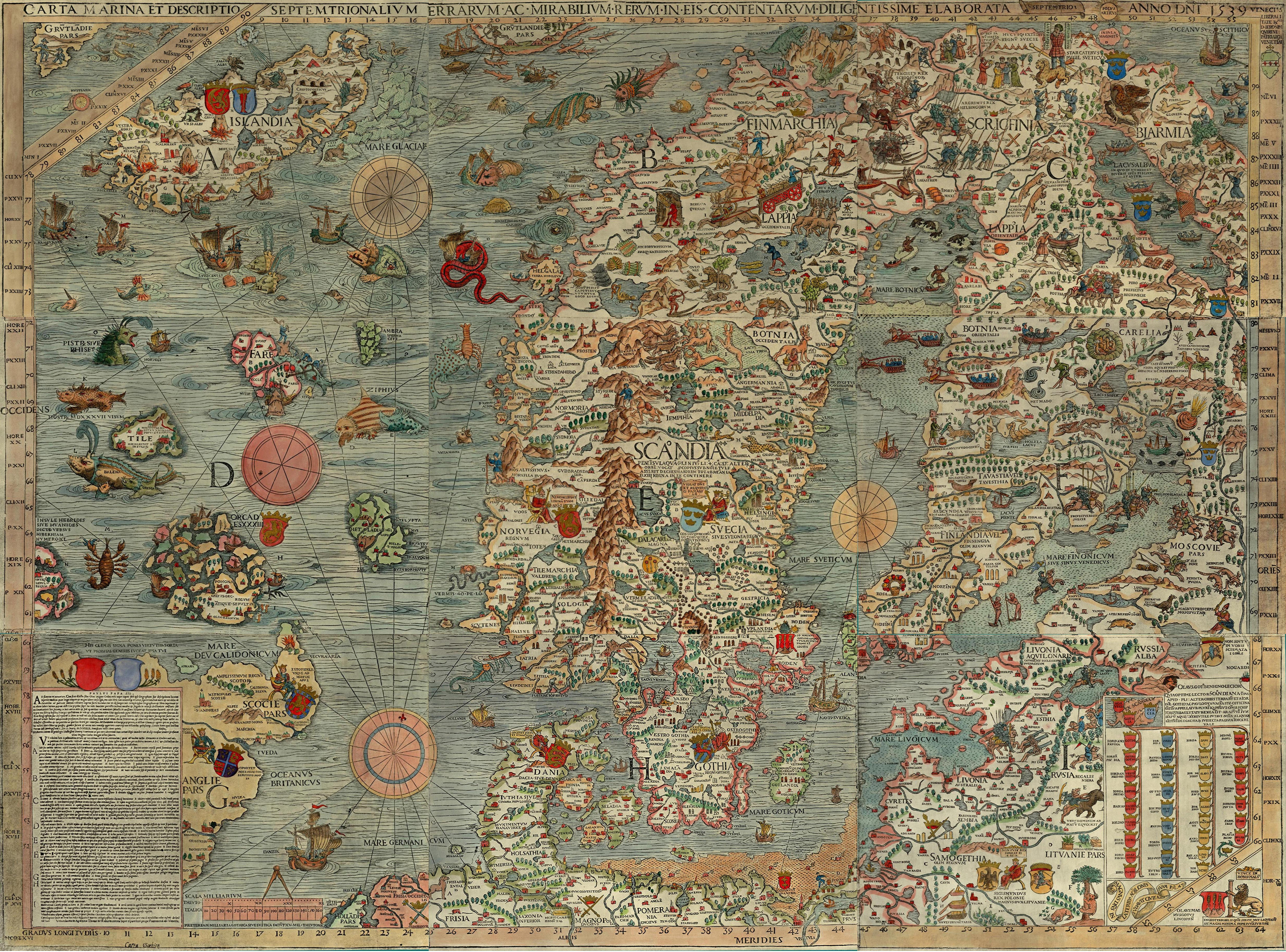
The Carta marina, an early map of the Nordic countries, made around the end of the Kalmar Union and the start of Denmark–Norway

The three kingdoms of Denmark, Norway and Sweden united in the Kalmar Union in 1397. Sweden broke out of this union and re-entered it several times, until 1521, when Sweden finally left the Union, leaving Denmark–Norway (including overseas possessions in the North Atlantic and the island of Saaremaa in modern Estonia). During the Count's Feud, where the Danish crown was contested between Protestant Oldenburg King Christian III and Catholic King Christian II, the relatively Catholic realm of Norway also wished to leave the union in the 1530s, but was unable to do so due to Denmark's superior military might. Following this, King Christian III completely united the two kingdoms to reduce the chances of further uprisings, and made Lutheranism the state religion in both kingdoms.

=== Baltic Ambitions ===
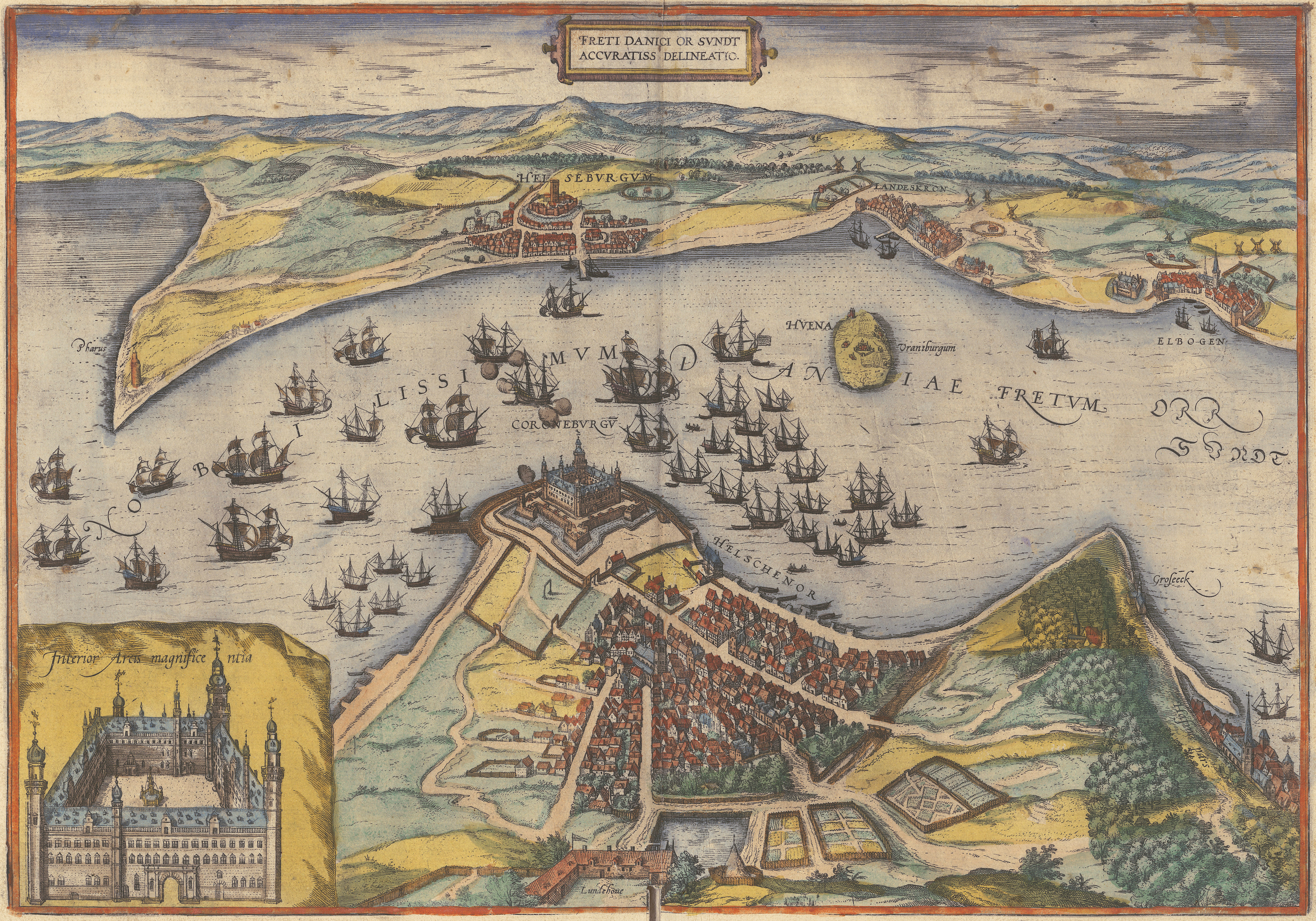
Artwork depicting ships passing by the city of Helsingør, which overlooked the Oresund

The Baltic Sea was one of the most lucrative trade spots in Europe. The German Hanseatic League used to be the dominant party in the region, but the slow collapse of the League allowed for Denmark–Norway to begin enforcing their control in the area. Denmark–Norway had a powerful navy, and with their control over the Oresund were able to enforce the Sound Tolls, a tax on passing ships. These tolls made up two thirds of Denmark–Norway’s state income, allowing kings such as Christian IV to become extremely rich.

Denmark–Norway also sought to expand into the eastern Baltic Sea. They controlled the island of Gotland, which was a major trading post, and using his wealth, King Frederick II purchased the island of Osel in 1560. Denmark–Norway fiercely guarded their hegemony, destroying any new competitors in the Baltic. When Poland-Lithuania attempted to build a navy in 1571, the Danish–Norwegian fleet destroyed or captured much of the Polish fleet in the Battle of Hel.

=== Northern Seven Years' War ===
Christian III, who had relied on Swedish aid in the Count's Feud, kept peaceful relations with Sweden throughout his reign. However, Frederick II was quite hostile towards the Swedes.

Another major factor in the war were Sweden's goals in Livonia. Both Denmark–Norway and Sweden, along with Russia, sought to control the previously Hanseatic region, as it was extremely important in controlling the Baltic Sea. When Denmark purchased Osel, Duke Magnus, brother of King Frederick II was granted control of the island. Magnus attempted to claim himself King of Estonia, but he was kicked out by the Russian army. The Estonians, who were fearful of the Russians, contacted King Eric XIV of Sweden for protection. Sweden then annexed Estonia, securing the region under their rule.

After Eric introduced blockades in an attempt to hinder trade with Russia (Sweden and Russia were disputing over Estonia), Lübeck and the Polish–Lithuanian Commonwealth joined Denmark–Norway in a war alliance. Attempts at diplomacy were made, but neither party was particularly interested in peace. When Frederick II included the traditionally Swedish insignia of three crowns into his own coat of arms, the Swedes interpreted this as a Danish claim over Sweden. In response, Erik XIV of Sweden (reigned 1560–1568) added the insignia of Norway and Denmark to his own coat of arms.

Denmark–Norway then carried out some naval attacks on Sweden, which effectively started the war. After seven years of fighting, the conflict concluded in 1570 with a status quo ante bellum.

=== Kalmar War ===
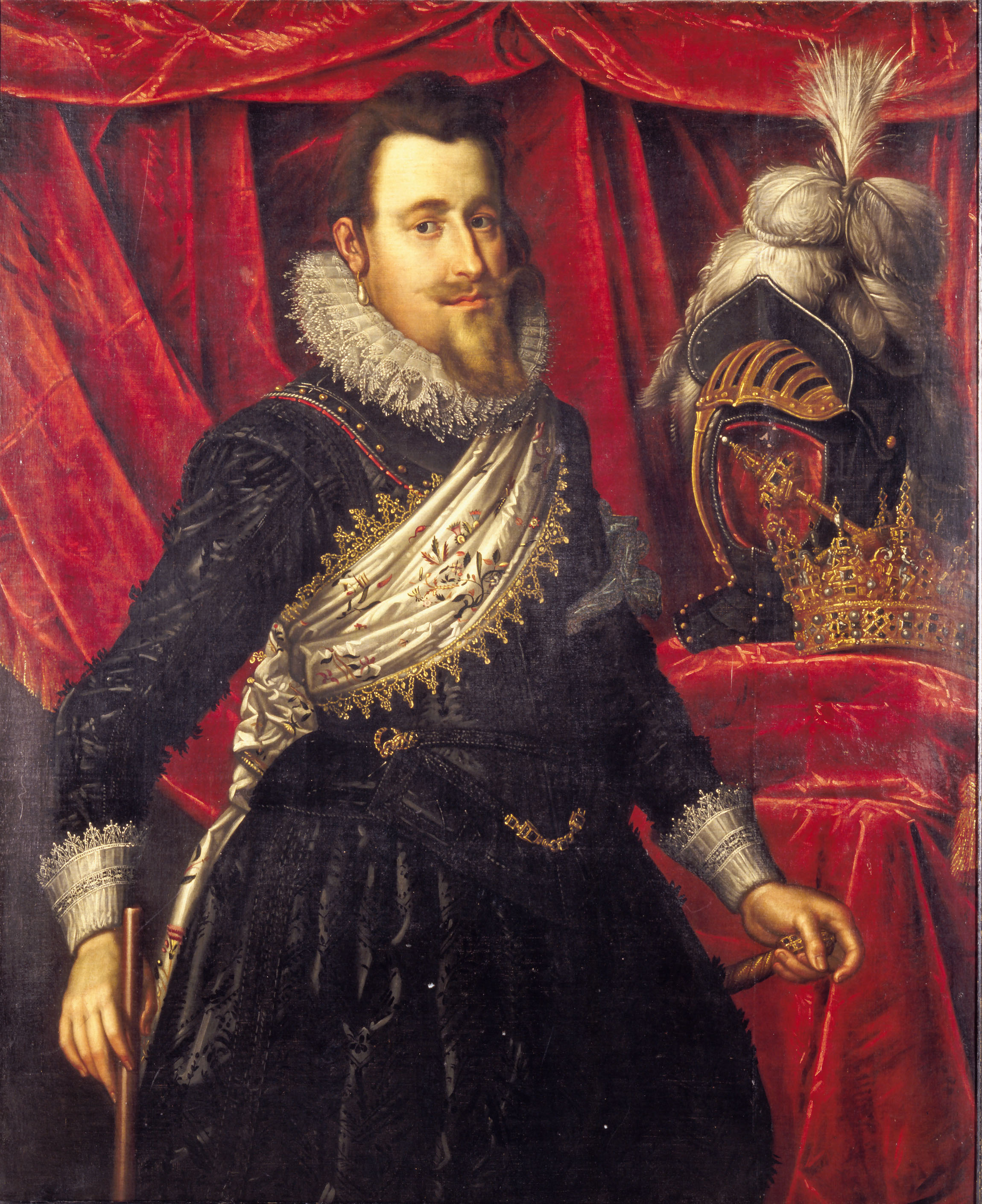
Christian IV of Denmark–Norway

Because of Denmark–Norway's dominion over the Baltic Sea (dominium maris baltici) and the North Sea, Sweden had the intention of avoiding paying Denmark's Sound Toll. Swedish king Charles IX's way of accomplishing this was to try to set up a new trade route through Lapland and northern Norway. In 1607 Charles IX declared himself "King of the Lapps in Nordland" and started collecting taxes in Norwegian territory.

Denmark–Norway and King Christian IV protested against the Swedish actions, as they had no intentions of letting another independent trade route open; Christian IV also had an intent of forcing Sweden to rejoin its union with Denmark–Norway. In 1611 Denmark–Norway finally invaded Sweden with 6,000 men and took the city of Kalmar. On 20 January 1613, the Treaty of Knäred was signed, in which Norway's land route from Sweden was regained by incorporating Lapland into Norway, and Swedish payment of the Älvsborg Ransom for two fortresses which Denmark–Norway had taken in the war. However, Sweden achieved an exemption from the Sound Toll.

==== Aftermath of the Älvsborg Ransom ====
The great ransom paid by Sweden (called the Älvsborg Ransom) was used by Christian IV, among many other things, to found the cities of Glückstadt, Christiania (refounded after a fire), Christianshavn, Christianstad and Christianssand. He also founded the Danish East India Company, which led to the establishment of numerous Danish colonies in India. The remainder of the money was added to Christian's already massive personal treasury.

=== Thirty Years' War ===
Not long after the Kalmar war, Denmark–Norway became involved in another greater war, in which they fought together with the mainly north German and other Protestant states against the Catholic states led by German Catholic League.

The recent defeat of the Protestant League in both the Palatinate and Bohemian Campaigns, the Protestant nations of the Dutch Republic, England, and the Lower Saxon Circle, along with France, the latter of which aiming to weaken the Habsburgs, promised to fund Denmark–Norway's operations if Christian IV decided to intervene on behalf of the Protestants. With the money provided by the aforementioned states, along with his own personal fortune, Christian could hire a large army of mercenaries.

Christian IV long sought to become the leader of the north German Lutheran states. He also had interests in gaining ecclesiastical posts in Northern Germany, such as the Prince-Bishopric of Verden. However, during the Battle of Lutter in 1626, Denmark–Norway faced a crushing defeat. This led to most of the German Protestant states ceasing their support for Christian IV. After another defeat at the Battle of Wolgast and following the Treaty of Lübeck in 1629, which forbade Denmark–Norway from future intervening in German affairs, Denmark–Norways's participation in the war came to an end.

==== Torstenson War ====
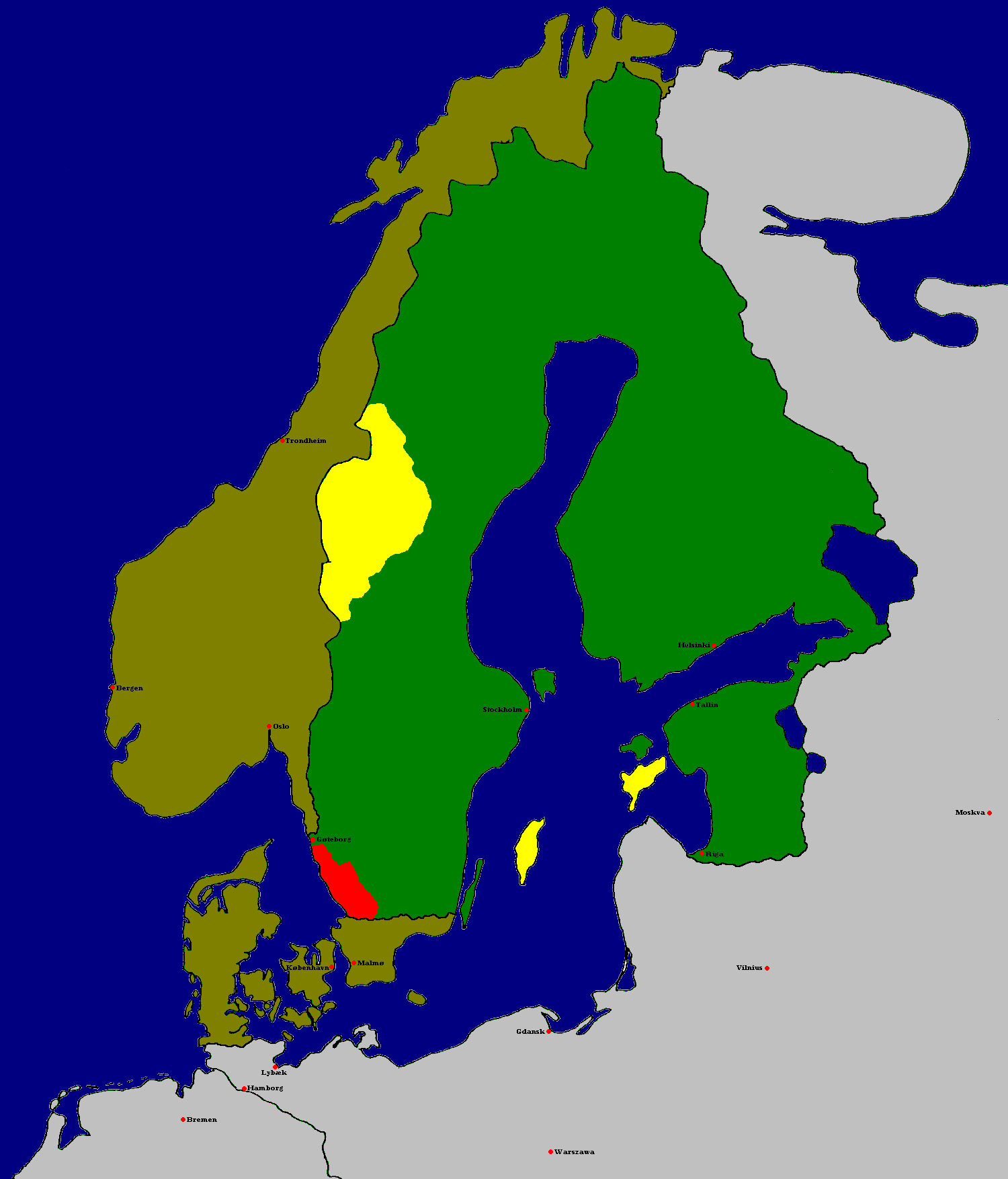
The Treaty of Brömsebro, 1645: Denmark–Norway Sweden The provinces of Jemtland, Herjedalen, Idre & Serna and the Baltic Sea islands of Gotland and Ösel, which were ceded to Sweden The province of Halland, ceded for 30 years

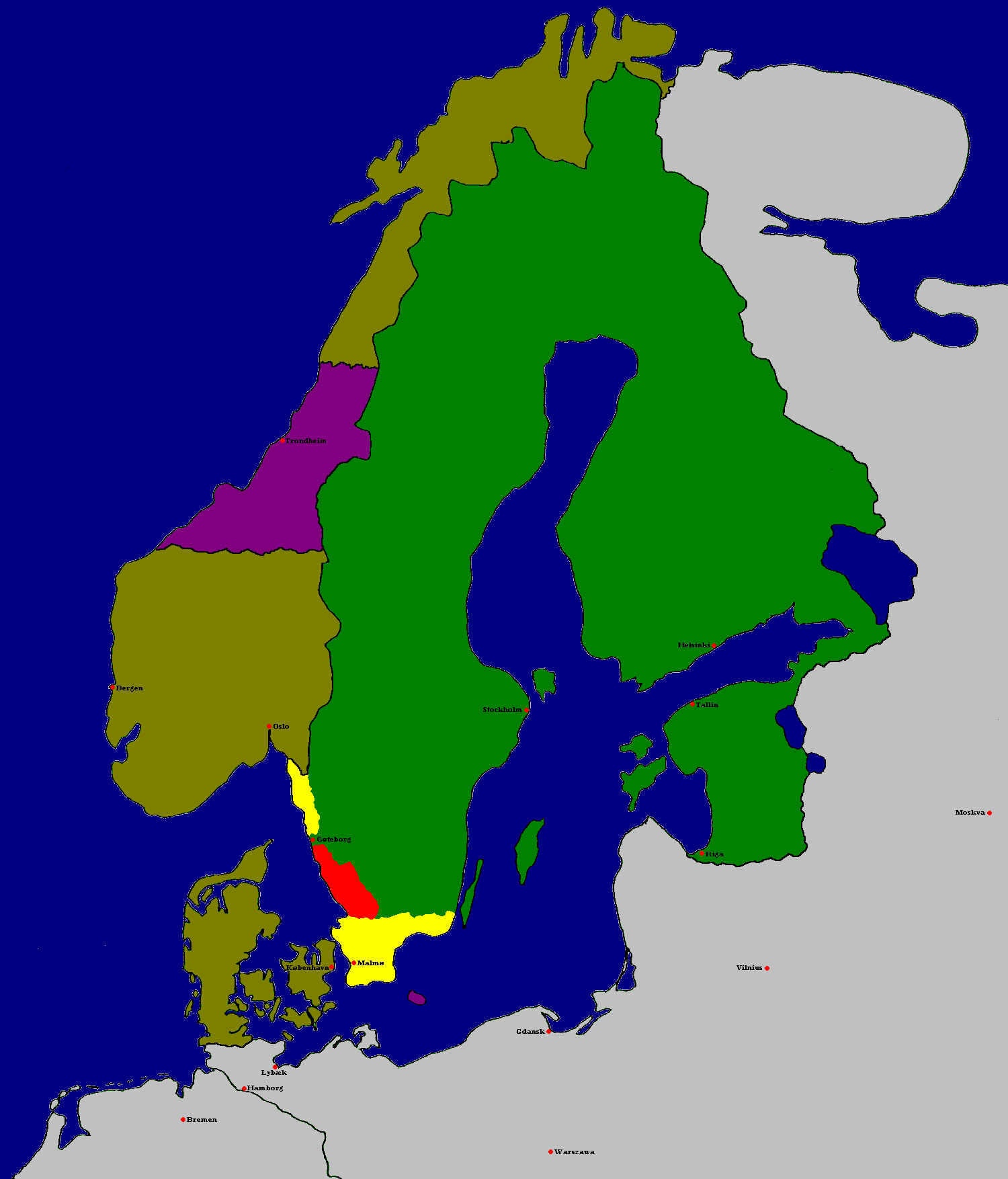
The Treaty of Roskilde, 1658: Halland, occupied by Sweden for a 30-year period under the terms of the Peace of Brömsebro negotiated in 1645, was now ceded. The Scanian lands and Båhus County were ceded. Trøndelag and Bornholm provinces, which were ceded in 1658, but which rebelled against Sweden and returned to Danish–Norwegian rule in 1660

Sweden was very successful during the Thirty Years' War, while Denmark–Norway failed to make gains. Sweden saw an opportunity of a change of power in the region. Denmark–Norway had territory surrounding Sweden which appeared threatening, and the Sound Dues were a continuing irritation for the Swedes. In 1643 the Swedish Privy Council determined that the chances of a gain in territory for Sweden in an eventual war against Denmark–Norway would be good. Not long after this, Sweden invaded Denmark–Norway.

Sweden was bolstered by the country's success during the Thirty Years' War, and was allied with the Netherlands, provoked by Danish tax policies.This gave Sweden a more solid foundation during the war than Denmark-Norway.

The war ended as foreseen with a Swedish victory, and with the Treaty of Brömsebro in 1645, Denmark–Norway had to cede some of their territories, including Norwegian territories Jemtland, Herjedalen and Idre & Serna, and the Danish Baltic Sea islands of Gotland and Ösel. Thus the Thirty Years' War facilitated rise of Sweden as a great power, while it marked the start of decline for Denmark–Norway.

=== Second Northern Wars ===
The Dano-Swedish War (1657–1658), a part of the Second Northern War, was one of the most devastating wars for the Dano-Norwegian kingdoms. After a huge loss in the war, Denmark–Norway was forced in the Treaty of Roskilde to give Sweden a quarter of its territory. This included Norwegian province of Trøndelag and Båhuslen, all remaining Danish provinces on the Swedish mainland, and the island of Bornholm.

However, two years later, in 1660, there was a follow-up treaty, the Treaty of Copenhagen, which gave Trøndelag and Bornholm back to Denmark–Norway.

=== Royal absolutist state ===
Over the course of the sixteenth and seventeenth centuries, the Rigsraad (High Council) of Denmark became weak. In 1660, it was abolished (the Norwegian Riksråd had not met since Denmark annexed Norway in 1537).

During the royal absolutist state era, Norway kept its separate laws and some institutions, such as a royal Chancellor, and separate coinage and army. Norway also had its own royal standard flag until 1748, after that the Dannebrog became the only official merchant flag in the union. Denmark–Norway became an absolutist state and Denmark a hereditary monarchy, as Norway de jure had been since 1537. These changes were confirmed in the Leges regiae signed on 14 November 1665, stipulating that all power lay in the hands of the king, who was only responsible to God.

In Denmark, the kings also began stripping rights from the Danish nobility. The Danish and Norwegian nobility saw a population decline during the 1500s, which allowed the Crown to seize more land for itself. The growing wealth of the Danish–Norwegian kings due to the Oresund allowed them fight wars without consent from the nobility and Danish Rigsraad, meaning that Danish–Norwegian kings slowly gained more and more absolute authority over time.

=== Scanian War ===
Denmark had lost its provinces in Scania after the Treaty of Roskilde and was always eager to retrieve them, but as Sweden had grown into a great power it would not be an easy task. However, Christian V saw an opportunity when Sweden got involved in the Franco-Dutch War, and after some hesitation Denmark–Norway invaded Sweden in 1675.

Although the Danish–Norwegian assault began as a great success, the Swedes led by 19-year-old Charles XI counter-attacked and took back the land that was being occupied. The war was concluded with the French dictating peace, with no permanent gains or losses to either of the countries.

=== French Revolutionary and Napoleonic Wars ===
The Battle of Copenhagen in 1801

During the French Revolutionary Wars, Denmark–Norway initially attempted to remain neutral and continue to trade with both France and Britain, though when it entered the Second League of Armed Neutrality the British considered this to be a hostile action and defeated a Danish fleet off Copenhagen in 1801. Six years later during the Napoleonic Wars, the British sent an expedition which besieged and occupied Copenhagen. Britain also captured most of the Dano-Norwegian navy, incorporating most of their prizes into the Royal Navy and destroying the rest. The Dano-Norwegian navy was caught unprepared for any military operation and the British found their ships still in dock after the winter season. The Dano-Norwegians were more concerned about preserving their continued neutrality and the entire Dano-Norwegian army was therefore gathered at Danevirke in the event of a French attack, leaving much of Denmark undefended. The British attack led the Dano-Norwegians into an alliance with France, although without a fleet they could do little.

==== The end of the Union ====
Denmark–Norway was defeated and King Frederick VI had to cede the Kingdom of Norway to the King Charles XIII of Sweden 14 January 1814 at the Treaty of Kiel, but Norway's overseas possessions were kept by Denmark. The Norwegians objected to the terms of this treaty, and a constitutional assembly declared Norwegian independence on 17 May 1814 and elected the Crown Prince Christian Frederik as king of independent Norway. Following a Swedish invasion, Norway was forced to accept a personal union between Sweden and Norway, but retained its liberal constitution and separate institutions, except for the foreign service. The union was dissolved in 1905.

== Culture ==
=== Differences between Denmark and Norway ===
After 1660, Denmark–Norway consisted of five formally separate parts (the Kingdom of Denmark, the Kingdom of Norway, the Duchy of Holstein, the Duchy of Schleswig and the County of Oldenburg (Note: Danish kings ruled the county, in a personal union from 1667–1773)). Norway had its separate laws and some institutions, and separate coinage and army. Culturally and politically, Denmark became dominant. While Denmark remained a largely agricultural society, Norway was industrialized from the 16th century and had a highly export-driven economy; Norway's shipping, timber and mining industries made Norway "the developed and industrialized part of Denmark–Norway" and an economic equal of Denmark.

Denmark and Norway complemented each other and had a significant internal trade, with Norway relying on Danish agricultural products and Denmark relying on Norway's timber and metals. Norway was also the more egalitarian part of the twin kingdoms; in Norway, the King (i.e., the state) owned much of the land, while Denmark was dominated by large noble landowners. Denmark had a serfdom-like institution known as Stavnsbånd which restricted men to the estates they were born on; all farmers in Norway, on the other hand, were free, could settle anywhere, and were on average more affluent than Danish farmers. For many Danish people who had the possibility to leave Denmark proper, such as merchants and civil servants, Norway was seen as an attractive country of opportunities. The same was the case for the Norwegians, and many Norwegians migrated to Denmark, like the famous author Ludvig Holberg.

=== Languages ===
- Danish – officially recognized, dominant language, used by most of the unions' nobility, was also the church language in Denmark, Norway, Greenland, the Faroe Islands, and parts of Schleswig.
- High German – officially recognized, used by a minority of the nobility, and the church language in Holstein and parts of Schleswig.
- Low German – not officially recognized, the main spoken language in Holstein and parts of Schleswig. Spoken to some degree mostly by Hanseatic traders In Bergen.
- Latin – commonly used in foreign relations, and popular as a second language among some of the nobility.
- Norwegian – not officially recognized, mostly used as a spoken language in Norway.
- Icelandic – recognized as a church language in Iceland after the Reformation, used as a spoken and written language in Iceland.
- Faroese – not officially recognized, mostly used as a spoken language on the Faroe Islands.
- Sámi languages – not officially recognized, spoken by Sami people in Norway.
- Finnish language - not officially recognized, spoken by Kvens and Forest Finns in Norway.
- Greenlandic – not officially recognized, spoken by Greenlandic Inuit.
- North Frisian – not officially recognized, mostly used as a spoken language in some parts of Schleswig.

=== Religion ===
Protestantism had been a religious movement in Denmark ever since the reign of Christian II. Though the country remained Catholic during the reign of Frederick I, and in Norway it was not a big movement at that time. But the victory in the Count's Feud secured Denmark under the Protestant King Christian III, and in 1537 he also secured Norway, creating the union between the two kingdoms.

In the following years, Denmark–Norway was among the countries to follow Martin Luther after the Protestant Reformation, and thus established Lutheran Protestantism as official religion in place of Roman Catholicism. Lutheran Protestantism prevailed through the union's life span. The Church of Denmark and the Church of Norway was founded during this time as well. The introduction of Lutheranism in Denmark–Norway was also a political move. Due to the creation of state churches, the king had the authority to seize church properties, levy his own church tithes, and stop paying taxes to the Papacy. This helped in Denmark–Norway's absolutism and increased the wealth of its kings.

There was one other religious "reformation" in the kingdoms during the rule of Christian VI, a follower of Pietism. The period from 1735 until his death in 1746 has been nicknamed "the State Pietism", as new laws and regulations were established in favor of Pietism. Though Pietism did not last for a substantial time, numerous new small pietistic resurrections occurred over the next 200 years. In the end, Pietism was never firmly established as a lasting religious grouping, but policies enacted by the "pietist king" affects citizens of Denmark, Norway and Iceland to this day, like the Holiday Peace Act.

== Legacy ==
Although the Dano–Norwegian union was generally viewed favourably in Denmark and Norway at the time of its dissolution in 1814, some 19th-century Norwegian writers disparaged the union as a "400-year night". Some modern historians describe the idea of a "400-year night" as a myth that was created as a rhetorical device in the struggle against the Swedish–Norwegian union, inspired by 19th-century national-romanticist ideas.

Since the late 19th century the Danish–Norwegian union was increasingly viewed in a more nuanced and favourable light in Norway with a stronger focus on empirical research, and historians have highlighted that the Norwegian economy thrived and that Norway was one of the world's wealthiest countries during the entire period of union with Denmark. Historians have also pointed out that Norway was a separate state, with its own army, legal system and other institutions, with significant autonomy in its internal affairs, and that it was primarily governed by a local elite of civil servants who identified as Norwegian, albeit in the name of the "Danish" King. Norwegians were also well represented in the military, civil service and business elites of Denmark–Norway, and in the administration of the colonies in the Caribbean and elsewhere. Norway benefited militarily from the combined strength of Denmark and Norway in the wars with Sweden and economically from its trade relationship with Denmark, in which Norwegian industry enjoyed a legal monopoly in Denmark, while Denmark supplied Norway with agricultural products.

== See also ==
- Kingdom of Norway (1814)
- Military history of Denmark
- Military history of Norway
- Possessions of Norway
- Union between Sweden and Norway
- Dano-Norwegian language
