= Regna firmat pietas =

1588–1648 royal motto of Denmark and Norway

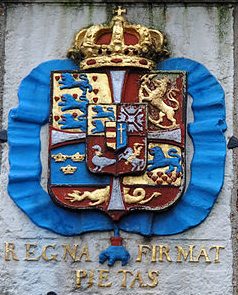
Coat of arms of Christian IV engraved at Flensburg (Flensborg) with the motto Regna firmat pietas.

Regna firmat pietas (Danish: Fromhed styrker rigerne, Low German: Die Gotts Fruchtigkeit machet veste Reiche, abbreviated to R.F.P.) is a Latin phrase translated in English as "Piety strengthens the realms". The phrase was used as the royal motto for Denmark–Norway during the reign of Christian IV and sought to promote Lutheranism as a strength for the nation.

King Christian used the phrase for the first time in 1584 when he was seven, and likely adopted it from his teacher, Hans Mikkelsen. The motto can be found in buildings and churches erected by King Christian in Denmark, Norway and Schleswig-Holstein. In Holmen Church, Copenhagen, where many Danish national heroes are buried, the motto stands visibly over the chapel's entrance, and it is also showcased with its initials R.F.P. on the Rundetaarn.

The motto was also showcased on coins during Christian IV's reign.

== See also ==
- Royal mottos of Danish monarchs

== Works cited ==
- Berg, Sigrun Høgetveit (2020). The Protracted Reformation in the North. Vol. III. Walter de Gruyter GmbH & Co KG. ISBN 978-3-11-068621-0.
- Thomson, M. Pearson (2020). Denmark. Good Press.
