= Truth prevails =

National motto of the Czech Republic

Standard of the president of the Czech Republic

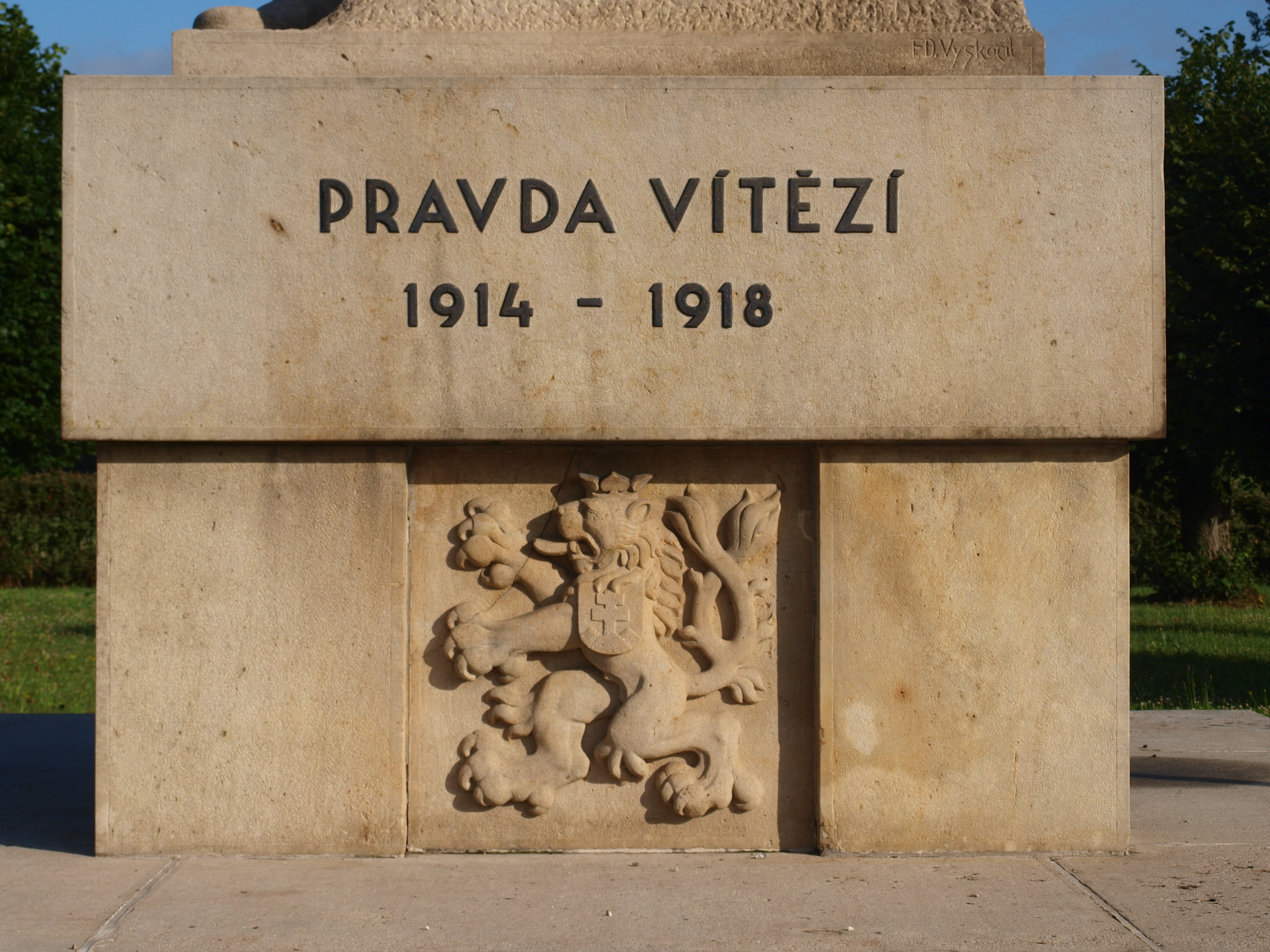

"Truth prevails" (Czech: Pravda vítězí) (Note: Slovak: Pravda víťazí; German: Die Wahrheit siegt; Hungarian: Az Igazság győzedelmeskedik; Latin: Veritas vincit.) is the national motto of the Czech Republic. The motto appears on the standard of the president of the Czech Republic, which the Czech Constitution designates a national symbol. Before the dissolution of Czechoslovakia in 1993, the motto was the motto of Czechoslovakia and appeared on the standard of the president of Czechoslovakia as well.

The motto was used during the First World War as a counter-motto to the war propaganda of Austria-Hungary and the Central Powers. The motto is believed to be derived from Jan Hus' phrase

Seek the truth, hear the truth, learn the truth, love the truth, speak the truth, hold the truth and defend the truth until death

— Jan Hus

The phrase thus appears along the base of the Jan Hus Memorial in Prague. Tomáš Garrigue Masaryk, the first President of Czechoslovakia, adopted the shortened phrase "truth prevails" as a presidential motto shortly after independence from Austria-Hungary in 1918. The sentiment was echoed over 75 years later in Václav Havel's notion of "life in truth" and in his famous statement "Truth and love must prevail over lies and hatred" (Czech: Pravda a láska musí zvítězit nad lží a nenávistí). The Latin version "Veritas vincit" was in use on the presidential banner from 1990 to 1992 as a linguistically neutral compromise reached between Czech and Slovak political representatives.

The concept of truth has a long tradition in Czech political thought. Jan Hus and John Amos Comenius had connected truth with theological aspects, while in Masaryk's ethical concepts truth was seen as the opposite of lie. Hus' credo traditionally had been seen as testifying moral and spiritual, rather than physical and military strength. The Charter 77 movement had the motto "Truth prevails for those who live in truth".

== Other uses ==
- Part of this motto is used as the tagline for the English version of the manga and anime series Case Closed ("One Truth Prevails").
- Motto on the crest of Clan Keith of Scotland
- Title of a song by the Slovak rock band, Tublatanka

== See also ==
- Satyameva Jayate, the national motto of India that has the same meaning.
