= Alt for Norge =

Royal motto of the Norwegian monarch

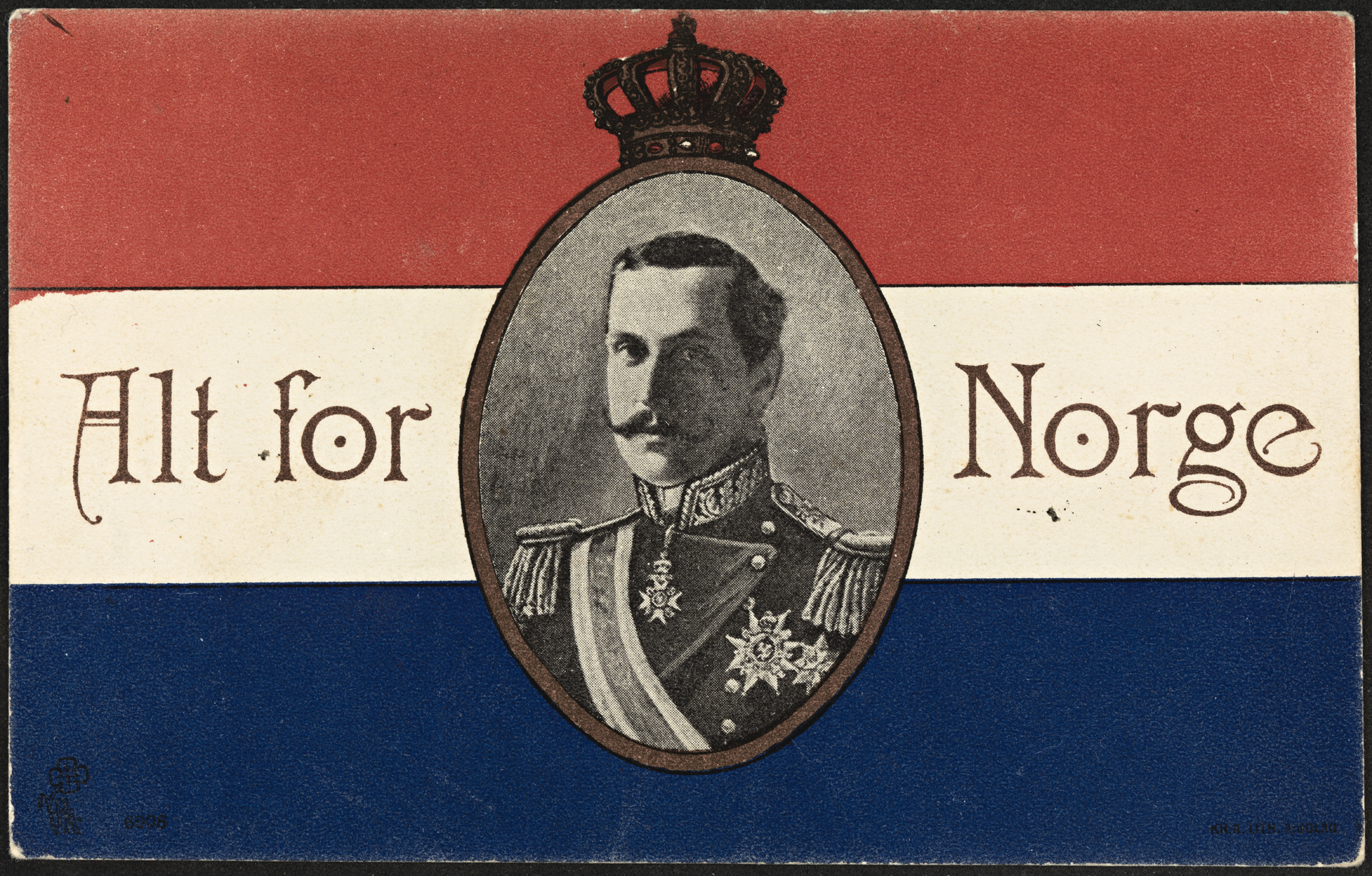
Postcard depicting a portrait of King Haakon VII with the motto Alt for Norge and the colours of the Norwegian flag

Alt for Norge (lit. 'everything for Norway' or 'all for Norway') is a Norwegian royal motto. It has been adopted by all monarchs of Norway since Haakon VII, who took the motto on his election as king following the dissolution of the union between Norway and Sweden in 1905. The Norwegian royal house gives its English translation of the phrase as "We give our all for Norway".

== History ==
After his accession to the throne was approved in the 1905 Norwegian monarchy referendum, Haakon VII announced that he would adopt the phrase as his regnal motto in his first speech to the Storting.

Mit liv vil jeg hellige Norges vel, og det er min hustrus og mit inderlige ønske, at det folk, der har valgt os, vil enigt samarbeide og stræbe frem imod dette store maal, og med fuld fortrøstning kan jeg da som mit valgsprog tage: Alt for Norge.

[I shall devote my life to Norway's welfare, and it is the heartfelt wish of my wife and myself that the people who have chosen us will work together and strive towards this great goal; therefore, it is with full confidence that I can adopt as my motto: Everything for Norway.]

Alt for Norge gained prominence as a symbol of the Norwegian resistance movement during World War II, when Norway was occupied by Nazi Germany. The motto was invoked by King Haakon in a speech given from exile in the United Kingdom in 1940, and was used as a title by various resistance newspapers operating illegally from within the occupation.

On his accession to the throne in 1991, Harald V described the motto as "not a slogan in an election campaign, but an expression of a guiding principle whose strength is nourished by faith and conviction".
