= Royal mottos of Swedish monarchs =

The royal motto of the Swedish monarch is a Swedish royal tradition stemming from the early 16th century. All reigning monarchs of Sweden, beginning with Gustav I, have had their own mottos during their respective periods of reign. The Swedish royal motto in many ways is equivalent to a national motto. The tradition among Swedish monarchs, in common with the Danish and Norwegian monarchies, but different from that of most other modern European monarchies, is that the motto is not the same for one dynasty, but is personal to each monarch.

Historically the royal motto has been used in connection with the Swedish coat of arms, and until 30 June 2017 it could be seen in print on the 1 krona coin. The new generation of coins does not feature a motto.

Gustav III was the first king to have his motto only in Swedish. Up until Adolf Frederick, the motto for every regent had been in Latin and Swedish (or, as in the case of Gustav II Adolf, in Swedish and German). Due to the dissolution of the union between Norway and Sweden in 1905, Oscar II had to change his motto.

== List ==
Monarch	Reign	Royal motto (in Swedish)	English translation
House of Vasa
Gustav I	1521–1560	All makt är av Gud	All power is of God
Eric XIV	1560–1568	Gud giver åt vem Han vill	God gives to whom He wishes
John III	1568–1592	Gud vår beskyddare	God our protector
Sigismund	1592–1599	För rätten och folket	For the justice and the people
Charles IX	1599–1611	Gud min tröst	God my comfort
Gustav II Adolf	1611–1632	Med Gud och segrande vapen	With God and victorious arms
Christina	1632–1654	Visheten är rikets stöd	Wisdom is the support of the realm
House of Palatinate-Zweibrücken (Pfalz) – cadet branch of the House of Wittelsbach
Charles X Gustav	1654–1660	I Gud mitt öde – Han skall göra det	In God my destiny – He shall do it
Charles XI	1660–1697	Herren är vorden min beskyddare	The Lord is become my protector
Charles XII	1697–1718	Med Guds hjälp	With the help of God
Ulrika Eleonora	1718–1720	I Gud mitt hopp	In God my hope
House of Hesse
Frederick I	1720–1751	I Gud mitt hopp	In God my hope
House of Holstein-Gottorp – cadet branch of the House of Oldenburg
Adolf Frederick	1751–1771	Statens välfärd, min välfärd	The welfare of the state [is] my welfare
Gustav III	1771–1792	Fäderneslandet	The fatherland
Gustav IV Adolf	1792–1809	Gud och folket	God and the people
Charles XIII of Sweden, Charles II of Norway	1809–1818	Folkets väl min högsta lag	The welfare of the people [is] my highest law (Note: Compare with the motto of the U.S. state of Missouri (1821): "Let the welfare of the people be the supreme law". Originally from Cicero's De Legibus, Book III, Part III, Sub. VIII.)
House of Bernadotte
Charles XIV John of Sweden, Charles III John of Norway	1818–1844	Folkets kärlek min belöning	The love of the people [is] my reward
Oscar I	1844–1859	Rätt och sanning	Justice and truth
Charles XV of Sweden, Charles IV of Norway	1859–1872	Land skall med lag byggas	Lands [or the land] shall be built with law
Oscar II	1872–1905	Brödrafolkens väl	The welfare of the brother peoples
Oscar II	1905–1907	Sveriges väl	The welfare of Sweden
Gustaf V	1907–1950	Med folket för fosterlandet	With the people for the Fatherland
Gustaf VI Adolf	1950–1973	Plikten framför allt	Duty before all
Carl XVI Gustaf	1973–present	För Sverige – i tiden	For Sweden – with the Times

== See also ==
- List of Swedish monarchs
- Royal mottos of Danish monarchs
- Royal mottos of Norwegian monarchs
