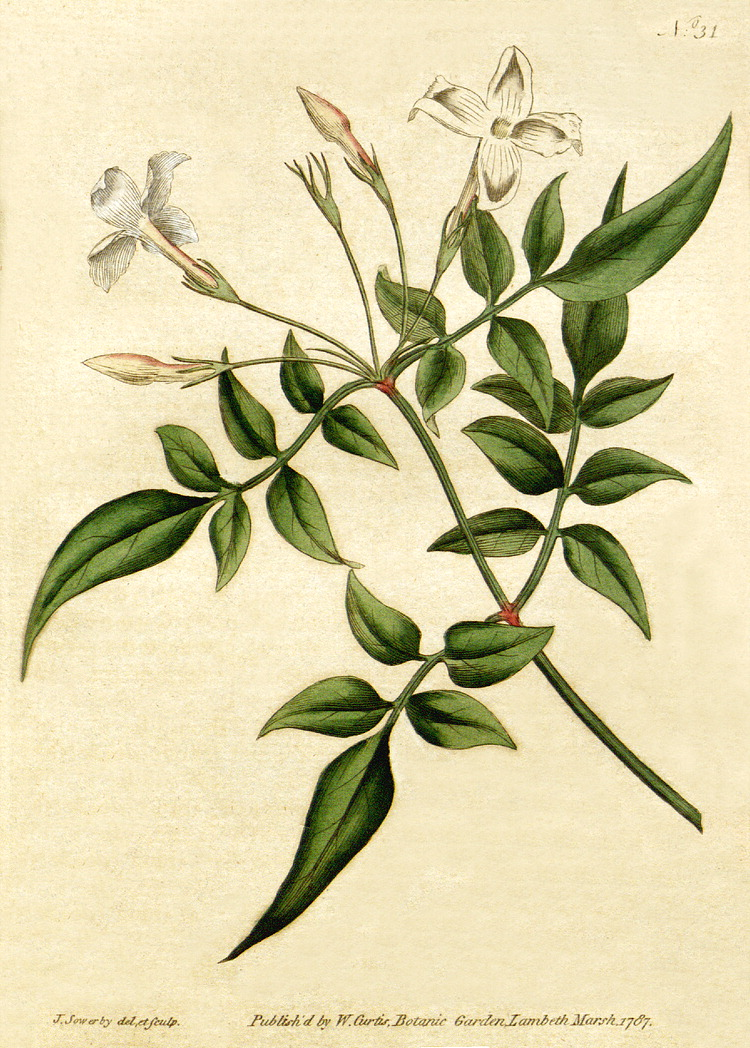
- Botanical illustration

Scientific classification
- Kingdom: Plantae
- Clade: Tracheophytes
- Clade: Angiosperms
- Clade: Eudicots
- Clade: Asterids
- Order: Lamiales
- Family: Oleaceae
- Genus: Jasminum
- Species: J. officinale

Binomial name
- Jasminum officinale L.

= Jasminum officinale =

Species of shrub

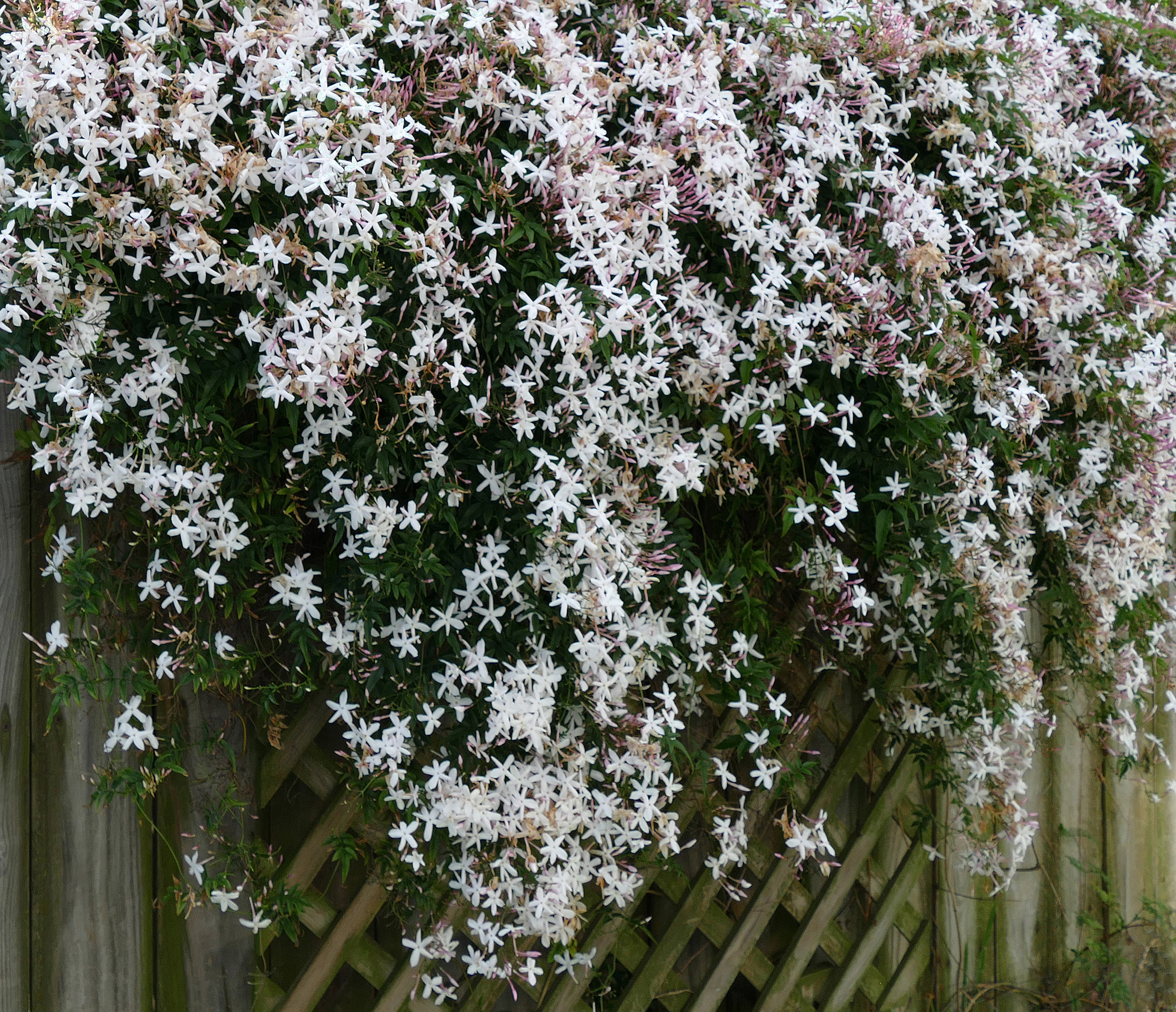

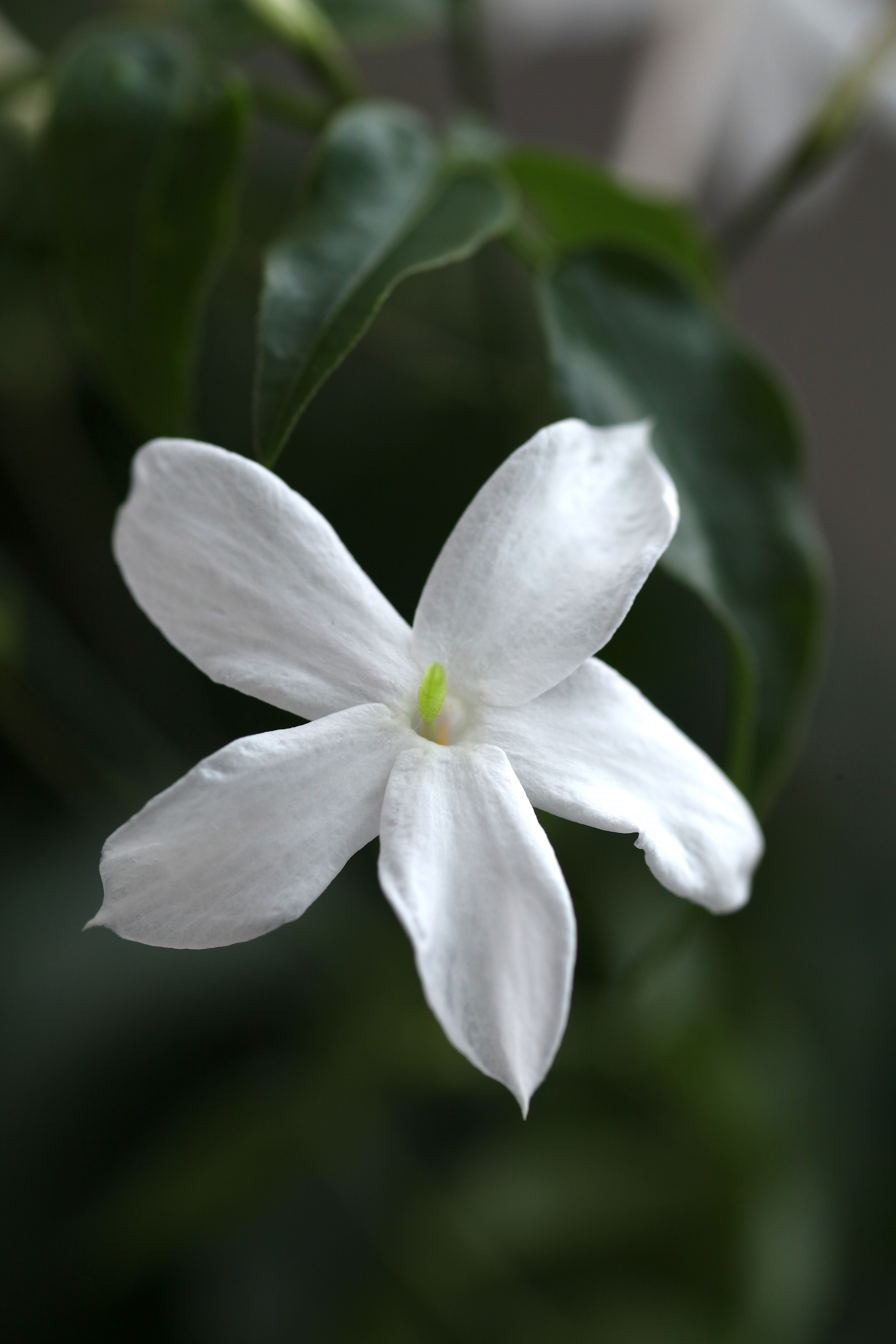

Floral wreath of jasmine representing the shield of Pakistan

Jasminum officinale, known as the common jasmine or simply jasmine, is a species of flowering plant in the olive family Oleaceae. It is native to the Caucasus and parts of Asia, also widely naturalized.

It is also known as summer jasmine, poet's jasmine, white jasmine, true jasmine or jessamine, and is particularly valued by gardeners throughout the temperate world for the intense fragrance of its flowers in summer. It is also the National flower of Pakistan.

== Description ==
Jasminum officinale is a vigorous, twining deciduous climber with sharply pointed pinnate leaves and clusters of starry, pure white flowers in summer, which are the source of its heady scent. The leaf has 5 to 9 leaflets.

== Etymology ==
The Latin specific epithet officinale means "useful".

== Distribution ==
It is found in the Caucasus, northern Iran, Afghanistan, Pakistan, the Himalayas, Tajikistan, India, Nepal and western China (Guizhou, Sichuan, Xizang (Tibet), Yunnan). The species is also widely cultivated in many places, and is reportedly naturalized in Spain, France, Italy, Portugal, Romania, Croatia, Bosnia and Herzegovina, Montenegro, Serbia, Algeria, Florida and the West Indies.

== Chemical composition ==
J. officinale has been found to contain alkaloids, coumarins, flavonoids, tannins, terpenoids, glycosides, emodine, leucoanthocyanins, steroids, anthocyanins, phlobatinins, essential oil and saponins.

== Garden history ==
Jasminum officinale is so ancient in cultivation that its country of origin, though somewhere in Central Asia, is not certain. H.L. Li, The Garden Flowers of China, notes that in the third century CE, jasmines identifiable as J. officinale and J. sambac were recorded among "foreign" plants in Chinese texts, and that in ninth-century Chinese texts J. officinale was said to come from Byzantium. Its Chinese name, Yeh-hsi-ming is a version of the Persian and Arabic name.

Its entry into European gardens was most likely through the Arab-Norman culture of Sicily, but, as the garden historian John Harvey has said, "surprisingly little is known, historically or archaeologically, of the cultural life of pre-Norman Sicily". In the mid-14th century the Florentine author Boccaccio in his Decameron describes a walled garden in which "the sides of the alleys were all, as it were, walled in with roses white and red and jasmine; insomuch that there was no part of the garden but one might walk there not merely in the morning but at high noon in grateful shade." Jasmine water also features in the story of Salabaetto in the Decameron. Jasminum officinale, "of the household office" where perfumes were distilled, was so thoroughly naturalized that Linnaeus thought it was native to Switzerland. As a garden plant in London it features in William Turner's Names of Herbes, 1548.

Double forms, here as among many flowers, were treasured in the 16th and 17th centuries.

== Cultivars ==
Numerous cultivars have been developed for garden use, often with variegated foliage. The cultivar 'Argenteovariegatum', with cream-white variegation on the leaves, has gained the Royal Horticultural Society's Award of Garden Merit.

== Aromatherapy ==
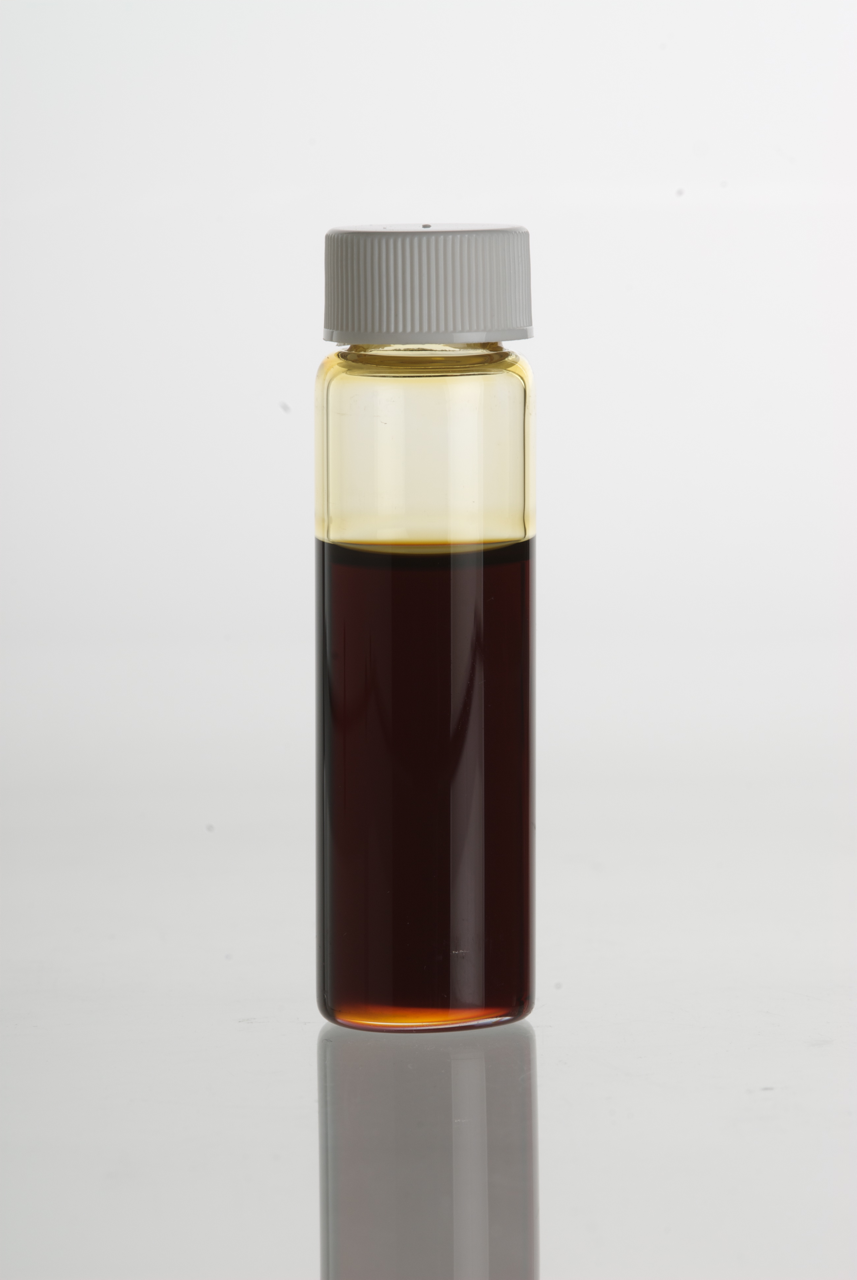
Essential oil

The essential oil of Jasminum officinale is used in aromatherapy. Jasmine absolute has a heavy, sweet scent valued by perfumers. The flowers release their perfume at dusk, so flowers are picked at night and a tiny amount of oil is obtained from each blossom by solvent extraction. The result is an expensive oil which can be used in low concentrations.

== Safety ==
Jasmine is "generally recognized as safe" (GRAS) as a food ingredient by the U.S. Food and Drug Administration.

It is unknown whether jasmine consumption affects breastmilk, as the safety and efficacy of jasmine in nursing mothers or infants has not been adequately studied. Drinking small amounts of jasmine tea likely are not harmful during nursing.

Allergic reactions to jasmine may occur.
