= Royal mottos of Norwegian monarchs =

The royal mottos (Norwegian: valgspråk/valspråk) of the Norwegian monarchs are an old tradition of Norway, permanent since the reign of Christian II of Denmark and Norway. All monarchs since the dissolution of the union between Norway and Sweden in 1905 have adopted the same motto as their personal motto, Alt for Norge, which has a particularly high standing as it became one of the main symbols of the Norwegian struggle during the German occupation in World War II.

== List ==
Monarch	Reign	Royal motto (in Norwegian)	English translation
Christian II	1513–1523	Så var det beskikket	Thus it was ordained
Frederick I	1524–1533	Mitt håp er Gud alene	My hope is God alone
Christian III	1537–1559	Skje Herrens vilje	The Lord's will be done
Frederick II	1559–1588	Intet uten Gud	Nothing without God
Christian IV	1588–1648	Fromhet styrker rikene	Piety strengthens the realms
Frederick III	1648–1670	Herren vil være mitt forsyn	The Lord will be my guide
Christian V	1670–1699	Med fromhet og rettferdighet	With piety and justice
Frederick IV	1699–1730	Herren er min hjelper	The Lord is my aid
Christian VI	1730–1746	For Gud og folket	For God and the people
Frederick V	1746–1766	Ved forsigtighet og bestandighet	By caution and consistency
Christian VII	1766–1808	Fedrelandets kjerlighet min berømmelse	The love of the fatherland my reward
Frederick VI	1808–1814	Gud og den rettferdige sak	God and the just cause
Christian Frederik	1814	Gud og fedrelandet	God and the fatherland
Karl II	1814–1818	Folkets vel min høyeste lov	The welfare of the people, my highest law (Note: Compare with the motto of the U.S. state of Missouri (1821): "Let the welfare of the people be the supreme law". Originally from Cicero's De Legibus, Book III, Part III, Sub. VIII.)
Karl III	1818–1844	Folkets kjærlighet min belønning	The love of the people, my reward
Oscar I	1844–1859	Rett og sannhet	Right and truth
Karl IV	1859–1872	Land skal med lov bygges	A country shall be built on law
Oscar II	1872–1905	Broderfolkenes vel	The good of the brother peoples
Haakon VII	1905–1957	Alt for Norge	All for Norway (Note: The present royal motto is not easily translated into English: the literal meaning is "All for Norway" but this conveys a sense of "Everything for Norway", as opposed to "Everybody for Norway" (since alt is neuter gender, and would rarely refer to people). As such, it conveys a meaning of "Give all for Norway", which is interpreted as the readiness (of the sovereign, but maybe also his subjects) to give up or sacrifice everything for Norway.)
Olav V	1957–1991	Alt for Norge	All for Norway
Harald V	1991–2026	Alt for Norge	All for Norway
Haakon VIII	2026–present	Alt for Norge	All for Norway

== See also ==
- List of Norwegian monarchs
- Royal mottos of Swedish monarchs
- Royal mottos of Danish monarchs
