= Royal mottos of Danish monarchs =

The use of a royal motto (Danish: valgsprog) is an old tradition among Danish monarchs, dating back at least 500 years. The use of such a motto was a way for a monarch of Denmark to emphasize values or beliefs they held dear. In earlier times, these mottos were often shown on Danish coinage, often in a Latin form.

== Before 1839 ==
Monarch	Reign	Royal motto (in Danish)	Latin or other version	English translation
Christian I	1448–1481	Dyden viser vejen	VIRTUTI MONSTRANTE VIAM	Virtue leads the way
Hans (John)	1481–1513	For lov og flok	PRO LEGE ET GREGE	For law and herd
Christian II	1513–1523	Så var det beskikket	SIC ERAT IN FATIS	Thus it was ordained
Frederick I	1523–1533	Intet uden Gud	NIHIL SINE NUMINE	Nothing without God
Christian III	1536–1559	Ske Herrens vilje	SPES MEA SOLUS DEUS Zu Gott mein Trost allein (in German)	The Lord's will be done
Frederick II	1559–1588	Mit håb er Gud alene	DEUS REFUGIU ET FIDUSIA MEA Mein Hofnung zu Godt allein (in German)	My hope is God alone
Christian IV	1588–1648	Fromhed styrker rigerne	REGNA FIRMAT PIETAS	Piety strengthens the realms
Frederick III	1648–1670	Herren være mit forsyn	DOMINUS PROVIDEBIT	The Lord will be my guide
Christian V	1670–1699	Med fromhed og retfærdighed	PIETATE ET IUSTITIA	With piety and justice
Frederick IV	1699–1730	Herren være min hjælper	DOMINUS MIHI ADIUTOR	The Lord be my helper
Christian VI	1730–1746	For Gud og folket	DEO ET POPULO	For God and the people
Frederick V	1746–1766	Med klogskab og standhaftighed	PRUDENTIA ET CONSTANTIA	By prudence and steadfastness
Christian VII	1766–1808	Fædrelandets kærlighed er min berømmelse	GLORIA EX AMORE PATRIÆ	The love of the fatherland is my reward
Frederick VI	1808–1839	Gud og den retfærdige sag	DEO ET JUSTAE CAUSAE	God and the just cause

== Since 1839 ==
Since the time of Christian VIII, Danish monarchs have only used mottos in the Danish language.

Monarch	Reign	Royal motto (in Danish)	English translation
Christian VIII	1839–1848	Gud og fædrelandet	God and the fatherland
Frederick VII	1848–1863	Folkets kærlighed, min styrke	The people's love, my strength
Christian IX	1863–1906	Med Gud for ære og ret	With God for honour and justice
Frederick VIII	1906–1912	Herren er min hjælper	The Lord is my helper
Christian X	1912–1947	Min Gud, mit land, min ære	My God, my country, my honour
Frederick IX	1947–1972	Med Gud for Danmark	With God for Denmark
Margrethe II	1972–2024	Guds hjælp, folkets kærlighed, Danmarks styrke	God's help, the people's love, Denmark's strength
Frederik X	2024–present	Forbundne, forpligtet, for Kongeriget Danmark	United, committed, for the Kingdom of Denmark

== See also ==
- List of Danish monarchs
- Royal mottos of Swedish monarchs
- Royal mottos of Norwegian monarchs
