= ACP =

ACP may refer to:

== Organizations ==
=== Medicine ===
- Albany College of Pharmacy, New York
- American College of Pathology, an association of diagnostic pathologists, physicians, and laboratory professionals, based in Houston, TX
- American College of Physicians, a national organization of internal medicine physicians in the US
- American College of Prosthodontists, dentistry
- American College of Psychiatrists, a US association of psychiatrists based in Chicago, Illinois
- Appalachian College of Pharmacy, Virginia, US
- Association of Cancer Physicians, a specialty association in the UK for medical oncologists
- Australian College of Pharmacy

=== Politics ===
- Aberdeen Central (Scottish Parliament constituency)
- Aberdeen Central (UK Parliament constituency)
- Aberdeenshire Central (UK Parliament constituency)
- A Coruña (Parliament of Galicia constituency)
- Active Citizen Project, a New York City-based non-profit organization founded in 2003
- African, Caribbean and Pacific Group of States
- Alliance for Climate Protection, a non-profit organization involved in education and advocacy related to climate change
- American College of Pediatricians, a socially conservative advocacy group of pediatricians and other healthcare professionals, Gainesville, FL
- American Communist Party (2024), a political party established in 2024
- Asociación Cívica de Potosí, a Nicaraguan political organization founded in 1996
- Australian Citizens Party, a political party in Australia previously known as Citizens Electoral Council
- A Connecticut Party (1990), a political party formed in 1990 in Connecticut, US

=== Publishing ===
- Academy Chicago Publishers
- Allied Communications Publications, documents developed by the Combined Communications-Electronics Board and NATO
- Are Media formerly ACP Magazines and Australian Consolidated Press
- Associated Construction Publications

=== Other organizations ===
- American Charities for Palestine, a non-profit organisation supporting the development of Palestinian education
- An Coimisiún Pleanála, Ireland, rules on planning matters
- Associated Collegiate Press, a national organization for college student media in the US
- Association of Chess Professionals, a non-profit organisation to protect the rights of professional chess players and promote chess worldwide
- Association of Chinese Professionals
- Atari Coldfire Project, a volunteer project that has created a modern Atari ST computer clone called the FireBee
- Audax Club Parisien, a cycling club

== Science ==
- Acampe, an orchid genus
- Accessory gland protein, a non-sperm component of semen
- Acepromazine, veterinary sedative
- Acetophenone, a chemical compound
- ACP1 (low molecular weight phosphotyrosine protein phosphatase), an enzyme encoded by the human ACP1 gene
- ACP2 (lysosomal acid phosphatase), an enzyme encoded by the human ACP2 gene
- ACP3 (Prostatic acid phosphatase), an enzyme produced by the prostate
- Acyl carrier protein, a component in both fatty acid and polyketide biosynthesis
- Anterior chamber paracentesis, a surgical procedure done to reduce intraocular pressure of the eye
- Asian citrus psyllid, or Diaphorina citri, a citrus pest and vector of citrus-greening disease
- Atmospheric Chemistry and Physics, scientific publication
- Autologous Conditioned Plasma, used for treatment of injuries
- Automatic and controlled processes, the two categories of cognitive processing

== Technology ==
- AC Propulsion, electric vehicle drive systems company
- IBM Airline Control Program, software operating system
- Algebra of Communicating Processes in mathematics
- Aluminium Composite Panel, building material
- Automatic Colt Pistol, designating several cartridges
- Average CPU power in computing
- Atomic commit protocol in computing
- Agentic commerce protocol of Stripe, Inc. in computing

== Other uses ==
- Address confidentiality program, for crime victims
- Advance care planning, for adults establishing their medical care policy in case they become incapacitated
- Advanced clinical practitioner, a UK term for mid-level practitioner
- Affordable Connectivity Program, for low-income households
- Airport Core Programme, Hong Kong
- Assistant Commissioner of Police, India and Hong Kong
- Attorney–client privilege, a common-law concept in the US
- Eastern Acipa language, a Kainji language of Nigeria

== See also ==
- American Computer and Peripheral, a defunct computer company
- ACPS (disambiguation)
