= List of mottos =

An example of a motto, Te mauri, te raoi ao te tabomoa (Health, peace and prosperity) on the Coat of arms of Kiribati

This list contains the mottos of organizations, institutions, municipalities and authorities.

== Organizations ==
=== National mottos ===
- List of national mottos

=== Cultural, philanthropic and scientific ===
- Amsterdam Zoo: Natura Artis Magistra (Nature is the teacher of art)
- International Expositions: Semper Verum (Always true)
- Monarchist League of Canada: Fidelitate Coniuncti (United by fealty)
- Real Academia Española (Royal Spanish Academy): Spanish: Limpia, fija y da Esplendor (Cleans, fixes and gives shine)
- Royal Society: Nullius in verba (On the word of no one)
- South African Museum: Semper aliquid novi Africa affert (Africa is always producing some novelty)
- Swedish Academy: Swedish: Snille och smak (Talent and taste)

=== Public service and youth service ===
- 4-H: "To make the best better."
- Air Training Corps: Venture, Adventure
- Army Cadet Force: To Inspire and achieve.
- Boy Scouts: Be Prepared
- Boys' Brigade: Sure and Stedfast (Old spelling)
- Brownies: Lend A Hand
- Civil Air Patrol: Semper Vigilans (Always vigilant)
- Cub Scouting Do Your Best
- Girlguiding UK: Be Prepared
- Girls' Brigade: Seek, serve and follow Christ
- Guides: Be Prepared
- National FFA Organization: Learning to Do, Doing to Learn, Earning to Live, Living to Serve
- New Zealand Air Training Corps: We Train to Serve
- St. John Ambulance: For the Faith and For the Service of Mankind

=== Police and public safety ===
- Carabineros de Chile: Order and Fatherland
- Chicago Police Department: We Serve and Protect
- Detroit Police Department: Making Detroit a Safer Place to Live, Work, and Visit
- Houston Police Department: Order through law, justice with mercy.
- Icelandic Police: Icelandic: Með lögum skal land byggja (With laws shall lands be built)
- Indonesian National Police: Sanskrit: Rastra Sewakottama (Serving the Nation)
- Los Angeles Airport Police: Serving the Aviation Community
- Los Angeles Police Department: To Protect and to Serve
- Maine State Police: Semper Aequus (Always just)
- Metropolitan Police Service: Working together for a safer London
- Milwaukee Police Department: Be A Force
- Minneapolis Police Department: To Protect with Courage, To Serve with Compassion
- Korean National Police Agency: Korean: 국민과 함께하는 따뜻하고 믿음직한 경찰 (A Friendly and Reliable Police Force for the People )
- New South Wales Police Force: Culpam Poena Premit Comes (Punishment Follows Closely On Guilt)
- New York Police Department: Fidelis ad Mortem (Faithful unto death)
- Royal Malaysian Police: Malay: Tegas, Adil dan Berhemah (Firm, Fair & Prudent)
- Sacramento County Sheriff: Service with Concern
- Singapore Police Force: Malay: Setia dan Bakti (Loyalty and Service)
- New Zealand Police: Safer communities together
- Thames Valley Police: Sit pax in valle tamesis (Let there be peace in the Thames Valley)
- Trinity House: Trinitas in unitate (Trinity in unity)
- United States Department of Veterans Affairs Police: Protecting Those Who Serve
- Victoria Police: Uphold the Right
- Royal Canadian Mounted Police: Maintiens le Droit (Uphold the right)

=== Sport and competition ===
==== International organisations ====
- Fédération Internationale des Échecs: Gens una sumus (We are one people)
- International Practical Shooting Confederation: Diligentia, Vis, Celeritas (Accuracy, power, speed)
- Olympic Games: Citius, Altius, Fortius - Communiter (Faster, higher, stronger - Together)
- Paralympic Games: Spirit in Motion

==== Africa and Asia ====
- Al-Quwa Al-Jawiya: Arabic: الخلق، الأيمان، القوة (Character, Faith, Force)
- Asante Kotoko S.C.: Ashanti Twi: Kum apem a, apem beba (Kill a thousand, and a thousand more will come)
- Kolkata Knight Riders: Korbo, Lorbo, Jeetbo re (Will do, will fight, will win)

==== Americas ====
- Carolina Panthers: Keep Pounding
- Chicago Fire SC: Tradition. Honor. Passion.
- Colo-Colo: Spanish: El equipo que ha sabido ser campeón (The team that has known to become champion)
- CR Flamengo: Uma vez Flamengo, sempre Flamengo (Once Flamengo, always Flamengo)
- Tabor Academy: Vincit Semper Veritas (Truth always conquers)

==== Australia ====
- Adelaide Football Club: Natus ad magna gerenda (Born to great things)
- Carlton Football Club: Mens sana in corpore sano (Sound Mind in a Healthy Body)
- Collingwood Football Club: Floreat pica (May the Magpie flourish)
- Essendon Football Club: Suaviter in Modo, Fortiter in Re (Gently in manner, resolutely in execution)
- Footscray Football Club: Cede Nullius (Yield to none)
- Hawthorn Football Club: Spectemur agendo (Judged by our actions)
- North Melbourne Football Club: Victoria amat curam (Victory demands dedication)
- Port Adelaide Football Club: We Are Port Adelaide
- St Kilda Football Club: Fortius quo fidelius (Strength through Loyalty)

==== Europe ====
- FC Barcelona: Catalan: Més que un club (More than a club) and Catalan: Tots units fem força (All together we are strong)
- Sport Lisboa e Benfica: E Pluribus Unum (Out of many, one)
- Feyenoord Rotterdam: Dutch: Geen woorden maar daden (No words but deeds)
- ADO Den Haag: Dutch Football Club: Alles Door Oefening (Everything Through Practice)
- SS Lazio: Concordia Parvae Res Crescunt (In harmony small things grew)
- Olympique de Marseille: Droit au but (Straight to the Goal)
- FC Porto: A Vencer desde 1893 (Conquering since 1893)
- Sporting Clube de Portugal: Esforço, Dedicação, Devoção, Glória (Effort, dedication, devotion, glory)
- Real Madrid CF: Spanish: Hala Madrid y nada mas (Hail Madrid and nothing more)

==== United Kingdom ====
- Arsenal F.C.: Victoria Concordia Crescit (Victory through harmony)
- Aston Villa F.C.: Prepared
- Blackburn Rovers F.C.: Arte et Labore (By skill and by hard work)
- Chelsea Football Club: Keep The Blue Flag Flying High
- Everton Football Club: Nil satis nisi optimum (Nothing but the best is good enough)
- Leeds United F.C.: Marching on Together
- Leicester City F.C.: Foxes Never Quit and #Fearless
- Llanelli Wanderers RFC: Welsh: Cyfeillach trwy Grwydro (Friendship through wandering)
- Liverpool Football Club: You'll Never Walk Alone
- Manchester City F.C.: Superbia in Proelio (Pride in battle)
- Norwich City F.C: On the Ball, City
- Queen's Park F.C.: Ludere Causa Ludendi (To play for the sake of playing)
- Rangers F.C.: Ready
- Sheffield Wednesday F.C.: Consilio et Animis (by Wisdom and Courage)
- Shrewsbury Town F.C: Floreat Salopia (May Shropshire flourish / Let Salop flourish)
- Stoke City: Vis Unita Fortior (United Strength is Stronger)
- Sunderland A.F.C.: Consectatio Excellentiae (In pursuit of excellence)
- Tottenham Hotspur F.C.: Audere est Facere (To dare is to do)

=== Politics ===
- Chechen Resistance: Ojal ya Marsho (Chechen: Freedom or death)
- Christian Democracy (Italy): Libertas
- Committees for the Defense of the Revolution (Cuba): ¡En cada barrio, Revolución! (Spanish: In every neighborhood, Revolution!)
- ETA: Bietan jarrai (Basque: Keep up on both)
- Industrial Workers of the World: An injury to one is an injury to all
- La Francophonie: égalité, complémentarité, solidarité (equality, complementarity, and solidarity).
- Liberal Party of the Philippines: Noon at Ngayon, Liberal Marangal (Past and present, honorable Liberal)
- Muslim Brotherhood: Allah Akbar, Wa Lellah Al Hamd (God is greater, thanks to God)
- Nacionalista Party: Ang Bayan Higit sa Lahat (The nation above all)
- Socialistisk Folkeparti: Det ku' være så godt (Danish: It could be so good)
- Universal Negro Improvement Association and African Communities League: One God! One Aim! One Destiny!
- Women's Institute: For Home and Country
- Women's Social and Political Union: Deeds not words
- Zapatista Army of National Liberation: Ya Basta! (Spanish: Enough already!)

=== Heritage and historical ===
- Daughters of the American Revolution: God, Home, and Country
- Sons of the American Revolution: Libertas et patria (Liberty and country)
- United Daughters of the Confederacy: Love, Live, Pray, Think, Dare

=== Religion ===
- Ahmadiyya Community: Love for All Hatred for None
- Benedictine Order: ora et labora (pray and work)
- Carmelite Order: zelo zelatus sum pro Domino Deo exercituum (I am aflame with zeal for the Lord God of Hosts)
- Cartellverband der katholischen deutschen Studentenverbindungen: In necessariis unitas, in dubiis libertas, in omnibus caritas (In need unity, in doubt liberty, in everything charity)
- Dominican Order: Veritas (Truth), Laudare, Benedicere, Praedicare (Praise, bless, preach)
- K.A.V. Lovania Leuven: Semper Excelsius (Always do your best); German: Der Geist lebt in uns allen (The Spirit lives in us all)
- Khuddam-ul Ahmadiyya: A Nation cannot be reformed without the reformation of its youth
- Knights Hospitaller: Tuitio Fidei et Obsequium Pauperum (Support the faithful and serve the poor)
- Knights Templar: Non nobis Domine, non nobis; sed Nomini tuo da gloriam (Not to us, Lord, not to us; but your name give glory)
- Lajna Imaillah: No nation can progress without educating their women
- Philippine Independent Church: Pro Deo Et Patria (For God and country)
- Pontificate of Pope Pius XII: opus iustitiae pax (peace is the fruit of justice)
- Pontificate of Pope Francis: Miserando Atque Eligendo (by having mercy and by choosing)
- Salvation Army: Blood and Fire
- Society of Jesus: Ad Majorem Dei Gloriam (For the greater glory of God)
- United Church of Christ: That they may all be one.
- United Methodist Church: Open hearts, Open minds, Open doors

=== Business ===
- ABUS Crane Systems: Moving On Up
- Audi: Vorsprung durch Technik (Literally: Advantage through technology, Figuratively: The technical edge)
- BBC: Nation Shall Speak Peace Unto Nation
- Harrods: Omnia Omnibus Ubique (All Things, For All People, Everywhere)
- IdentLogic Systems: Ille qui meritus est praemium habeat (Let him who has earned it bear the reward)
- Metro-Goldwyn-Mayer: Ars Gratia Artis (Art for art's sake)
- Royal Mail Lines: Per mare ubique (Everywhere by sea)

=== Medieval nobility ===
Famous mottos, usually deliberately cryptic, adopted during the age of chivalry and courtly love by great noblemen and ladies include:

- À Mon Seul Désir, appearing on The Lady and the Unicorn tapestry made in Paris circa 1500;
- Me Sovent Sovant, Lady Margaret Beaufort (1441/3-1509) (Souvent me souviens, "Often I remember") which was adopted by St John's College, Cambridge, founded by her;
- A Vous Entier John of Lancaster, 1st Duke of Bedford (1389–1435);
- Le Temps Venra Jean de Berry (1340–1416)
- Le Bon Temps Viendra, ("the right time will come") Bourchier family;
- Honi Soit Qui Mal Y Pense, King Edward III (ruled 1327–1377) of England, motto of the Order of the Garter (1348);
- J'en Garde un Leal, Anne Malet de Graville ((1490?–1540?))

=== Dynasties ===
- Belgian monarchy: French: L'Union Fait La Force (Union makes strength)
- British monarchy (Plantagenet): French: Dieu Et Mon Droit (God and my right / God and my right shall me defend)
- Dutch monarchy: French: Je Maintiendrai (I will maintain)
- Greek royal family : Greek: Ἰσχύς μου ἡ ἀγάπη τοῦ λαοῦ (People's love, my strength)
- Hohenzollern-Sigmaringen, House of Romania : Nihil Sine Deo (Nothing without God)
- Pahlavi dynasty : Persian: مرا داد فرمود و خود داور است (Justice He [God] bids me do, as He will judge me)
- Rothschild family: Concordia, Integritas, Industria (Unity, integrity, diligence)
- House of Savoy: FERT
- Spanish monarchy : Plus Ultra (Further beyond)
- Royal mottos of Danish monarchs
- List of Norwegian monarchs' mottos
- Royal mottos of Swedish monarchs

=== Medical ===
- American Board of Ophthalmology: Ex Obscuris Lux (From darkness, light)
- Association of Anaesthetists of Great Britain and Ireland: In somno securitas (In sleep there is safety)
- Association of Veterinary Surgeons in Bulgaria: Culter in manu sapienti vitam dat (A scalpel in a wise hand gives life)
- Association of Surgeons of Great Britain and Ireland: omnes ab omnibus discamus (Let us learn all things from everybody)
- Australian and New Zealand College of Anaesthetists: Corpus curare spiritumque (To care for the body and its breath of life)
- Australian College of Pharmacy: Education for Practice and Management
- Canadian Association of General Surgeons: Sapientia Manaque Apta (Wisdom and a skillful hand)
- Canadian Orthopaedic Association: Pietate, Arte et Scientia Corrigere (With compassion, skill and knowledge we correct, straighten or set right)
- Grant Medical College, Mumbai, India. Mens sana in corpora sano (Healthy mind in a healthy body)
- Royal Australasian College of Dental Surgeons: Vincat Scientia Morbos (Let knowledge conquer disease)
- Royal Australian and New Zealand College of Obstetricians and Gynaecologists: Excellence in women's health
- Royal College of Anaesthetists: Divinum sedare dolorem (It is divine to alleviate pain / Divine is the effort to conquer pain)
- Royal College of General Practitioners: Cum Scientia Caritas (Scientific knowledge applied with compassion)
- Royal College of Midwives: Vita donum Dei (Life is the gift of God)
- Royal College of Obstetricians and Gynaecologists: Super Ardua (Let us overcome our difficulties)
- Royal College of Ophthalmologists: Ut Omnes Videant (So that all may see)
- Royal College of Paediatrics and Child Health: Hereditas Domini filii (Children are a heritage from the Lord)
- Royal College of Psychiatrists: Let Wisdom Guide
- Royal College of Surgeons in Ireland: Consilio Manuque (Scholarship and dexterity)
- Royal Pharmaceutical Society: Habenda ratio valetudinis (We must pay attention to our health)
- Walter Reed Tropical Medicine Course: Safiri Salama (Swahili: Travel safely)
- ZAKA: Hessed Shel Emet (True kindness)

=== Other ===
- Association of Trust Schools: Ad Susceptum Perficiendum (In order to achieve what has been undertaken)
- Glasgow Filmmakers Alliance: Whatever the weather, we stand together
- International Thespian Society: Act well your part. There all the honor lies
- Linux Foundation: Open your source, Open your mind
- The Boondock Saints: Aequitas et Veritas, alternately Veritas et Aequitas (Truth and justice / Honesty and equality)
- The Red Green Show: Quando omni flunkus moritati (Pseudo-Latin When all else fails, play dead)

== Military and governmental ==
- Canadian Security Intelligence Service: A safe, secure and prosperous Canada, through trusted intelligence and advice.
- Canadian Army: Vigilamus pro te (We stand on guard for thee)
- Royal Canadian Air Force: Sic Itur ad Astra (Such is the pathway to the stars)
- Royal Canadian Navy: Parati vero parati (Ready aye ready)
- Canadian Special Operations Forces Command: Facta, non verba (Actions, not words)
- Irish Army Cavalry Corps: Through the mud and blood to the green fields beyond
- Apollo 13: Ex luna, scientia (From the Moon, knowledge)
- British Special Air Service: Who Dares Wins
- Indian Army: Naam, Namak, Nishan (Be honourable, true to your salt, and uphold the flag)
- Indian Army Medical Corps: Sarve Santu Niramaya (Everyone should remain healthy, good health for all)
- National Security Agency (NSA): Defending Our Nation, Securing The Future
- Ontario Regiment of Canada: Canadian Armed Forces Armoured Reserve Regiment: Fidelus Paradus (Faithful and prepared)
- Pakistan Army: Iman, Taqwa, Jihad Fi Sabil-illah, Men at their Best. (Faith, piety, struggle in the way of Almighty Allah, men at their best)
- Philippine National Police: We Serve and Protect
- Royal Air Force (United Kingdom): Per Ardua Ad Astra (Through adversity to the stars)
- Royal Marines (United Kingdom): Per Mare, Per Terram (By sea, by land)
- Household Division (United Kingdom): Septem Juncta in Uno (Seven joined in one)
- United States Air Force Academy: Integrity First, Service before self, Excellence in All we Do
- United States Coast Guard (USCG): Semper Paratus (Always ready)
- United States Coast Guard Life-Saving Service (USCG LSS): You have to go out, but you don't have to come back
- United States Marine Corps (USMC): Semper Fidelis (Always faithful)
- United States Military Academy: Duty, Honor, Country
- US Air Force Pararescue: That Others May Live
- United States Army: This We'll Defend
- Spanish Light Armoured Cavalry Regiment Santiago No 1 : Pes meus stetit in directo (My foot has stood in the right way/direction (or in uprightness; in integrity )
- United States Secret Service: Worthy of Trust and Confidence

=== Orders and decorations ===
==== Canada ====
- Order of Canada: Desiderantes Melioram Patriam (They desired a better land)
- Order of Military Merit (Canada): Officio ante Commodum (Service before self)

==== Europe ====
- Legion of Honour (France): French: Honneur et Patrie (Honour and Fatherland)
- Order of Charles III (Spain): Virtuti et Merito (By virtue and merit)
- Order of the Crown (Belgium): French: Travail et Progrès (Work and Progress)
- Order of the Cross of Liberty (Finland): Finnish: Isänmaan Puolesta (For the Fatherland)
- Order of the Dannebrog (Denmark): Danish: Gud og Kongen (God and the King)
- Order of the Elephant (Denmark): Magnanimi Pretium (The prize of greatness)
- Order of the Golden Fleece (Spanish version): Ante ferit quam flamma micet (Strike before they see the flame)
- Order of the House of Orange (Netherlands): French: Je Maintiendrai (I will maintain)
- Order of Leopold (Belgium): French: L'Union Fait La Force (Union makes strength)
- Order of Leopold II (Belgium): French: L'Union Fait La Force (Union makes strength)
- Order of Merit for the Fatherland (Russia): Polza, chest i slava (Benefit, honour and glory)
- Order of the Netherlands Lion: Virtus Nobilitat (Power ennobles)
- Order of Orange-Nassau: French: Je Maintiendrai (I will maintain)
- Order of the Polar Star (Sweden): Nescit Occasum (It knows no decline)
- Order of Saint Andrew (Russia): Za Veru i Vernost (For faith and loyalty)
- Order of St. George (Russia): Za Sluzhbu i Khrabrost (For service and bravery)
- Order of St. Olav (Norway): Norwegian: Ret og Sandhed (Justice and truth)
- Order of the Seraphim (Sweden): Iesus Hominum Salvator (Jesus, saviour of men)
- Order of the Star of Romania: In Fide Salus (In Faith is the Salvation)
- Order of the Sword (Sweden): Pro Patria (For Fatherland)
- Order of the Tower and Sword (Portugal): Valor, Lealdade e Mérito (Valour, Loyalty and Merit)
- Order of the White Eagle (Poland): Polish: Za Ojczyznę i Naród (For Fatherland and Nation)
- Order of the White Lion (Czech Republic): Czech: Pravda Vítězí (Truth Prevails)
- Order of the White Rose of Finland: Finnish: Isänmaan hyväksi (For the Well-Being of the Fatherland)

==== Holy See ====
- Order of Pius IX: Virtuti et Merito (By virtue and merit)
- Order of St. Gregory the Great: Pro Deo et Principe (For God and Prince)
- Order of St. Sylvester: Multum in Parvo (Much in a small space)

==== United Kingdom ====
- George Cross: For Gallantry
- Order of the Bath: Tria Juncta In Uno (Three joined in one)
- Order of the British Empire: For God and the Empire
- Order of the Garter: French: Honi Soit Qui Mal Y Pense (Shame be to him who thinks evil of it)
- Order of Merit: For Merit
- Order of St Michael and St George: Auspicium Melioris Aevi (Hope of a better age)
- Order of the Thistle: Nemo Me Impune Lacessit (No-one injures me with impunity)
- Royal Victorian Order: Victoria
- Victoria Cross: For Valour

== Municipalities ==
=== Australia ===
==== New South Wales ====
- Blacktown: Progress
- Sydney: I take but I surrender

==== Northern Territory ====
- Darwin, Northern Territory: Progrediamur (Let us go forward)

==== Queensland ====
- Brisbane: Meliora sequimur (We aim for better things)

==== South Australia ====
- Adelaide: Ut Prosint Omnibus Conjuncti (United for the common good)

==== Tasmania ====
- Hobart: Sic Fortis Hobartia Crevit (Thus, in force, Hobart grew)

==== Victoria ====
- Melbourne: Vires Acquirit Eundo (She acquires strength as she goes)

==== Western Australia ====
- City of Perth: Floreat (Prosper & Protect)

=== Canada ===
==== British Columbia ====
- Kamloops Salus et Opes (Health and abundance)

==== Manitoba ====
- Brandon: Vires Acquirit Eundo (She acquires strength through progress)
- Headingley: Progredi Prospere (To go forward prosperously)
- Macdonald: Preserverate et Florete (To preserve and flourish)
- Portage la Prairie: English: Progress
- St. Andrews: English: In Union Is Strength
- West St. Paul: English: Onward
- Winnipeg: Unum Cum Virtute Multorum (One with the strength of many)

==== New Brunswick ====
- Saint John: O Fortunati Quorum Jam Moenia Surgunt (O fortunate ones whose walls are now rising / O happy they, whose promised walls already rise)

==== Nova Scotia ====
- Halifax: E Mari Merces (Wealth from the sea)

Alberta

- Calgary: Onward

==== Ontario ====
- Hamilton: Together Aspire, Together Achieve
- Ottawa: Advance Ottawa
- Toronto: Diversity Our Strength
- Sarnia: Sarnia Semper (Sarnia Always)

==== Quebec ====
- Montreal: Concordia Salus (Salvation through harmony)
- Province of Quebec: French: Je me souviens (I remember)
- Quebec City, Quebec: French: Don de Dieu feray valoir (I shall put God's gift to good use)

==== Saskatchewan ====
- Regina: Floreat Regina (Let Regina flourish)

=== Europe ===
- Amsterdam: Dutch: Heldhaftig, Vastberaden, Barmhartig (Valiant, Steadfast, Compassionate)
- Bordeaux: Lilia sola regunt lunam undas castra leonem (The fleur-de-lis alone rules over the moon, the waves, the castle, and the lion)
- Brescia: Brixia fidelis (Brescia faithful)
- Bruges: S.P.Q.B.
- Bucharest: Romanian: Patria și Dreptul Meu (The Homeland and my right)
- Douglas: Manx: Kiannoortys cheusthie jeh Kiannoortys (Government within a government)
- Frankfurt: German: Stark im Recht (Strong in justice)
- Gdańsk: Nec temere, nec timide (Neither rashly nor timidly)
- Gdynia: Polish: Gdynia—miasto z morza i marzeń (Gdynia—a city built of sea and dreams)
- Genoa: Libertas (Liberty)
- Kaunas: Diligite justitiam qui judicatis terram (Love justice, landlords)
- Łódź: Ex navicula navis (Big boat out of a small one)
- Madrid: Spanish: Fui sobre agua edificada, mis muros de fuego son. Esta es mi insignia y blasón (On water I was built, My walls are made of fire, this is my ensign and escutcheon)
- Marseille: Actibus immensis urbs fulget Massiliensis (By her great deeds, Marseille shines in the world)
- Nancy, France: Non inultus premor (I'm not touched with impunity)
- Nantes: Favet Neptunus Eunti (Neptune favours the traveller)
- Nice: Nicaea Civitas (City of Nice)
- Oporto, Portugal: Antiga, mui nobre e sempre leal, Invicta cidade do Porto (Antique, highly noble, always faithful, unvanquished Oporto City)
- Paris: Fluctuat nec mergitur (Tossed by the waves, she does not founder)
- Prague: Praga caput rei publicae (Prague, head of the republic). Formerly: Praga caput regnum (Prague, head of the kingdom)
- Rotterdam: Dutch: Sterker door strijd (Stronger by struggle)
- Seville: Spanish: No me ha dejado (written NO8DO) (It [Seville] has not abandoned me)
- Sofia: Raste, no ne staree (Bulgarian: Grows, but does not age)
- The Hague: Dutch: Vrede en recht (Peace and Justice)
- Toulon: Concordia parva crescunt (Small things increase by concord)
- Toulouse: Occitan: Per Tolosa totjorn mai (For Toulouse, always more)
- Valletta: Italian: Città Umilissima (The most humble city)
- Vilnius: Unitas, Justitia, Spes (Unity, justice, hope)
- Warsaw: Contemnit procellas (It defies the storms), Semper invicta (Always invincible)
- Żebbuġ, Malta: Semper Virens (Evergreen)

=== Indonesia ===
- Jakarta: Jaya Raya (Victory and glorious)
- Bandung: Gemah Ripah Wibawa Mukti (rich soil, prosperous people)
  Rarasing Rasa Wiwaraning Praja, a Javanese sengkala, (referring to the year of 1966), people's harmonious feeling for entering a gate of prosperity
- Karawang: Pangkal Perjuangan (Struggle starting point)
- Bali: Bali Dwipa Jaya (Glorious Bali Island)
- Aceh : Pancacita (Five purposes)

=== India ===
- Kolkata (Calcutta): Purosree Bibardhan (Bengali: Progress of the city)
- Mumbai: Yato Dharmastato Jaya (यतो धर्मस्ततो जय) (Sanskrit: Where there is righteousness, there shall be victory). Pre-independence motto: Urbs Primis in Indis (India's first city)
- Kerala: Ever To Be The Best (Tolins World School)
- Tamil Nadu வாய்மையே வெல்லும் (Tamil) (Truth alone triumphs)

=== Republic of Ireland ===
- Cork: Statio Bene Fida Carinis (A safe harbour for ships)
- Dublin: Obedientia Civium Urbis Felicitas (Happy the city where citizens obey)
- Dún Laoghaire: Ó Chuan go Sliabh (From the harbour to the mountain)
- Limerick: Urbs Antiqua Fuit Studiisque Asperrima Belli (An ancient city well versed in the arts of war)
- Waterford: Urbs Intacta Manet Waterfordia (Waterford remains the untaken city)

=== Latin America ===
- Nuevo León, Mexico: Semper Ascendens (Always ascending)
- São Paulo: Non ducor, duco (I am not led, I lead)

=== New Zealand ===
- Auckland: Advance
- Christchurch: Fide Condita, Fructu Beata, Spe Fortis (Founded in Faith, Rich in the Fulfillment thereof, Strong in Hope for the Future).
- Dunedin: Maiorum Institutis Utendo (By following in the footsteps of our forefathers)
- Nelson, New Zealand: Palmam qui meruit ferat (Let him, who has earned it, bear the palm)
- Wellington: Suprema a Situ (Supreme by position)

=== United Kingdom ===
==== England ====
===== Berkshire =====
- Reading: A Deo et Regina (From God and the Queen)
- Slough: Serve with honour
- West Berkshire: Forward together
- Windsor and Maidenhead: In Unitate, Felicitas (In unity, happiness)
- Wokingham: Unum e Pluribus (One out of many)

===== Buckinghamshire =====
- Aylesbury Vale: Concordia prorsum (Forward in harmony)
- Chiltern: Freely we serve
- High Wycombe: Industria ditat (Industry enriches)
- Milton Keynes: By knowledge, design, and understanding
- South Buckinghamshire: Consillo et animis (By counsel and courage)

===== Cambridgeshire =====
- Huntingdonshire:Labore omnia florent (By labour everything prospers)
- Peterborough: Upon this rock
- South Cambridgeshire: Dutch: Niet zonder arbyt (Not without work)

===== Cheshire =====
- Chester: Antiqiui Colant Antiquum Dierum (Let the ancients worship the ancient of days)
- Borough of Halton: Industria Navem Implet (Industry fills the ship)
- Runcorn: Navem Mercibus Implere (Fill the ship with goods)
- Widnes: Industria Ditat (Industry enriches)

===== City of London =====
- Domine dirige nos (Lord direct us)

===== Devon =====
- Exeter: Semper Fidelis (Always faithful)
- Plymouth: Turris Fortissima est Nomen Jehova (The strongest tower is the name of Jehovah)
- Torquay: Salus et Felicitas (Health and happiness)

===== Essex =====
- Benfleet: Societas florebit (Fellowship will blossom)
- Braintree: By wisdom and foresight
- Brentwood: Ardens Fide (burning with faith)
- Canvey Island: Ex Mare Dei Gratia (From the sea by the grace of God)
- Chelmsford: Many minds, one heart
- Colchester: No Cross, no Crown
- Great Dunmow: May Dunmow prosper
- Halstead: Consilio et Prudentia (By wisdom and foresight)
- Harwich: Omnia Bona Bonis (To the good all things are good)
- Harlow: In Common Endeavour
- Leigh-on-Sea: Lux Salubritas Felicitas (Light, health, happiness)
- Maldon: Vision, courage, integrity
- Rayleigh: In Reliquom Laboramus (We work for the future)
- Rochford: Our heritage, our future
- Southend-on-Sea: Per Mare Per Ecclesiam (By the sea and by the church)
- Thurrock: Secundum Tamesim Quovis Gentium (By the Thames to all peoples of the world)
- Waltham Abbey: Sanctae Nomine Crucis (By the name of the Holy Cross)

===== Gloucestershire =====
- Cheltenham: Salubritas et eruditio (Health and education)
- Cirencester: Corinium floreat (May Corinium (Cirencester) flourish)
- Cotswold District: United we serve
- Gloucester: Fides invicta triumphat (Unconquered faith triumphs)
- Gloucestershire: Prorsum semper (Ever forwards)
- Tewkesbury Borough: In consilio sapientia (There is wisdom in counsel)

===== Greater London =====
- Barking and Dagenham: Dei Gratia Probemur Rebus (By the grace of God, let us be judged by our acts)
- Barnet: Unitas Efficit Ministerium (Unity makes service)
- Bexley: Boldly and Rightly
- Brent: Forward Together
- Bromley: Servire Populo (To serve the people)
- Camden: Non Sibi sed Toti (Not for oneself, but for all)
- Croydon: Ad Summa Nitamur (Let us strive after perfection)
- Ealing: Progress With Unity
- Enfield: By Industry Ever Stronger
- Greenwich: We Govern by Serving
- Hammersmith and Fulham: Spectemur Agendo (Let us be regarded according to our conduct)
- Haringey: Progress With Humanity
- Harrow: Salus Populi Suprema Lex (The health of the people is the supreme law)
- Havering: Liberty
- Hillingdon: Forward
- Hounslow: Iuncti Progrediamur (Let us progress together)
- Islington: We Serve
- Kensington and Chelsea: Quam Bonum In Unum Habitare (What a good thing it is to dwell together in unity)
- Lambeth: Spectemur Agendo (Let us be regarded according to our conduct)
- Lewisham: Salus Populi Suprema Lex (The health of the people is the supreme law)
- Merton: Stand Fast In Honour And Strength
- Newham: Progress with the People
- Redbridge: In Unity Progress
- Southwark: United to Serve
- Sutton: Per ardua in fide servite Deo (through difficulties serve God in faith)
- Tower Hamlets: From Great Things to Greater
- Waltham Forest: Fellowship Is Life
- Wandsworth: We Serve
- Westminster: Custodi Civitatem Domine (Guard the city, O Lord)

===== Greater Manchester =====
- Bolton: Supera moras (Overcome difficulties)
- Bury: Forward in unity
- Manchester: Concilio et Labore (By counsel and labour)
- Oldham: Sapere aude (Have courage to be wise)
- Stockport: Animo et fide (With courage and faith)
- Tameside: Industry and integrity
- Trafford: Hold fast that which is good
- Wigan: Ancient and Loyal

===== Hampshire =====
- New Forest: Old Yet Ever New
- Portsmouth: Heaven's Light Our Guide
- Romsey: Quae Recta Tene
- Rushmoor: Strength in Unity
- Test Valley: Deo Teste Valeamus (With God as our witness, let us be strong)

===== Hertfordshire =====
- Broxbourne: Cor Unum, Via Una (One heart, one way)
- Dacorum: The Borough of Dacorum
- Hertsmere: Do Well And Fear Not
- North Hertfordshire: Memores Acti, Prudentes Futuri
- Stevenage: The Heart of a Town Lies in its People
- Watford: Audentior (Bolder)
- Welwyn Hatfield: By Wisdom And Design

===== Kent =====
- Ashford: With Stronger Faith
- Canterbury: Ave Mater Angliae (Hail, Mother England)
- Dartford: Floreat Dartford (Let Dartford Flourish)
- Folkestone and Hythe: Amoenitas et Salubritas (Delightfulness and healthiness)
- Maidstone: Agriculture and Commerce
- Medway: Forward Together
- Swale: Known by their Fruits
- Tonbridge and Malling: Forward in Unison
- Tunbridge Wells: Do Well Doubt Not

===== Lancashire =====
- Blackburn: Arte et Labore (By art and labour)
- Blackpool: Progress
- Burnley: Hold to the truth
- Chorley: Be aware
- Fylde: Gaudeat ager (Let the field rejoice)
- Hyndburn: By industry and prudence
- Lancashire: In consilio consilium (In council is wisdom)
- Lancaster: Luck to loyne
- Pendle: In unitate florescemus (In unity we increasingly flourish)
- Rossendale: Prosperity through endeavour
- South Ribble: Progress with humanity
- West Lancashire: Salus populi suprema lex The well-being of the people is the supreme law)
- Wyre: Utraque parte fluminis (On either side of the river)

===== Leicestershire =====
- Leicester: Semper Eadem (Always the same)

===== Lincolnshire =====
- Mablethorpe: Amoeniora Litora Nostra (Our shores are more delightful) [1]

===== Merseyside =====
- Liverpool: Deus Nobis Haec Otia Fecit (God hath granted us this ease)

===== Norfolk =====
- Norwich: Do different

===== Northumbria =====
- Newcastle upon Tyne: Fortiter Defendit Triumphans (Triumph by brave defence) [5]

===== Suffolk =====
- Felixstowe: Felix sto we (Happy we stand)

===== Surrey =====
- Elmbridge: Dum Defluant Amnes (Until the rivers cease to flow)
- Epsom and Ewell: None Such
- Guildford: Fortiter et Fideliter (Bravely and faithfully)
- Mole Valley: Ministrando Vigilans (Vigilant in our serving)
- Spelthorne: Ad Solem Prospicimus (We look towards the Sun)
- Surrey Heath: Festina Diligenter (Make haste carefully)
- Tandridge: Concordia (Harmony)
- Reigate and Banstead: Never Wonne Ne Never Shall
- Runnymede: In Freedom We Serve
- Waverley: Oppida Rusque Una (Town and countryside in unity)
- Woking: Fide et Diligentia (In faith and diligence)

===== Sussex =====
- Brighton and Hove: Inter Undas et Colles Floremus (Between sea and downs we flourish)
- Crawley: I Grow and I Rejoice
- Eastbourne: Meliora Sequimur (We follow the better things)
- Horsham: Proudly We Serve
- Mid Sussex: Salus Populi Suprema Lex (The good of the people comes first)
- Wealden: Interiora Ruris (Rural interior)
- Worthing: Ex Terra Copiam e Mari Salutem (From the land, fullness; from the sea, health)

===== West Midlands =====
- Birmingham: Forward

===== Yorkshire =====
- Bradford: Progress, Industry, Humanity
- Calderdale: Industria Arte Prudentia (Industry, Skill, Foresight)
- Leeds: Pro Rege et Lege (For the king and the law)
- Rotherham: By Industry and Honour
- Sheffield: Deo Adjuvante, Labor Proficit (With God's help, our work is successful)
- Wakefield: Persevere and Prosper
- Yorkshireman's Motto: 'Ear all, see all, say nowt;Eyt all, sup all, pay nowt;And if ivver tha does owt fer nowt –Allus do it fer thissen.[11]

==== Scotland ====
- Aberdeen: French: Bon Accord (Good agreement)
- Arbroath: Propter libertatem (Latin: For Freedom)
- Braemar: Scots: Mak Siccar (Make sure)
- Clydebank: Labore et Scientia (By work and by knowledge)
- Dingwall: Salve corona
- Duns: Scots: Duns Dings Aw (Duns beats all)
- East Kilbride: Prosper but Dreid
- Edinburgh: Nisi Dominus frustra (Except the Lord [keep the city, the watchman waketh] in vain. Psalm 127)
- Falkirk: Scots: Touch Ane, Touch Aw – Better meddle wi the Deil than the bairns o Fawkirk (Strike one, strike all – easier fight with the devil than the children of Falkirk)
- Forfar: Ut quocunque paratus
- Galashiels: Scots: Soor Ploums (Sour Plums)
- Glasgow: Let Glasgow Flourish
- Irvine: Tandem bona causa triumphat (The good cause triumphs in the end)
- Jedburgh: Strenue et Prospere (With vigour and success)
- Kelso: Scots: Dae Richt – Fear Nocht (Do right — fear nought)
- Kinross: Scots: Siccar (Sure)
- Lerwick: Dispecta est et Thule
- Orkney Islands: Boreas domus mare amicus (Latin: The North our home, the sea our friend)
- Perth: Pro Rege, Lege et Grege (For the King, the Law and the People)
- Port Glasgow: Ter et Quarter anno Revisens Aequor Atlanticum Impune (Three and four times a year revisiting the Atlantic with impunity)
- Rosehearty: Scots: Tyauve awa Rosehearty (Strive always, Rosehearty)
- St Andrews: Dum spiro spero (While I breathe I hope)
- Selkirk: At spreta incolumem vita defendere famam
- Shetland Islands: Norn: Með lögum skal land byggja (By law shall the land be built up)
- Thurso: Scots: Wark tae God (Walk towards God)

==== Northern Ireland ====
===== County Antrim =====
- Antrim: Per Angusta ad Augusta
- Ballyclare: Industria et Probitate (By work and integrity)
- Ballymoney: Goodwill to all People
- Belfast: Pro tanto quid retribuamus (What shall we give in return for so much)
- Carrickfergus: Gloria Prisca Novatur (The glory of the Old made New)
- Larne: Falce Marique Potens (Powerful With the Sickle and on the Sea)
- Lisburn: Ex Igne Resurgam (I will arise from the fire)
- Newtownabbey: Multi in uno resurgent (Multi in uno resurgent)

===== County Armagh =====
- Armagh: In Concilio Consilium
- Craigavon: Together we progress
- Lurgan: Be just and fear not
- Portadown: ???

===== County Down =====
- Ards: Fidelis atque Fortis (Faithful and Brave)
- Bangor: Beannchor
- Banbridge: Per Deum et Industriam (By God and Industry)
- East Down: Ever looking forward
- Newtownards: Fidelis atque Fortis

===== County Fermanagh =====
- Enniskillen: Ut proavi in Deo confidemus
- Fermanagh: Feor Magh Eanagh

===== County Londonderry =====
- Coleraine: Cuil Rathain
- Limavady: Absit Invidia (Let there be no ill-will)
- Derry: Vita, Veritas, Victoria (Life, truth, victory)
- Magherafelt: Fide et Opera (With Faithfulness and Service)
- Moyle:

===== County Tyrone =====
- Cookstown: Forward
- Dungannon:
- Omagh: Oigh Magh

==== Wales ====
- Cardiff: Y Ddraig Goch Ddyry Cychwyn (Welsh: The red dragon leads the way)
- Merthyr Tydfil: Nid Cadern Ond Brodyrdde (Welsh: No strength but in fellowship)
- Llandudno: Hardd Hafan Hedd (Welsh: Beautiful haven of peace)
- Newport: Terra Marique (By land and sea)

=== United States ===
==== California ====
- Adelanto: Progress through unity
- Alameda: Prosperitas terra mari que (Prosperity from the land and sea)
- Banning: Proud History, Prosperous Tomorrow
- Berkeley: Westward the course of empire takes its way; / The first four Acts already past, / A fifth shall close the Drama with the day; / Time's noblest offspring is the last.
- Carson: Future Unlimited
- Ceres: Together We Achieve
- Del Mar: Multum in parvis (Much in little)
- Downey: Future Unlimited
- Eastvale: Family, Community, Diversity
- El Centro: Shining with Opportunity
- Eureka: Eureka (I have found it)
- Garden Grove: Absit invidia (Let envy be absent)Gardena: Freeway City
- Half Moon Bay: Vivir, trabajar, jugar (Live, work, play)
- Hanford: Planning Tomorrows
- Kerman: Community Comes First
- Lanare: Building from the Ground Up
- Manhattan Beach: Sun, Sand, Sea
- Millbrae: A Place in the Sun
- Monterey: Anda (Onward)
- Ontario: Balanced Community
- Orange Cove: Honoring Our Past, Embracing Our Future, Come Grow With Us; In God We Trust
- Paradise: In Harmony with Nature
- Redwood City: Climate Best by Government Test
- Rialto: Bridge to Progress
- San Diego: Semper vigilans (Always vigilant)
- San Francisco: Oro en Paz, Fierro en Guerra (Gold in peace, iron in war)
- Santa Fe Springs: Salus populi suprema lex exto (Let the welfare of the people be the supreme law)
- Upland: Madonna of the Trail

==== Florida ====
- Palm Bay: A Perfect Place to Grow

==== Illinois ====
- Chicago: Urbs In Horto (City in a garden)

==== Indiana ====
- East Chicago: Progredemur (We progress)
- Fort Wayne: Ke-ki-on-ga
- Hammond: Land of Calumet
- South Bend: Peace
- Valparaiso: Vale of Paradise

==== Iowa ====
- State of Iowa: Our liberties we prize and our rights we will maintain

==== Kentucky ====
- Campbellsville: Urbs progrediens media in civitate (City in the middle of the commonwealth)

==== Massachusetts ====
- Commonwealth of Massachusetts: Ense petit placidam sub libertate quietem (By the sword we seek peace, but peace only under liberty)
- Boston: Sicut patribus sit deus nobis (God be with us as He was with our fathers)
- Somerville: Municipal Freedom Gives National Strength

==== Maryland ====
- Baltimore: Believe

==== Michigan ====
- Detroit: Speramus meliora; resurget cineribus (We hope for better things; it will rise from the ashes)
- Grand Rapids: Motu Viget (strength in activity)

==== Minnesota ====
- Minneapolis: En Avant (Forward)

==== North Carolina ====
- North Carolina State Motto: Esse quam videri (To be rather than to seem)

==== Ohio ====
- Centerville: Progress, Stability
- Chillicothe: Primum capitolium Ohioensis (Ohio's first capital)
- Cincinnati: Juncta juvant (Unity assists)
- Cleveland: Progress & Prosperity
- Coldwater: The family is our most important product
- Dublin: where yesterday meets tomorrow
- Fairborn: Tradition, Innovation
- Obetz: For Work, For Play, For Everyone
- Parma: Progress Through Partnerships
- Reading: Wir Tun Unser Bestes (We Try Our Best)
- St. Marys: Where Living is a Pleasure; Urbs inter agros (City amid fields)
- Streetsboro: Gateway to Progress
- Toledo: Laborare est orare (To work is to pray)
- Union: Sheets Rifle

==== Oregon ====
- Oregon State Motto: She flies with her own wings
- Portland, Oregon: The City that Works

==== Pennsylvania ====
- Philadelphia: Philadelphia maneto (Let brotherly love continue)

==== Texas ====
- Austin, Texas: Friendship

==== Virginia ====
- Virginia State Motto: Sic semper tyrannus (Thus always to tyrants)
- Richmond, Virginia: Sic Itur Ad Astra (Such is the way to the Stars)

== British counties ==
=== England ===
==== Traditional ====
- Bedfordshire: Constant Be
- Buckinghamshire: Vestigia Nulla Retrorsum (No stepping back)
- Cambridgeshire: Per undas, per agros (Through waves, through fields)
- Cheshire: Jure et dignitate gladii (By the right and dignity of the sword)
- Cornwall: Cornish: Onen Hag Oll (One and all)
- Cumberland: Perfero (I carry through)
- Derbyshire: Bene consulendo (By good counsel)
- Devon: Auxilio Divino (By divine aid)
- Durham: Faith, foresight and industry
- Dorset: Who's Afear'd
- Essex: Many minds, one heart
- Gloucestershire: Prorsum Semper (Ever forward)
- Hampshire:
- Herefordshire: Pulchra Terra Dei Donum (This fair land is the gift of God)
- Hertfordshire: Trust and fear not
- Huntingdonshire: Labore Omnia Florent (By work everything flourishes)
- Kent: Invicta (Unconquered)
- Lancashire: In Concilio Consilium (In counsel is wisdom)
- Leicestershire: For'ard For'ard
- Lincolnshire: Perseverance vincit (Perseverance conquers)
- Middlesex:
- Norfolk:
- Northamptonshire: Rosa Concordiae Signum (The Rose—Emblem of Harmony)
- Northumberland: Northumberland
- Nottinghamshire: Sapienter proficiens (Progress with wisdom)
- Oxfordshire: Sapere Aude (Dare to be wise)
- Rutland: Multum in Parvo (Much in little)
- Shropshire: Floreat Salopia (Let Salop flourish)
- Somerset: Old English: Sumorsaete ealle (All the people of Somerset)
- Staffordshire: The knot unites
- Suffolk: Opus Nostrum Dirige (Direct our work)
- Surrey:
- Sussex: We wunt be druv (Sussaxon dialect: We won't be driven)
- Warwickshire: United to serve
- Westmorland:
- Yorkshire, East Riding: Tradition and Progress
- Yorkshire, North Riding:
- Yorkshire, West Riding: Audi Consilium (Heed counsel)
- Wiltshire:
- Worcestershire:

==== Ceremonial ====
- Bristol: Virtue et Industria (Virtue and hard work)
- Cumbria: Ad montes oculos levavi (I shall lift up mine eyes unto the mountains)
- East Sussex:
- Greater London:
- Greater Manchester: Ever Vigilant
- Isle of Wight: All this beauty is of God
- Merseyside: Unity in the Service of All
- North Yorkshire: Unitate Fortior (Stronger by union)
- South Yorkshire: Each shall strive for the Welfare of All
- Tyne and Wear:
- West Midlands: Forward in Unity
- West Sussex:
- West Yorkshire: By Effort Achieve

==== Former ====
- Avon:
- Cleveland: Endeavour
- Hereford and Worcester:
- Humberside: United we Flourish

=== Scotland ===
- Aberdeen: Bon Accord
- Angus: Scots: Lippen on Angus (Trust in Angus)
- Ayr: God Shaw the Right
- Banff: Spe et Spiritu (With hope and courage)
- Caithness: Commit thy Wark to God
- Clackmannan: Leuk aboot ye
- Dumfries:
- Dunbarton: Scottish Gaelic: Levenax (Land of the elm trees)
- East Lothian:
- Fife: Virtute et opera (By virtue and by industry)
- Inverness: Scottish Gaelic: Air son Math na Siorrachd (For the good of the county)
- Kincardine: Laus Deo (Praise to God)
- Kinross: For all Time
- Kirkcudbright:
- Lanark:
- Midlothian:
- Moray: In Spe (In hope)
- Nairn: Unite and be Mindful
- Orkney: Boreas Domus Mare Amicus (Home to the winds, friend of the sea)
- Peebles: Contra Nando Incrementum (There is increase by swimming against the stream)
- Perth: Pro Lege et Libertate (For law and liberty)
- Renfrew:
- Ross and Cromarty: Dread God and Do Well
- Roxburgh: Ne Cede Malis Sed Contra Audentior Ito (Yield not to misfortunes [evil things] but go on more boldly against them)
- Selkirk:
- Stirling:
- Sutherland: Scottish Gaelic: Dluth Lean Do Dhuthchas Le Durachd (Cling to thy heritage with diligence)
- West Lothian: Aye for the Common Weal
- Wigtown:
- Zetland: Icelandic: Með Lögum Skal Land Byggja (With laws shall this land be built)

=== Wales ===
==== Traditional ====
- Anglesey: Welsh: Môn Mam Cymru (Anglesey mother of Wales)
- Brecknock: Welsh: Undeb Hedd Llwyddiant (Unity, peace, prosperity)
- Caernarfon: Welsh: Cadernid Gwynedd (The strength of Gwynedd)
- Carmarthen: Welsh: Rhyddid gwerin ffyniant gwlad (A free people a prosperous country)
- Cardigan or Ceredigion: Welsh: Golud Gwlad Rhyddid (A nation's wealth is freedom)
- Denbigh: Welsh: Duw â digon (God is sufficient)
- Flint: Welsh: Gorau tarian, cyfiawnder (The best shield is justice)
- Glamorgan: Welsh: A ddioddefws a orfu (He that endureth, overcometh)
- Merioneth or Merionydd: Welsh: Tra Mor Tra Meirion (While the sea lasts, so shall Merionethshire)
- Monmouth: Utrique fidelis (Faithful to both)
- Montgomery: Welsh: Powys paradwys Cymru (Powys paradise of Wales)
- Pembroke: Ex unitate vires (Out of unity is strength)
- Radnor: Welsh: Ewch yn Uwch (Higher and higher)

==== Ceremonial ====
- Clwyd: Welsh: Tarian cyfiawnder Duw (The shield of justice is God)
- Dyfed: Welsh: Rhyddid Gwerin Ffyniant Gwlad (A free people, a prosperous country) – as Carmarthenshire
- Gwent: Utrique fidelis (Faithful to both) – as Monmouthshire
- Gwynedd: Welsh: Cadernid Gwynedd (The strength of Gwynedd) – as Caernarfonshire
- Mid Glamorgan: Welsh: A Ddioddefws a Orfu (He who suffers, conquers) – as Glamorgan
- Powys: Welsh: Undeb A Rhyddid (Unity and freedom)
- South Glamorgan: Welsh: Y Ddinas a'r Fro (The city and the vale)
- West Glamorgan: Welsh: Cardarn pob Cyfiawn (The just are strong)

== See also ==
- List of U.S. state and territory mottos
- List of national mottos
- List of university and college mottos
- List of sundial mottos
- List of United States Armed Forces unit mottoes
- Category:Latin mottos
- Category:Lists of mottos
