= The Cancer Prevention and Education Society =

UK health and education charity

The Cancer Prevention and Education Society is a UK Charity (No. 1089082) registered in 2002 in England and Wales.

== Overview ==
CPES is a science-based health and educational charity working to reduce the incidence of cancer and other illnesses by preventing human exposure to hazardous chemicals and other agents. It encourages: (1) Reducing human exposure to hazardous chemicals; and (2) for organizations to develop ‘green chemistry’ to substitute chemicals with bad persistent organic pollutant (POP) profiles – Persistence, Bioaccumulation and Toxicity.

The CPES website, provides readers with news and information on, cancer incidence rates in the United Kingdom, environmental contaminants linked with disease, key studies and links to other similar organisations.

== History ==
The Society was set up in response to the increasing scientific literature revealing links between chemicals and disease. It was felt that whilst other charities were covering research, patient care, diet and smoking, there was little being done to inform the medical community about the Public health implications of human exposure to chemicals; this rationale was bolstered by the knowledge that pharmaceuticals are highly evaluated and regulated whereas many synthetic chemicals are not.

== Research ==
CPES monitors the news for new research on Environmental Health. In 2005 it supported a review of the medical and scientific literature by Newby & Howard at the University of Liverpool on environmental causes of cancer. In addition, the charity also helped to fund a study, which utilised the Cancer Incidence Temporality Index, the development of which was also part-funded by the CPES.

== Information services ==
The Charity provides information to doctors and healthcare professionals, the scientific community, and the general public. News and scientific studies about Environmental health are collated on its website.

It also produces a free subscription e-publication Health and Environment providing an easy way to stay up-to-date on developments in environmental health issues and what they mean for health and healthcare.

== Influencing public policy ==
The charity works hard to promote prevention as a way of reducing cancer and other diseases. It sees the success of reducing lung cancer by smoking cessation programmes as a text book example of how prevention can work effectively. It would like to see healthcare professionals advocating for the reduction of human exposure to hazardous agents found in pesticides, consumer products, the home & work place, and pollution. It sees as ‘role models’ the work of the Canadian Cancer Society and the resolution of the American Medical Association to ‘encourage the training of medical students, physicians and other health professionals on the human health effects of toxic chemical exposures’.

== Fundraising ==
The Charity depends on individual donors to support its work.

== Partnerships ==
CPES communicates regularly with a number of organizations in the UK, Europe and North America who share their interest in raising awareness about the need to reduce human exposure to toxics including the, Collaborative for Health and the Environment, the Health and Environmental Alliance, and Health Care Without Harm.

== See also ==
- Cancer Epidemiology Unit
- Association of Cancer Physicians
