= UK Coronavirus Cancer Monitoring Project =

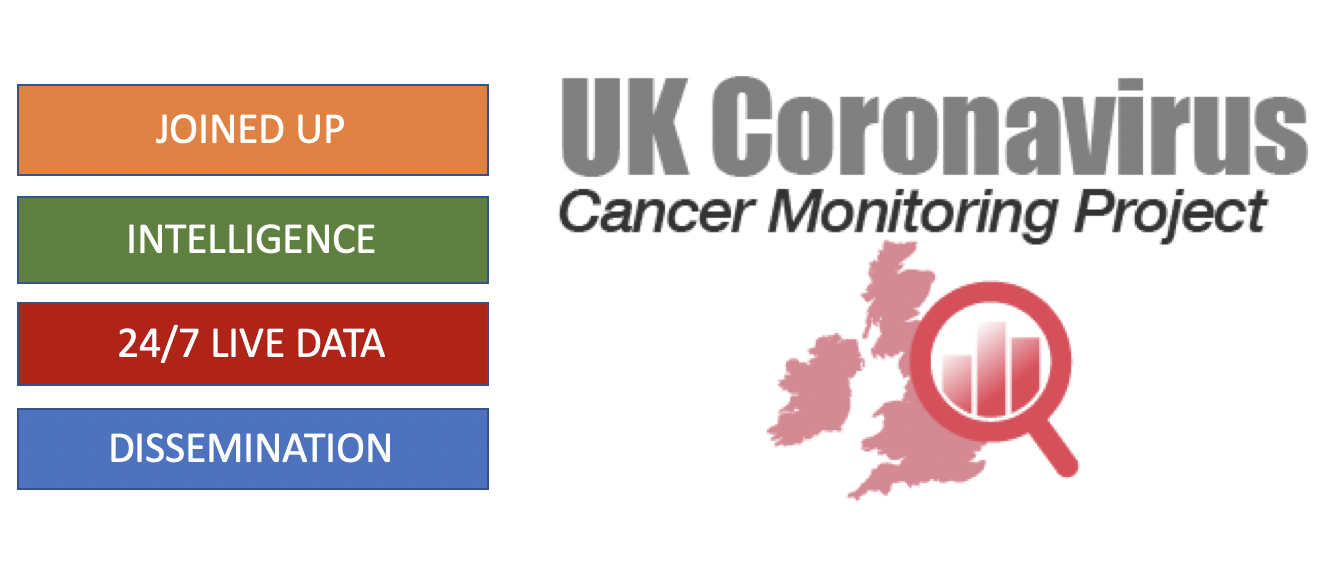
- Founded: 18 March 2020
- Key people: Gary Middleton, Jean-Baptiste Cazier, Rachel Kerr, Lennard Lee
- Website: ukcoronaviruscancermonitoring.com ukcovidcancerprogramme.org//

The UK Coronavirus Cancer Programme or UKCCP is one of the longest running UK pandemic research programmes to safeguard, monitor and protect individuals living with cancer from COVID-19 across the United Kingdom.

The project launched on 26 March 2020 and is one of the first emergency COVID-19 reporting projects in cancer patients in the world. At the time, there was no way of tracking cancer patients with COVID-19 and the interactions of the COVID-19 virus and cancer and cancer treatment was unclear, with limited reporting based on small patient studies. As a result, the reporting project launched as part of the United Kingdom's COVID-19 emergency response.

The objective from the project is to identify and learn from every case of COVID-19 in cancer patients through the United Kingdom's 86 cancer centres. To date, this UK pandemic Programme has successfully delivered 10 research projects and published over 15 research papers.

It has been successful in delivering meaningful change for cancer patients during the pandemic including:-

1. That chemotherapy delivery was safe for patients during the pandemic

2. The benefits of COVID screening to reduce risk of outbreaks in radiotherapy/chemotherapy units and cancer centres.

3. Vaccine effectiveness in cancer patients and the need for boosters.

4. The need to protect blood cancer patients and those on chemotherapy.

5. The importance of COVID-19 antibody testing as a risk prediction tool.

This research programme has been unique in being highly inclusive in approach. Over 250 oncologists have contributed to the project since its formation, drawing expertise from the network of 86 cancer centres.

== Support ==
The support from this project came from numerous groups. There was widespread support in the oncology professional communities including the Royal College of Radiologists, Association of Cancer Physicians and Action Radiotherapy, with the Royal College of Radiologists noting that the project was an example of "best practice to benefit oncology patients". Early academic institutional supporters were the University of Birmingham, University of Oxford and University of Leeds, and patient support groups include Macmillan Cancer Support.

== Funding ==
The project was launched in just 100 hours as a result of the pressing urgency of the clinical situation. The initial phases of funding were largely achieved through the donation of time and resources from the supporters and advocates of this project. The University of Birmingham played sizeable role in this process, with the pro-vice-chancellor dedicating the computational and human resources of the University's Centre for Computational Biology, the Institute of Translational Medicine and scientists from the Institute of Cancer and Genomic Sciences.. The project was further boosted by support by Blood Cancer UK in September 2020 with significant investment into automated data analysis platforms at the University of Birmingham.

== Organisation ==
Eighty-six adult cancer care centres participated in UKCCMP. Coronavirus Cancer Reporting was led by a Local Emergency Response Reporting Group at each cancer centre that typically included doctors, nurses and other medical health professionals. Communication channels were rapidly established between UK cancer centres with local reporting of all COVID-19 presentations. Weekly updates were dispatched to oncologists around the country, achieving close-to-real-time reporting.

The Paediatric UKCCMP signed up all principal treatment centres around the UK treating children with cancer within 3.5 weeks of launch. Real-time data sharing was enabled between the Paediatric UKCCMP and the Children's Cancer and Leukaemia Group, enabling informed decisions to be taken using the latest national dataset.

== Impact ==
The project aimed to provide regular data releases to clinicians to provide insight of high clinical utility to inform and facilitate key decision makers To this end, the project has encouraged a more collaborative approach to patient and clinical management across UK Cancer Centres.

Chemotherapy must continue during the pandemic.

The project was the joint first to recognise that the risk of COVID-19 and chemotherapy was significantly overstated. Previously, UK guidelines has suggested "patients with COVID-19 are at risk of severe disease following systemic anticancer treatment". The UKCCMP identified that recent chemotherapy use did not significantly increase mortality from COVID-19, and this was subsequently confirmed by a US cancer COVID-19 registry and a French breast cancer registry. A survey completed in January 2021 showed that 90% of individuals who were involved in the UKCCMP email and bulletin distribution list had changed their prescribing habits based on the findings from the UKCCMP. Globally, all major cancer professional organisations now support the uninterrupted delivery of cancer care to individuals with cancer, except in the very highest risk settings.

Blood cancer patients and other subgroups require more protection

The UKCCMP was also the first to perform an analysis by cancer subtype identifying that blood cancer patients were at significantly increased risk. This observations enabled groups advocating for blood cancer suffers to enter the United Kingdom's "clinically vulnerable" COVID-19 list enabling access to additional payments and support. The study also found that risk was lowest in patients with breast cancer and ovarian/cervical cancers, and highest in those with prostate cancer. This effect was largely driven by the protective nature of being female and the risk factor of being of increasing age.

Cancer patients should have access to intensive care units

The UKCCMP was one of the first groups to flag the major issue of poor access to ITU for individuals with cancer during the early phases of the pandemic in 2020. Subsequent UK studies have confirmed dispelled the myth that cancer patients do significantly worse when admitted to ITU and therefore should not be given access. This has led to significantly higher admissions amongst the cancer population to ITU.

Promoting the best care for childhood cancer

The paediatric UKCCMP cohort also made pivotal insights noting that in children who developed a SARS-CoV-2 infection, having a diagnosis of cancer did not put that at increased risk. This was an extremely reassuring finding that enabled the paediatric cancer community to continue the uninterrupted delivery of anti-cancer treatments globally in the confidence that they were not putting children at risk. This finding also enabled children in the United Kingdom to be removed from the clinically extremely vulnerable shielding group, enabling children with cancer to continue to mix with their peer group and continue their normal activities.

Screening for COVID-19 in chemotherapy and radiotherapy units will stop outbreaks

The UK Birmingham Chemotherapy cancer COVID-19 project analysed the utility of testing every patient on chemotherapy for COVID-19 using PCR nasopharyngeal swab screening. This was the first study in the world to show the clinical utility of screening for COVID-19 to prevent outbreaks amongst highly vulnerable patients who were immunocompromised.

Vaccines work for cancer patients, but they need boosters

Following the advent of mass coronavirus vaccination, in early 2022 UKCCP then delivered a national flagship research project that showed that vaccines work for cancer patients. This analysis was required as none of the original licensing studies for coronavirus vaccination were done in cancer patients and so the effectiveness of this approach were unknown.

The study was the largest global cancer/COVID study in the world. It analysed the national pandemic dataset and analysed 377 194 cancer patients. It provided definitive proof that coronavirus vaccines protected cancer patients and was published in lancet oncology. However, the study also identified the issue of waning vaccine effectiveness in cancer patients for the first time and made the case for a third dose vaccination booster.

This was followed by a follow-up analysis of the vaccine effectiveness of vaccine boosters. This confirmed that ongoing boosters were required for cancer patients in order to maintain vaccine effectiveness, however, that there were some groups in whom this strategy was less likely to benefit, such as blood cancer patients.

== Case numbers ==
The first recorded cases of COVID-19 in cancer patients started in March 2020. Numbers were initially slow, but by April 2020, number of cancer patients with COVID-19 reached their peak, with over 300 cases were being recorded each week. As a result of data from this project and NHS guidance about the delivery of cancer care during the pandemic, widespread changes to cancer care was implemented to reduce risk to cancer patients. The number of COVID-19 in cancer patients decreased during June and July and in the entire month of August, only one case of a cancer patient with COVID-19 was recorded.

In 2021, the UKCCP transformed from being a registry based system to establishing as a Population-scale data programme. This enabled comprehensive tracking of coronavirus cases across the United Kingdom. The latest analysis showed that coronavirus cases in cancer patients closely follows cases in the population and by December 2021, over 351,000 cancer patients had contracted a PCR-positive SARS-CoV-2 infection.

== Project structure ==
2020 Registry based system

The original UK Coronavirus cancer monitoring project was a clinician-led reporting project that depends on the time and skills of the oncology community in the United Kingdom. The project was conceived on 18 March 2020 and launched on 26 March 2020 with support from the University of Birmingham and several oncology organisations within the United Kingdom. It was a registry based system requiring input of clinical data from sites. The project team is chaired by Professor Gary Middleton, Professor Jean-Baptiste Cazier, Professor Rachel Kerr and Dr Lennard Lee, and is composed of academic and clinical teams led by the scientific board for data acquisition, analysis and dissemination. The project management team consists of researchers from all major UK cancer centres including King's College London, University of Leeds, University of Edinburgh, the Clatterbridge Cancer Centre, and University College London.

2021 Population-scale data programme

In 2021, the project underwent a programme of digital transformation. The registry-based system provided by the University of Birmingham was transformed into a population-scale data programme using cases identified from the national pandemic datasets. This digital transformation process was initiated as the original registry-based system required ongoing input by clinicians and medical health professions. The population-scale dataset programme was co-led by Prof Peter Johnson, Dr Tom Fowler and Dr Lennard Lee with analytical support provided by senior analysts at UKHSA and University of Birmingham.

== Prizes ==
In 2022, UK COVID Cancer programme took on additional responsibility to acknowledge the work by the UK cancer community by informing the global pandemic response. Prizes have been awarded to teams and individuals and acknowledge work for the pandemic response. The awardees were:-

October 2022- The NCRI Consumer forum, as "example of embedded patient involvement ultimately lead to the UKCCP convincingly demonstrating that chemotherapy should be continued during the coronavirus pandemic and lead to a resumption of cancer care globally in 2020"

== Projects ==
The UK COVID cancer projects have demonstrated how to deliver safe cancer care during the pandemic and informed global practice globally. The team have ensured that meaningful clinical changes have been delivered from each of the projects that maximise the safety of cancer patients during the pandemic.

The ten projects delivered as part of this programme includes

- The 3 UK Coronavirus cancer monitoring projects (UKCCMP)
- The 2 paediatric cancer monitoring projects (UKPCCMP)
- The UK blood cancer project (UKCCHP1)
- The Birmingham Coronavirus Cancer Monitoring project (BCCMP)
- The vaccine effectiveness project (UKCCEP)
- The National COVID Cancer Antibody Survey (NCCAS).
- The safe prescribing project (COV-SPOT)

More details on the project can be found below.

=== UKCCMP1 ===
March 2020-May 2020

Adult cancer patients

Headline findings: "that chemotherapy can be safely delivered during the COVID-19 pandemic during wave 1"

Impact: A strategic change in thinking about cancer care during the coronavirus pandemic leading to increased chemotherapy prescribing globally.

Commentary: Clinical Oncology, Lancet Oncology, BJC

Published report: The Lancet

=== UKCCMP2 ===
May 2020-Oct 2020, Adult cancer patients

Headline findings: "that blood cancer patients are at significantly increased risk. That ITU admissions for cancer patients were significantly low"

Impact: A landmark shift in terms of COVID/cancer strategy to protect those most at risk and the creation of a shielding list for blood cancer patients. Additionally, significant momentum generated to enable cancer patients with coronavirus to access ITU care.

Published report: The Lancet

=== UKPCCMP1 ===
June 2020-Dec 2020, Paediatric cancer patients

Headline findings: "children with haematological malignancies who have not had an allogeneic stem cell transplant are not at greater risk of severe infection with COVID-19 than other children with cancer"

Impact: ". Children with haematological malignancies need not be considered extremely vulnerable and should continue with standard of care therapy without modification attendant on the SARS-CoV-2 pandemic."

Published report: BJC

=== BCCMP ===
April 2020-June 2020, Cancer patients undergoing chemotherapy

Headline findings: "Screening cancer patients for coronavirus prior to chemotherapy is an effective strategy to keep cancer units coronavirus free"

Impact: "Increase in screening for cancer patients undergoing chemotherapy. This now forms the standard first line protective measure for UK chemotherapy centres"

Published report: Cancer Cell

=== UKPCCMP2 ===
Dec 2020-July 2021, Paediatric cancer patients

Headline findings: "children with cancer with SARS-CoV-2 infection do not appear at increased risk of severe infection compared to the general paediatric population"

Impact: "Essential to continued routine cancer care for children and young patients with malignancy"

Published report: BMJ

=== UKCMHP ===
July 2021-Nov 2021 Blood cancer patients

Headline findings: One of the largest blood cancer coronavirus studies of its kind analysing risk factors for coronavirus death. Uncontrolled disease is a major driver of risk, conferring greater risk than recent anticancer treatment"

Impact: "A renewed focus to ensure that disease control for blood cancer patients"

Published report: BJH

=== UKCCMP3 ===
Oct 2020-Feb 2022, Adult cancer patients

Headline findings: "Immunotherapy and chemotherapy are not driving excess coronavirus deaths in cancer patients"

Impact: "Confirmation to the clinical community of the importance of ongoing cancer care to ensure that all patients come forwards and can access UK cancer services"

Published report: Jama open

=== UKCCEP ===
Feb 2021-May 2022, Adult cancer patients

Headline findings: "Vaccine effectiveness in cancer patients wanes at 3-6m"

Impact: "Prioritisation for cancer patients to get booster programmes"

Commentary: eCancer

Published report: Lancet Oncology

=== UKCCEP2 ===
Feb 2022-May 2022, Adult cancer patients

Headline findings: ""Third dose booster work for most cancer types, but cancer patients remain at higher risk of severe COVID-19 hospitalisation and death than the population"

Impact: "Re-shaping of UK priority lists to have a more comprehensive list of cancer patients "

Published report: European Journal of cancer

=== NCCAS ===
August 2021-October 2022, Adult cancer patients

Headline findings: "Project due to report Q2 2022″

Impact: "Project due to report Q2 2022"

Published report: "in progress"

=== Safe prescribing ===
March 2022-Ongoing, Adult cancer patients

Headline findings: "Project due to report Q3 2022″

Impact: "Project due to report Q3 2022″

Published report: "in progress"

== Impact ==
The project was commended by the inquiry report of the All Party Parliamentary Groups for Vulnerable groups. It noted the importance and benefit of our research in delivering important data on vulnerable groups very quickly. Our data also formed the basis of the May 2022 independent government report identifying cancer patients most in need of further protection.
