= FACP =

FACP may mean:

- Fellow of the American College of Physicians
- Fellow of the American College of Prosthodontists
- Fellow of the Australasian College of Pharmacy
- Fire alarm control panel
- Front for Joint Provisional Action, in the Chadian–Libyan conflict
