= Association of Chinese Professionals =

Association of Chinese Professionals (ACP) is a name for a number of not-for-profit organizations in United States of America, and potentially some local organizations in Australia, Europe, and China. These organizations do not share any organizational or hierarchical relations.

== History ==
An organization was first registered in the state of New Jersey in the early 1992 under the name "Association of Chinese Professionals" (ACP) with a Chinese name "中华专业人士协会". At that time, the first wave of the students from Mainland China was graduating from graduate schools and entering into the American work force. Many of them felt the need for having means to get reconnected to their peers after leaving schools. A Ph. D. graduate from Georgia Tech Mr. Wenming Kuai (蒯文明) made the first call by sending an email for this organization. Later a mailing list on listserver at emailogy.com was requested by Kuai to enable communications between the members. The list server was maintained by Xuning Shan (单旭宁), a Ph.D. graduate from Johns Hopkins University and a computer and network guru. Kuai's call for the organization received worldwide responses. The original name of the organization was called Chinese Professional Club (CPC).

CPC was loosely organized as a social network. But the members felt the need to formalize the organization structure. A preparatory committee of twelve members was formed. The twelve members are Wenming Kuai (蒯文明), Kai Liu (刘凯), Zhaohua Deng (邓照华), Andrew Chu (初迅), Yadong Liu (刘亚东), Lingxiong Shao (邵凌雄), Taoyun Wang (王桃云), Jiaqin Yang (杨家勤), Dan Luo (罗丹), Yang Wang (王阳), Renda Yuan (袁仁达) and Fan Yang (扬凡) – also jokingly known as "The Dirty Dozen". Lingxiong Shao, a Ph.D. a research assistant professor at the University of Pennsylvania, took the task to register ACP as a non-profit organization in the State of New Jersey. In the meantime, a board of trustees was formed and the Constitution was created in accordance with the laws. The board of trustees consisted of 16 members, 12 of which were executive committee members and 4 were chairmen of Special Interest Groups (SIG).

The 12 members of the preparatory committee formed the executive committee. Dr. Wenming Kuai was elected the first President of the organization and Dr. Kai Liu was the first Vice President. Andrew Chu was the Regional Chapter Coordinator. Zhaohua Deng was the Treasurer. Yadong Liu was the Membership Manager. Dan Luo was the Special Project Manager. Lingxiong Shao was the Network and Legal Manager. Taoyun Wang was the Editor-in-Chief of ACP Mutual, an ACP official newsletter. Yang Wang was the Special Interest Group (SIG) Coordinator. Jiaqin Yang was the Business SIG Chairman. Renda Yuan was the General Secretary. Fan Yang was the Director of Public Relations. The other 4 members of Board of Trustees are Minqi Bao (鲍民齐), the Physics SIG Chairman; Huamin Ma (马华民), ACP-EAM SIG Chairman; Dex Shi (施德祥), the Entrepreneur SIG Chairman; and Ninjian Wang(王宁建), the Computer Software SIG Chairman.

This organization grew rapidly, under competitions of other not-for-profit organizations of similar purpose, noticeably from the CAST (Chinese Association of Science and Technology) based in New York City. A number of local activities were organized in ACP's headquarter the Greater Philadelphia Metropolitan Area. An archive below shows that ACP were offering four services to its members. A number of attempts were made to solicit sponsorship for the new born without fruition. However, delegation from ACP was invited to participate and had contributed in numerous discussions with official delegations from China on topics of major concerns such as the industrial sectors the Chinese economy should first concentrate to develop. In the early 1993, the First National Assembly of Association of Chinese Professionals was held in Newark, Delaware. Shortly after the national organization was formed, members of the board of trustees formed local chapters in different areas across the nation. Lingxiong Shao formed the Greater Philadelphia Local Chapter. Dex Shi formed the Atlanta Local Chapter. Taoyun Wang formed Syracuse Local Chapter. Huamin Ma formed Santa Barbara Local Chapter. Jiaqin Yang formed Grand Forks Local Chapter. Ironically, the formation of the local chapters made the national organization irrelevant since almost all of the events and activities were localized.

There was a reason for the term "Chinese Professionals" (中华专业人士) to be chosen in the organization's name. At the time of its inception, a number of other not-for-profit organizations were being organized by these new Chinese immigrants, and in general all of the other organizations had been set up for a specialized field, such as practice of laws, chemical engineering, or general science and technology. In the case of ACP, its founding members included not only engineers and researchers, but also other professionals such as insurance agents. The name was then chosen to cover all walks of business, and it proved to be a wise choice.

== Existing independent organizations ==
- "美国宾州-费城华人科技协会 Association of Chinese Professionals" is the not-for-profit organization registered in Philadelphia, Pennsylvania United States of America.
- "亚特兰大中华专业人士协会 - Association of Chinese Professionals, Atlanta (ACP-Atlanta)" is the not-for-profit organization registered in Atlanta, Georgia, United States of America.
- "ACP Foundation 美中专业人士协会（ACP）" is the not-for-profit organization registered in Dallas, Texas, United States of America.

There are other organizations under the name "Chinese Professionals", including the followings:

- "华人青年协会 Chinese Young Professionals Networking (CYPN)" is a Massachusetts registered non-profit organization founded in 2010.
- "奥兰多中国专业人士协会 Orlando Chinese Professional Association (OCPA)" is a Florida registered non-profit organization founded in June 1995 by a group of dedicated and enthusiastic Chinese professionals in Orlando.
- "美国华人专业人士协会 American Association of Chinese Professionals (AACP)" is a California non-profit organization founded in 2007 by a group of dedicated and enthusiastic Chinese professionals.
- "加拿大中国专业人士协会 Chinese Professionals Association of Canada (CPAC)" is a federally registered not-for-profit organization founded in 1992.

== Notes ==
- The original email that called for this organization from Kuai was available before sometime in 2008, but now it cannot be found. The initial discussion for this organization was communicated through the mailing list soc.culture.china on the Internet prior to the invention of HTTP protocol and the Mosaic browser. Another email that intended to clarify the purpose of the organization (which was initially called CPC, Chinese Professionals Club) sent on January 3, 1992, by Kuai can be found in Google cached pages.
- The archived email below shows services that the young organization was offering to its members, including a yellow page service to allow members to reach out when the concept of searching engine has not been proposed, and a relocation assistance service that attempted to help the newly graduated Chinese professionals to settle down in their first jobs with limited budget. After clicking on the reference link, the reader may need to unfold the emails by clicking on arrows at the upper right corner to see the full text.
- So many organizations were registered by these Chinese immigrants at the time that once Professor Wen Yuankai (温元凯) with USTC (University of Science and Technology of China) had teased that “你们现在这里成立组织多得就跟当年文化大革命成立战斗队似的” in his speech to the Chinese students in University of Delaware. Most of these organizations were organized by the new graduates from engineering schools. A very small number of Chinese students in that era was studying liberal arts or business in USA.
