= Associated Construction Publications =

- Type: business magazine
- Format: Paper
- Owner: John White
- Founded: varies
- Language: English
- Headquarters: Indianapolis, Indiana, USA
- Circulation: 100,206
- Website: www.acppubs.com

The Associated Construction Publications are 13 trade publications and a combined web site owned by John White that serves the information needs of contractors, materials producers, equipment users and allies to the field of construction. Greg Sitek is the national editor.

The 13 magazines are regional publications, distributed in different geographic areas across the U.S.

- California Builder & Engineer, established in 1893, is written for people in California, Hawaii and Western Nevada. Chad Dorn is the Associated Publisher.
- Construction, established in 1933, is written for people in North Carolina, South Carolina, Maryland, Virginia, West Virginia and Washington, D.C. Chad Dorn is the Associated Publisher.
- "Construction Digest", established in 1932 covers Illinois, Indiana, Ohio and Kentucky. Peter Leviton and Jim Reid have shared responsibility for this publication.
- Construction News, established in 1934, is written for people in Western Tennessee, Mississippi, Arkansas, Louisiana, and Oklahoma. Walt Robertson, Mandy Preston and Mary Anne Nichol share responsibility for this magazine.
- Constructioneer, established in 1945, is written for people in New York, New Jersey, Pennsylvania and Delaware. Al Fournier is the Associate Publisher.
- Dixie Contractor, established in 1926, is written for people in Georgia, Florida, Alabama and Eastern Tennessee. Chad Dorn is the Associate Publisher.
- Michigan Contractor & Builder, established in 1907, is written for people in Michigan. The current Associate Publisher is Peter Leviton.
- Midwest Contractor, established in 1901, is written for people in Iowa, Kansas, Nebraska and Missouri. Mandy Preston is the Associate Publisher
- New England Construction, established in 1936, is written for people in Maine, Rhode Island, Vermont, New Hampshire, Massachusetts, and Connecticut. Al Fournier is the Associate Publisher and his brother Paul Fournier is the feature editor
- Pacific Builder & Engineer, established in 1902, is written for people in Montana, Idaho, Oregon, Washington, and Alaska. Chad Dorn is the Associate Publisher.
- Rocky Mountain Construction, established in 1953, is written for people in Colorado, Wyoming, Utah, Arizona, New Mexico, and Nevada. Chad Dorn is the Associate Publisher
- Texas Contractor, established in 1923, is written for people in Texas. The current editor is Liz Moucka and Walt Robertson is the Associate Publisher.
- Western Builder, established in 1902, is written for people in Wisconsin and Michigan. Peter Leviton serves as the Associate Publisher.

All of the magazines are published monthly.

As of July 2009, total audited circulation is 100,206 subscribers.

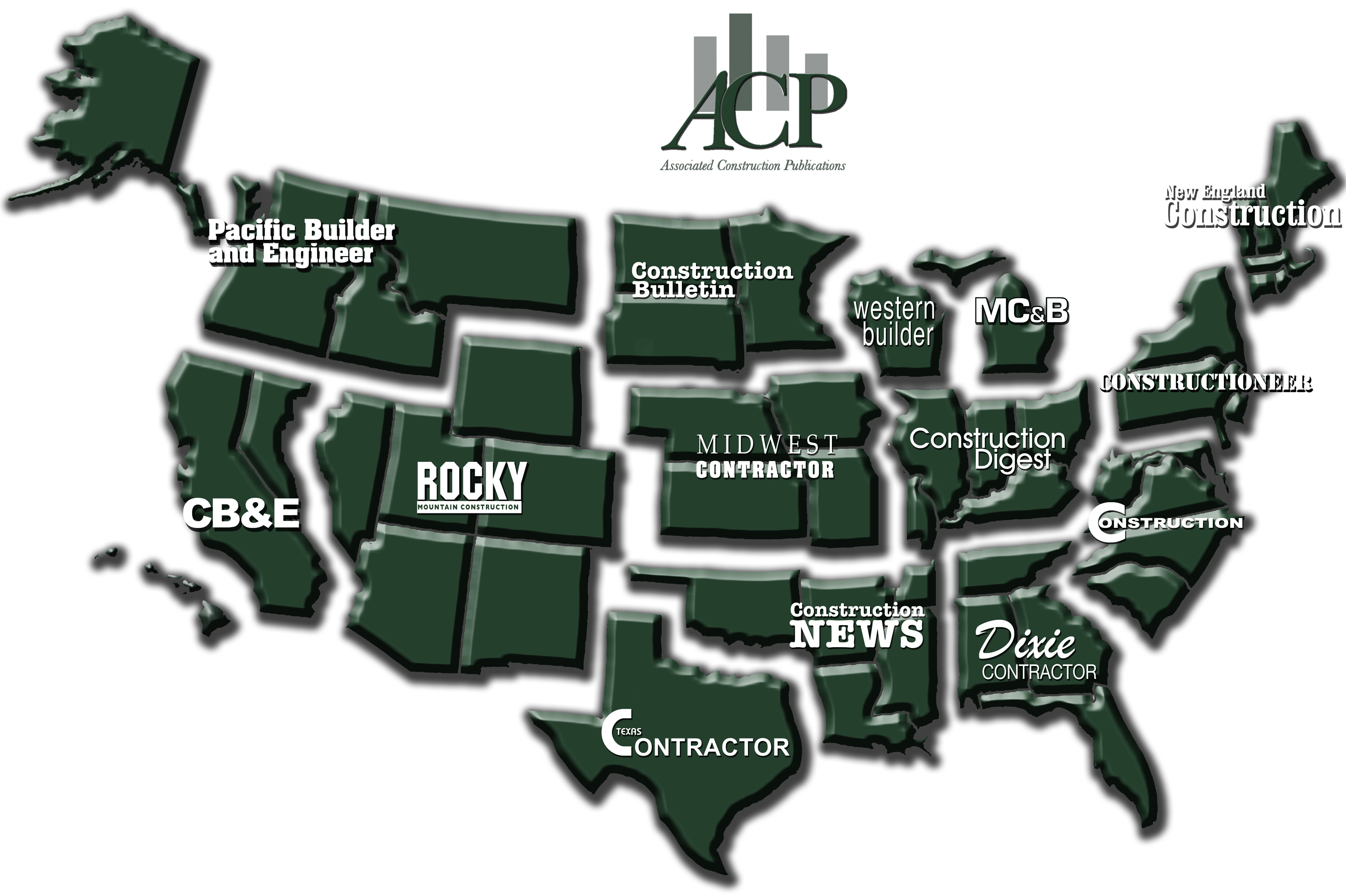
map of territory covered by each of the 13 ACP magazines and Construction Bulletin (owned by RBI)
