= List of United States Armed Forces unit mottoes =

Many units of the United States Armed Forces have distinctive mottoes. Such mottoes are used in order to "reflect and reinforce" each unit's values and traditions. Mottoes are used by both military branches and smaller units. While some mottoes are official, others are unofficial. Some appear on unit patches, such as the U.S. Army's distinctive unit insignia.

The use of mottoes is as old as the U.S. military itself. A general order issued by George Washington on February 20, 1776, when he was commander-in-chief of the Continental Army, directed that "it is necessary that every Regiment should be furnished with Colours" and the "Number of the Regiment is to be mark'd on the Colours, and such a Motto, as the Colonel may choose, in fixing upon which, the General advises a Consultation amongst them."

== United States Army ==
=== Major Commands ===
- United States Army - This We'll Defend
- School of Military Packaging Technology (formerly Joint Military Packaging Training Center) - To Preserve and Protect
- Joint Multinational Readiness Center - Train to Win
- Joint Readiness Training Center - Forging the Warrior Spirit
- Joint Security Area, United Nations Command - Panmunjom (JSA) - In Front Of Them All
- Army Judge Advocate General's Corps - Soldiers first, lawyers always
- United States Army Legal Services Agency - Latin: Legibus Armisque Devoti, lit. 'Devoted to Law and Arms'
- Army Criminal Investigation Command - Do What Has to Be Done
- Army Materiel Command - Arsenal for the Brave
- Headquarters, Military District of Washington - Latin: Haec Protegimus, lit. 'This We Guard'
- Military Traffic Management Command - Serving the Armed Forces
- National Training Center - Lead Train Win
- Northern Warfare Training Center - Latin: Hiemes Oppugnamus et Montes Superamus, lit. 'We Battle Cold and Conquer Mountains'
- United States Military Academy (West Point) - Duty, Honor, Country (adopted 1898)
- United States Army Special Forces (Green Berets) - Latin: De Oppresso Liber, lit. 'To Free the Oppressed'
- Army Medical Department - To Conserve Fighting Strength
- United States Army Military Police Corps - Assist. Protect. Defend.

=== Adjutant general ===
- Adjutant General's Corps - Defend and Serve
- 4th Adjutant General Battalion - High Above the Rest
- 6th Adjutant General Battalion - Train Defend Serve
- 14th Adjutant General Battalion - Victory Through Excellence
- 30th Adjutant General Battalion - Meeting the Challenge
- 39th Adjutant General Battalion - Excellence Starts Here
- 42d Adjutant General Battalion - Impolite Militem (Start the Soldier)
- 43d Adjutant General Battalion - Soldiers for Freedom
- 46th Adjutant General Battalion - Begin with the Best
- 67th Adjutant General Battalion - Prepared and Able
- 95th Adjutant General Battalion - Soldiering Starts Here
- 120th Adjutant General Battalion - We Set the Example
- 369th Adjutant General Battalion - Army Pride

=== Airborne ===
The shoulder sleeve insignia of the XVIII Airborne Corps bears its motto, Sky Dragons.

- XVIII Airborne Corps - Sky Dragons
- 82nd Airborne Division - "All the way! or Death from Above
- 101st Airborne Division - Rendezvous with Destiny
- 71st Airborne Brigade - Go Texans Go
- 173rd Airborne Brigade - Sky Soldiers
- 82nd Airborne Division Artillery - Mass the Fire
- 101st Airborne Division Artillery - De Nubibus (From the Clouds)
- Combat Aviation Brigade, 82nd Airborne Division - Wings of the Airborne
- Combat Aviation Brigade, 101st Airborne Division - Wings of Destiny
- 82nd Airborne Aviation Regiment - Ground Air Mobility
- 101st Airborne Aviation Regiment - Wings of the Eagle
- 16th Air Traffic Control Battalion - Voice to the Skies
- 29th Air Traffic Control Battalion - Vector to Victory
- 58th Air Traffic Control Battalion - Deconflict Lead the Way
- 59th Air Traffic Control Battalion - Voice of Control
- 125th Air Traffic Control Battalion - Voice of the Aviation
- 118th Military Police Company (ABN) - Heaven Sent, Hell Bent! The Mighty Mighty

=== Armored ===
- 1st Armored Division - Old Ironsides
- 2nd Armored Division - Hell on Wheels
- 3rd Armored Division - Spearhead
- 13th Armored Division - It Shall Be Done
- 40th Armored Brigade - Old Hickory Volunteers
- 31st Armored Brigade - Dixie Brigade
- 32nd Armor Regiment - Victory or Death
- 33rd Armor Regiment - Men of War
- 35th Armor Regiment - Vincere Vel Mori (To Conquer or Die)
- 36th Brigade, 50th Armored Division - I'll Lead You (quotation attributed to John Bell Hood)
- 37th Armor Regiment - Courage Conquers
- 40th Armor Regiment - By Force and Valor
- 40th Armored Brigade - Armipotent (Mighty in Arms)
- 49th Armored Division - Lone Star
- 50th Armor - In Via (On the Way)
- 53rd Armor - Strength in Steel
- 64th Armor - We Pierce
- 68th Armor - Ventre A Terre (With Great Speed)
- 69th Armor - Vitesse et Puissance (Speed and Power)
- 70th Armor - Strike Swiftly
- 72nd Armor - Crusaders
- 77th Armor Regiment - Insiste Firmiter (Stand Firmly)
- 101st Cavalry Regiment - To The Utmost!
- 104th Cavalry Regiment - Over, Under, Or Through

=== Artillery ===
- 19th Field Artillery Regiment - Latin: Per Scintillam, Flamma, lit. 'Through the spark, the flame'
- 319th Field Artillery Regiment - Loyalty
- 320th Field Artillery Regiment - Latin: Volens et Potens, lit. 'Willing and Able'
- 321st Field Artillery Regiment - Latin: Noli Me Tangere, lit. 'Don't Touch Me'
- 333rd Field Artillery Regiment - Three Rounds
- 377th Field Artillery Regiment - Latin: Firmiter et Fideliter, lit. 'Steadfastly and Faithfully'
- 428th Field Artillery Brigade - Support Reinforce Defend
- 434th Field Artillery Brigade - Service with Pride
- 479th Field Artillery Brigade - Dependable Support
- 487th Field Artillery Regiment - Hiki Ni (Certainly, It Can Be Done)
- 512th Artillery Group - Valor About All
- 514th Artillery Group - Protect and Provide
- 528th Artillery Group - Monstrans Viam (Pointing the Way)
- 548th Artillery Group - Reliable and Relentlessness
- 552nd Artillery Group - Mission and Teamwork
- 557th Artillery Group - Nihil Obstat (Nothing Stands in Our Way)
- 558th Artillery Group - Honor Guides Our Power
- 559th Artillery Group - Spina Frontis (Backbone of the Front)
- 570th Artillery Group - The Professionals
- 623rd Field Artillery Regiment - Seize the Opportunity
- 631st Field Artillery Brigade - Fast Competent Accurate

=== Aviation ===
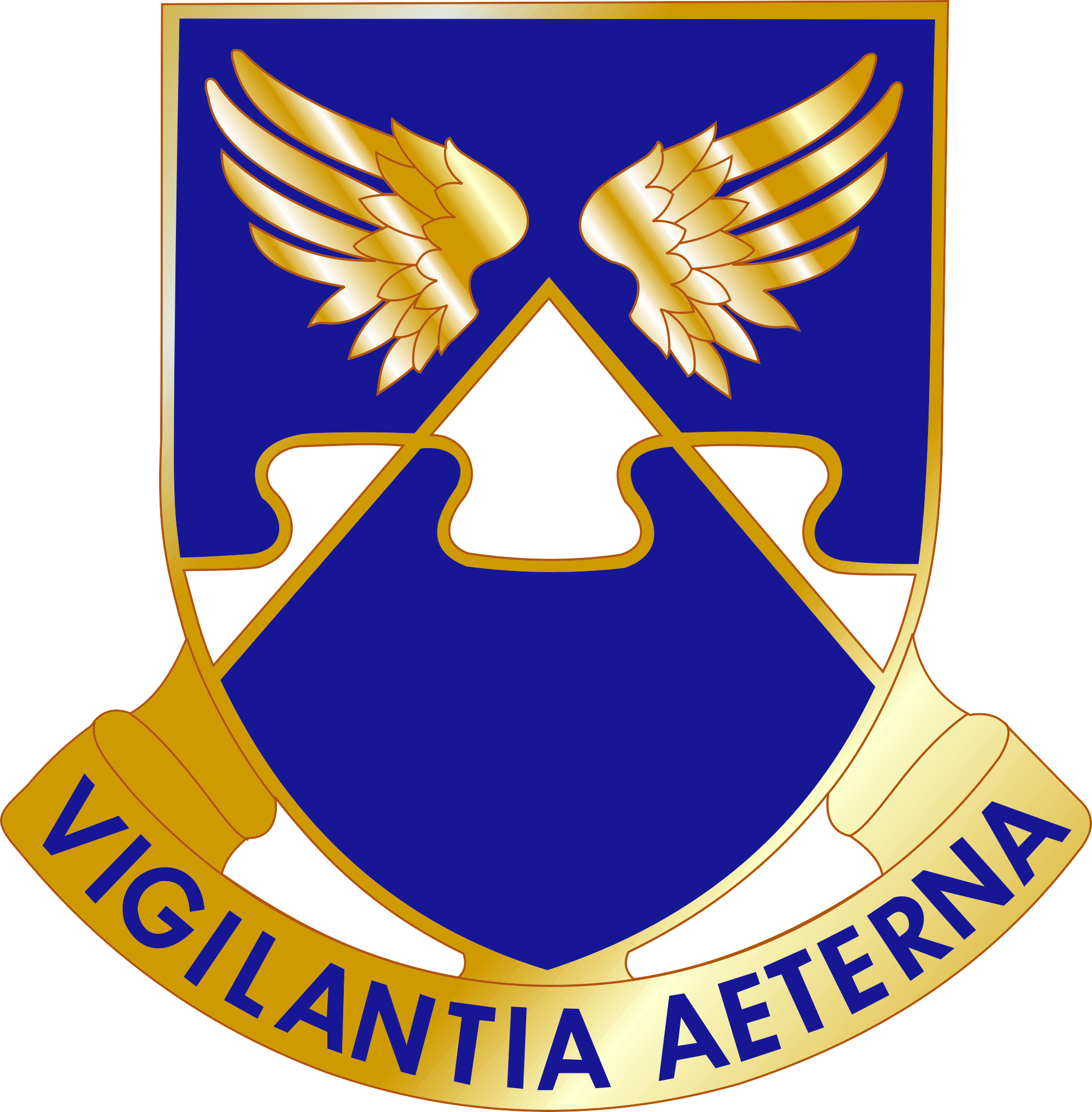
The 4th Aviation Regiment's motto is Vigilantia Aeterna (Eternal Vigilance)

- Aviation Center of Excellence - Above The Best
- 1st Aviation Regiment - Super Primum
- 2d Aviation Regiment - Excelsus (Lofty)
- 3d Aviation Regiment - Ex Alis Pugnamus (We Fight on Wings)
- 4th Aviation Regiment - Vigilantia Aeterna (Eternal Vigilance)
- 5th Aviation Regiment - Acute and Alert
- 7th Aviation Battalion - Lucky Seven
- 8th Aviation Battalion - To the Sound of Guns
- 9th Aviation - Anytime Anywhere
- 10th Aviation Battalion - Soldiers of the Sky
- 110th Aviation Brigade (formerly 10th Aviation Group) - Will Do
- 11th Aviation Battalion - Exempla Proponere (To Set Forth Examples)
- 11th Aviation Group - We Make the Difference
- 12th Aviation Group - Ad Excelsum Conamur (Strive for Excellence)
- 13th Aviation Battalion - Swift and Deadly (formerly: Shield of the Mekong)
- 14th Aviation Battalion - Versatility
- 15th Aviation Group - Flying Mustangs
- 16th Aviation Battalion - Parati Respondere (Ready to Respond)
- 16th Aviation Group - Born in Battle
- 17th Aviation Brigade - Freedom's Eagles
- 18th Aviation Battalion -Swift Mobility
- 19th Aviation Battalion - Mobilitas (Mobility)
- 20th Aviation Battalion - Peak of Performance
- 21st Aviation Battalion - Peace and War
- 22d Aviation Battalion - Proud and Professional
- 24th Aviation - Ever Watchful
- 25th Aviation - Lele Makou No Na Puali (We Fly for the Troops)
- 28th Aviation - The Eye of an Eagle
- 29th Division - 29 Let's Go
- 31st Aviation Group - That We May Serve
- 32d Aviation Group - Talons of Victory
- 33d Aviation Brigade - Into Combat We Fly
- 33d Aviation Group - Pride Courage Valor
- 140th Aviation - Cura et Perfectio (Accuracy and Perfection)
- 45th Aviation Battalion - We Try Harder
- 46th Aviation Battalion - Over and Above
- 532d Aviation Battalion - Support Everywhere
- 55th Aviation Battalion - Wings of Victory

=== Infantry ===
- U.S. Army Infantry School - Follow Me
- 1st Infantry Division - No Mission Too Difficult, No Sacrifice Too Great, Duty First
- 2nd Infantry Division - Second to None
- 3rd Infantry Division - French: Nous Resterons La, lit. 'We Shall Remain There'
- 4th Infantry Division - Steadfast and Loyal
- 7th Infantry Division - Light, Silent, and Deadly
- 10th Mountain Division - Climb to Glory
- 25th Infantry Division - Tropic Lightning
- 28th Infantry Division - Roll On
- 29th Infantry Division - 29 Let's Go
- 34th Infantry Division- ATTACK! ATTACK! ATTACK!
- 197th Infantry Brigade - Forever Forward!
- 198th Infantry Brigade - Brave and Bold
- 199th Infantry Brigade - Light, Swift, Accurate
- 1st Infantry Regiment - Latin: Semper Primus, lit. 'Always First'
- 2nd Infantry Regiment - Latin: Noli Me Tangere, lit. 'Touch me not'
- 3rd Infantry Regiment - Latin: Noli Me Tangere, lit. 'Touch me not'
- 4th Infantry Regiment - Latin: Noli Me Tangere, lit. 'Touch me not'
- 5th Infantry Regiment - I'll Try, Sir
- 6th Infantry Regiment - Unity is Strength
- 7th Infantry Regiment - Latin: Volens et Potens, lit. 'Willing and Able'
- 8th Infantry Regiment - Latin: Patriae Fidelitas, lit. 'Loyalty to Country'
- 9th Infantry Regiment - Keep Up The Fire!
- 10th Infantry Regiment - Courage and Fidelity
- 13th Infantry Regiment - Forty rounds
- 15th Infantry Regiment - Can do
- 17th Infantry Regiment - Truth and Courage
- 20th Infantry Regiment - To The Limit of Our Ability
- 75th Ranger Regiment - Latin: Sua Sponte, lit. 'Of Their Own Accord'
- 116th Infantry Regiment - Ever Forward
- 133rd Infantry Regiment - Old French: Avauncez, lit. 'Advance!'
- 442nd Infantry Regiment - Go for broke
- 501st Infantry Regiment - Geronimo!
- 502nd Infantry Regiment - Strike
- 503rd Infantry Regiment - The Rock
- 504th Infantry Regiment - Strike Hold
- 505th Infantry Regiment - H-Minus
- 506th Infantry Regiment - Cherokee: Currahee, lit. '"Stand alone" or "Stand alone together"'
- 507th Parachute Infantry Regiment - Down to Earth
- 508th Infantry Regiment - Fury From the Sky
- 509th Infantry Regiment - All The Way

=== Signal ===
- U.S. Army Signal Corps - Pro Patria Vigilans (Watchful for the Country)

=== Other ===
- 1st Military Intelligence Battalion (Aerial Exploitation) - Informare Laboramus ("We Labor to Inform")
- Explosive Ordnance Disposal - Initial Success or Total Failure
- Reconnaissance and Surveillance Leaders Course - In Orbe Terrum Non Visi ("Never Seen on Earth")

== U.S. Marine Corps ==
- United States Marine Corps - Latin: Semper Fidelis (adopted in the 1880s; prior motto was Latin: Per Mare, Per Terram, lit. 'By Sea By Land', the same motto as the Royal Marines)
- Marine Corps Embassy Security Group - In Every Clime and Place
- 1st Marine Division - No Better Friend, No Worse Enemy
- 3rd Marine Division - Fidelity, Honor, Valor
- 1st Battalion, 4th Marines - Whatever It Takes

== U.S. Navy ==
- United States Navy – In 1992, the U.S. Navy officially adopted "Honor, Courage, Commitment" as its standing motto.
- Naval Construction Forces (Seabees) - Construimus, Batuimus (We build, we fight)
- Special Warfare Combatant Craft Crewmen 'On Time, On Target, Never Quit.'
- Navy Supply Corps - Ready for Sea
- Navy SEALs - "The only easy day was yesterday"
- Navy divers - "We dive the world over"
- United States Naval Academy – Latin: Ex Scientia Tridens (From Knowledge, Seapower)
- Fire controlman - "Search, track, shoot, kill"

== U.S. Air Force ==
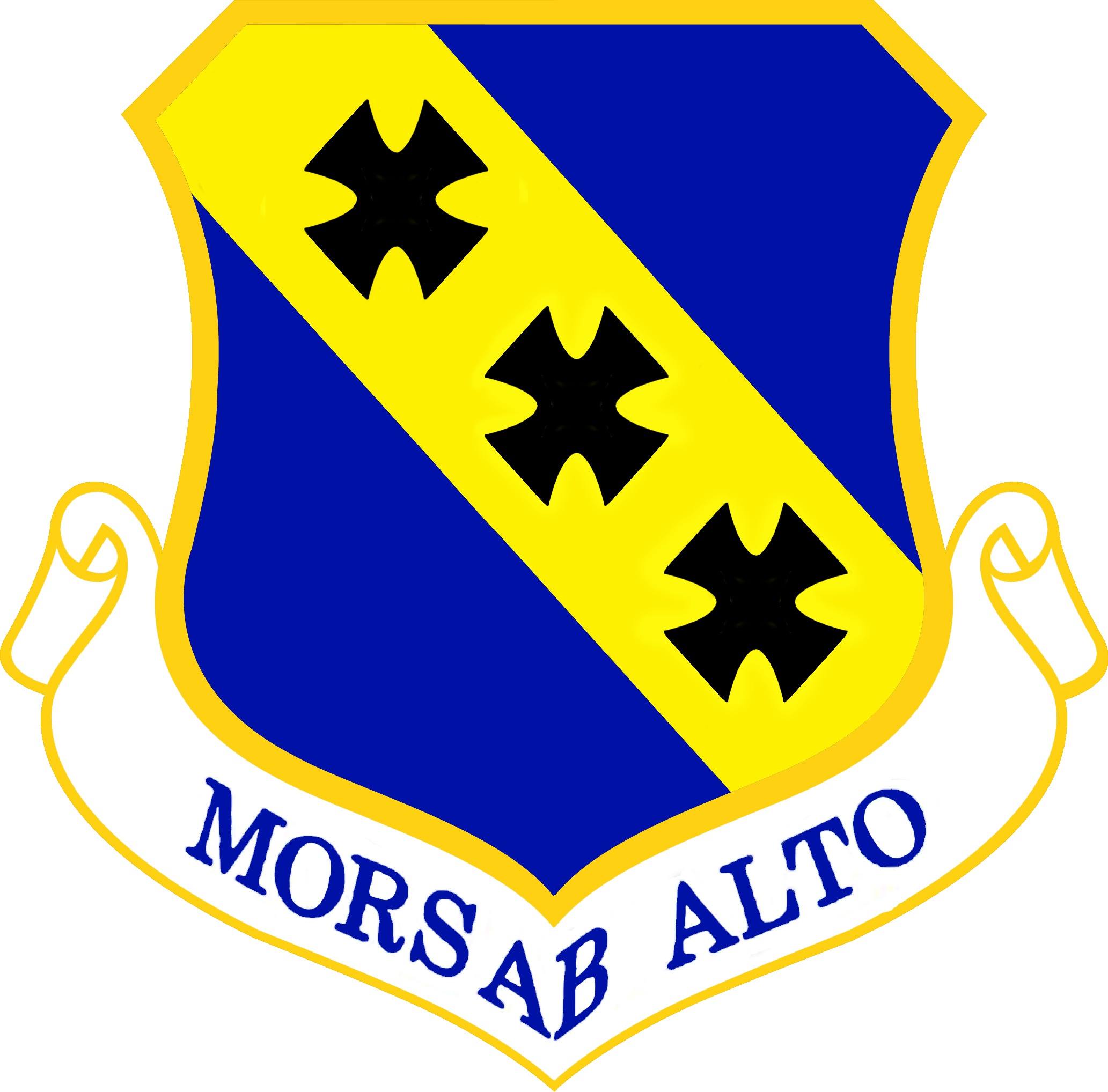
The 7th Bomb Wing's motto is Mors Ab Alto (Death From Above).

- United States Air Force - Aim High... Fly, Fight, Win
- Alaskan Air Command - Top Cover for America
- Strategic Air Command - Peace is Our Profession
- 1st Special Operations Wing - Any Time, Any Place
- 1st Tactical Fighter Wing - Aut Vincere Aut Mori (Conquer or Die)
- 2d Bomb Wing - Libertatem Defendimus (Liberty We Defend)
- 4th Tactical Fighter Wing - Fourth But First
- 5th Bomb Wing - Kiai O Ka Lewa (Guardians of the Upper Realm)
- 6th Air Mobility Wing (formerly 6th Strategic Wing) - Parati Defendere (Ready to Defend)
- 7th Bomb Wing - Mors Ab Alto (Death From Above)
- 8th Tactical Fighter Wing - Attaquez et Conquerez (Attack and Conquer)
- 9th Strategic Reconnaissance Wing - Semper Paratus (Always Ready)
- 10th Tactical Reconnaissance Wing - Argus (Ceaseless Watch)
- 11th Air Refueling Wing - Progresso Sine Timore Aut Praejudicio (Progress without Fear or Prejudice)
- 12th Flying Training Wing - Spiritus Omnia Vincet (The Spirit Conquers All)
- 14th Flying Training Wing - Day and Night—Peace and War
- 15th Air Base Wing - None. From 1942 to 1992, the motto was Prosequor Alis (I Pursue with Wings). In December 1992, the Air Force Historical Research Agency approved the wing commander's request to delete the motto since it was no longer applicable to the unit's mission.
- 17th Bombardment Wing - Toujours Au Danger (Ever Into Danger)
- 18th Tactical Fighter Wing - Unguibus et Rostro (With Talons and Beak)
- 19th Airlift Wing (formerly 19th Bombardment Wing) - In Alis Vincimus (On Wings We Conquer)
- 20th Tactical Fighter Wing - Victory By Valor
- 21st Composite Wing - Fortitudo et Preparatio (Strength and Preparedness)
- 22d Air Refueling Wing (formerly 22d Bombardment Wing) - Ducemus (We Lead)
- 23d Tactical Fighter Wing - Flying Tigers: Gentle Paws—Sharp Claws
- 24th Special Operations Wing (formerly 24th Composite Wing) - Los Profesionales (The Professionals)
- 25th Tactical Reconnaissance Wing - Guard With Power
- 26th Tactical Reconnaissance Wing - Saber Es Poder (Knowledge is Power)
- 27th Special Operations Wing (formerly 27th Tactical Fighter Wing) - Intelligent Strength
- 28th Bombardment Wing - Guardian of the North
- 31st Tactical Fighter Wing - Return With Honor
- 33rd Tactical Fighter Wing - Fire From the Clouds
- 35th Tactical Fighter Wing - Attack to Defend
- 36th Tactical Fighter Wing - Prepared to Prevail
- 37th Tactical Fighter Wing - Defender of the Crossroads
- 38th Flying Training Wing - Valor With Progress
- 42d Air Base Wing (formerly 42d Bombardment Wing) - Aethera Nobis (The Skies for Us)
- 43d Strategic Wing - Willing, Able, Ready
- 44th Missile Wing (formerly 44th Strategic Missile Wing (ICBM—Minuteman)) - Aggressor Beware
- 46th Test Wing (formerly 46th Aerospace Defense Wing) - Support
- 48th Tactical Fighter Wing - Statue de La Liberte (The Statue of Liberty)
- 49th Tactical Fighter Wing - Tutor et Ultor (I Protect and Avenge)
- 50th Tactical Fighter Wing - Master of the Sky
- 51st Fighter Wing (formerly 51st Tactical Fighter Wing) - Leading the Charge (1993–present); Deftly and Swiftly (former motto)
- 52d Tactical Fighter Wing - Seek, Attack, Destroy
- 55th Wing (formerly 55th Strategic Reconnaissance Wing) - Videmus Omnia (We See All)
- 56th Tactical Fighter Wing - Cave Tonitrum (Beware of the Thunderbolt)
- 58th Tactical Training Wing - Non Revertar Inultus (I Will Not Return Unavenged)
- 63d Military Airlift Wing - Omnia Ubique Semper (Anything, Anywhere, Anytime)
- 66th Tactical Reconnaissance Wing - Omnia Conspicimus (We Observe All)
- 67th Tactical Reconnaissance Wing - Lux ex Tenebris (Light from Darkness)
- 68th Bombardment Wing - Follow Me
- 70th Bombardment Wing - Strength Through Unity
- 75th Tactical Reconnaissance Wing - Apperceptive
- 76th Military Airlift Wing - Our Observation, Your Security
- 78th Flying Training Wing - Above the Foe
- 80th Flying Training Wing - Angels on Our Wings
- 81st Tactical Fighter Wing - Le Nom Les Armes La Loyaute (The Name, the Arms, and Loyalty)
- 82d Flying Training Wing - Adorimuini - Up and at 'em!
- 84th Combat Sustainment Wing (formerly 84th Fighter-All Weather Wing) - Cursum Perfico (I Accomplish My Course)
- 86th Tactical Fighter Wing - Virtus Perdurat (Courage Will Endure)
- 89th Airlift Wing - Experto Crede (Trust One Who Has Had Experience)
- 90th Missile Wing - Impavide (Undauntedly)
- 91st Missile Wing - Poised for Peace
- 92d Air Refueling Wing (formerly 92d Bombardment Wing) - Duplum Incolumitatis (Twofold Security)
- 94th Airlift Wing - Minuteman Wing
- 95th Strategic Wing - Justice with Victory
- 96th Test Wing (formerly 96th Bombardment Wing) - E Sempre L'ora (It is Always the Hour)
- 97th Air Mobility Wing (formerly 97th Bombardment Wing) - Venit Hora (The Hour Has Come)
- 98th Strategic Wing - Force for Freedom
- 99th Bombardment Wing - Caveant Aggressores (Let Aggressors Beware)
- 100th Air Refueling Wing - Peace Through Strength
- 146th Airlift Wing - The Hollywood Guard
- 301st Air Refueling Wing - Who Fears?
- 302d Airlift Wing (formerly 302d Tactical Airlift Wing) - Justem et Tenacem (Just and Resolute)
- 303d Aeronautical Systems Wing (formerly 303d Bombardment Wing) - Might in Flight
- 305th Air Mobility Wing (formerly 305th Air Refueling Wing) - Can Do
- 582d Air Resupply and Communications Wing - Libertas Per Veritatem (Freedom Through Truth)
- 306th Strategic Wing - Abundance of Strength
- 308th Armament Systems Wing - Non Sibi Sed Aliis (Not for Self, But for Others)
- 316th Tactical Airlift Wing - Valor Without Arms

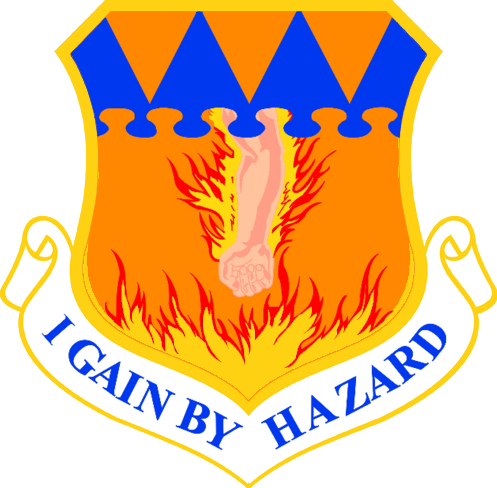
The motto of the 317th Tactical Airlift Wing is I Gain By Hazard.

- 317th Tactical Airlift Wing - I Gain By Hazard
- 319th Air Base Wing (formerly 319th Bombardment Wing) - Defensores Libertatis (Defenders of Freedom)
- 320th Air Expeditionary Wing (formerly 320th Bombardment Wing) - Strength Through Awareness

== U.S. Space Force ==
- United States Space Force - Latin: Semper Supra, lit. 'Always Above'
- Space Training and Readiness Delta (Provisional) – Latin: Si Vis Pacem, Para Bellum, lit. 'If you want peace, prepare for war'
- Space Delta 2 – Sentinels
- Space Delta 4 – Latin: Videmus Mundum, lit. 'We see the world'
- Space Delta 9 – Stormbringers

== U.S. Coast Guard ==

- United States Coast Guard - Latin: Semper Paratus, lit. 'Always Ready' (The Latin motto is also the name of the USCG service song, 'Semper Paratus' composed in 1927)
- Maritime Security Response Team (MSRT) - ‘Nox Noctis est Nostr’ (The Night is Ours)
- Office of Search and Rescue - ‘So Others May Live’
- Helicopter Interdiction Tactical Squadron - ‘Force From Above’
- United States Life-Saving Service (predecessor to the USCG) - 'You have to go out, but you don’t have to come back'

== National Guard ==
- National Guard of the United States: Always Ready, Always There
- District of Columbia Army National Guard - Capital Guardians
- Florida Army National Guard - We Accept the Challenge
- Hawaii Army National Guard - Onipaa Mau Loa (Steadfast Forever)
- Maine Army National Guard - Dirigo (I Direct or I Guide) (also the state motto)
- Maryland Army National Guard - Fatti Maschi Parole Femine (also the state motto)
- Massachusetts Army National Guard - Ense Petit Placidam (also the state motto)
- Michigan Army National Guard - With Honor We Serve
- Missouri Army National Guard - Protectors of Peace
- North Carolina Army National Guard - Always Ready, Ready Team
- North Carolina Army National Guard - 30th Brigade Combat Team, (Formerly 30th Infantry)Old Hickory
- Vermont National Guard - Put the Vermonters Ahead - from General John Sedgwick's order on the road to Gettysburg
- Pennsylvania National Guard - Civilian in peace. Soldier in war.
