= ACPS =

ACPS may refer to:

- Adamjee Cantonment Public School
- Alachua County Public Schools
- Albemarle County Public Schools
- Alexandria City Public Schools
- Atlantic City Public Schools
