= Australasian College of Pharmacy =

Industry education organization

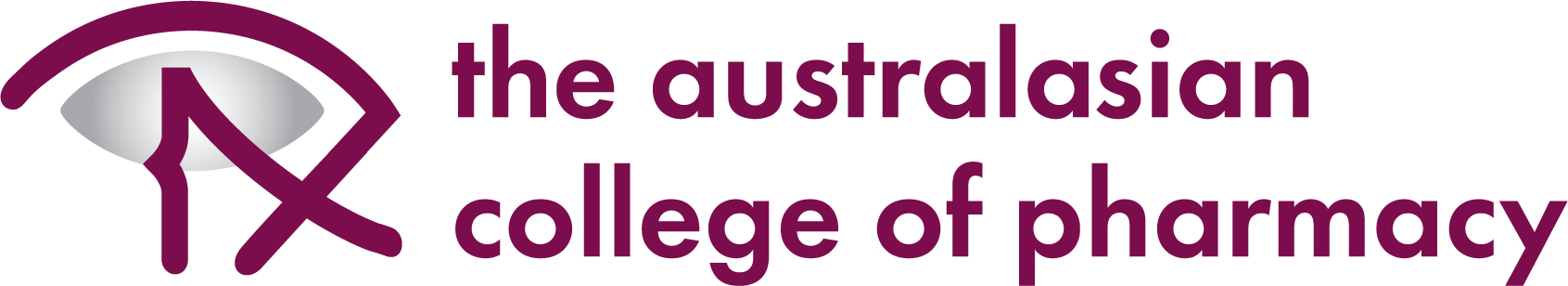
- Formation: 1976
- Location: 132 Leichhardt Street, Spring Hill, Queensland, Australia 4000
- President: Mr Aaron D'Souza
- CEO: Ms Amanda Seeto
- Immediate Past President: Ms Michelle Bou-Samra
- Website: http://www.acp.edu.au/

The Australasian College of Pharmacy (ACP) provides professional education for the pharmacy industry in Australia and New Zealand and has done so for over 40 years. Members of the college are entitled to use the postnominal MACP, Associate Fellows AFACP, while Fellows of the college use FACP.

== History ==
The Australasian College of Pharmacy was established in 1976 as the Australian Institute of Pharmacy Management (AIPM). The college has absorbed The Australian College of Pharmacy Practice (ACPP) in 2004 and The Australasian Compounders Association in 2011. In 2020, the college transitioned from the Australian to the Australasian College of Pharmacy; expanding its educational offering throughout the region. The College is a wholly owned subsidiary of the Pharmacy Guild, Queensland Branch.

== Structure and governance ==
The college is governed by an eight-member board who are elected by college members. The Australasian College of Pharmacy Pty Ltd is a private company limited by shares held entirely by the Pharmacy Guild of Australia (Queensland Branch), as its parent entity.

The educational offering of the college is overseen by an Academic Board. The role of the Academic Board is to act as ACP's Accreditation Committee; oversee the development of the college's academic activities in order to maintain the academic standard of all educational modules supplied by the college, ensuring currency and relevancy; and advise ACP Board on education policy matters.

== Registered training organisation ==
The college is one of the profession's limited number of training organisations registered with the Commonwealth of Australia's Department of Education, Employment and Workplace Relations. National Training Information Service College Registration.

The college is accredited to provide training, including the awarding of Diplomas and Advanced Diplomas. From 2011, the college has offered the following courses:

- Diploma of Human Resources Management
- Diploma of Leadership and Management
- Advanced Diploma of Leadership and Management

== Clinical education ==
The college offers an accredited Medication Management Review Stage 1 course that enables graduates to apply for the Association of Australian Consultant Pharmacists' (AACP) Stage 2 accreditation. Pharmacists wanting to increase or update their pharmacotherapeutic and pathophysiological knowledge may be interested in enrolling in Patient Care modules; each module is based around a major organ group, e.g. cardiovascular and renal therapeutics. Pharmacists wishing to complete a set number of units may qualify for the Award of 'Fellow by Examination' of the college.
