= Association of Cancer Physicians =

Specialty association in the United Kingdom for medical oncologists

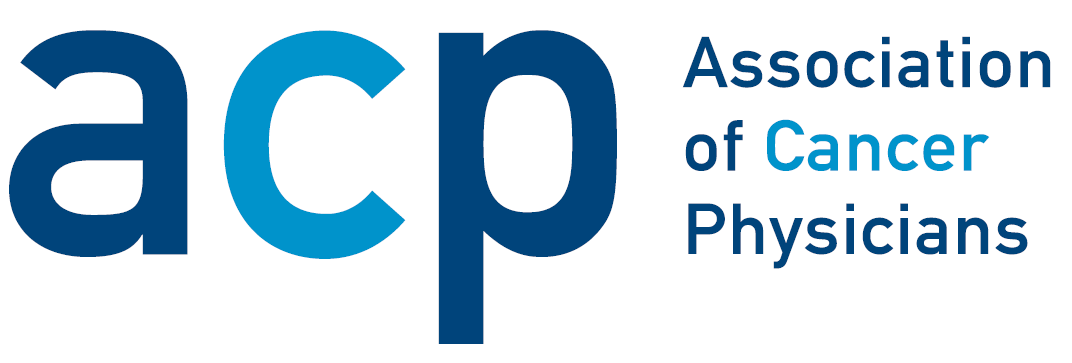
- Abbreviation: ACP
- Formation: 1994
- Type: Specialty Medical Association
- Legal status: Charitable Organisation
- Location: United Kingdom
- Website: theacp.org.uk

The Association of Cancer Physicians (ACP) is a specialty association in the United Kingdom for medical oncologists. The ACP is recognised by the Royal College of Physicians and the Department of Health, and provides training and regular meetings for members.

Membership of the ACP gives medical oncologists an independent voice in the affairs of the Royal College of Physicians, the Joint Collegiate Council for Oncology (JCCO) and the Specialty Advisory Committee (SAC), who supervise training and accreditation.

Through this, we:

- Promote the views and interests of medical oncologists to the DoH and RCP
- Influence policy on consultant expansion
- Develop training curricula and the upcoming specialty examination
- Participate in NICE appraisal and guideline development
- Encourage the development of best practice to benefit patients
- Nominate members for National Clinical Excellence Awards

== Meetings and workshops ==
Calendar of Events

2017

- 18–19 March: The Association of Cancer Physicians New Consultants Group Meeting, Manchester
- 15–16 June: UK Oncology Forum Conference and Annual General Meeting of the Association of Cancer Physicians, Birmingham
- 13 October: The Association of Cancer Physicians Workshop on Immunotherapies, Manchester
- 14–15 October: The Association of Cancer Physicians Trainees Weekend, Manchester

2016

- 12 March: The Association of Cancer Physicians New Consultants Group Meeting, Manchester
- 14 October: The Association of Cancer Physicians Workshop on Patient Centred and Integrated Cancer Care, Manchester
- 15–16 October: The Association of Cancer Physicians Trainees Weekend, Manchester
- 7 November: The Association of Cancer Physicians Annual General Meeting, NCRI Conference, Liverpool
- 11 November: The Late Medical Effects of Cancer Treatment, The Royal College of Physicians, London

2015

- Friday 6 March Third Symposium on primary breast cancer in older women, East Midlands Conference Centre, Nottingham
- 7–8 March ACP New Consultants Group Weekend, Hyatt Regency Hotel, Birmingham
- 18 September British Geriatrics Society Oncogeriatrics Special Interest Group Meeting, Wellcome Collection, London
- 17–18 October ACP Cancer Physicians in Training weekend, DoubleTree by Hilton, Manchester Piccadilly

== Publications ==
- Response to 'Cancer Drug, Ethics and Survival' published in the BMJ
- Association of Cancer Physicians Strategy, published in eCancer
- Letter to the Secretary of State for Health regarding junior doctors' contract
- Review of the Pattern of Cancer Services in England and Wales, Southampton

== Textbooks ==
- Problem Solving through Precision Medicine, Clinical Publishing, 2016
- Problem Solving in Old Cancer Patients, Clinical Publishing, 2015 - Winner of the BMA Medical Books Awards, 2016
- Problem Solving in Acute Oncology, Clinical Publishing, 2014

== See also ==
- Cancer in the United Kingdom
- Cancer
- Immunotherapy
- Precision Medicine
- Chemotherapy
- Experimental cancer treatments
- Clinical Trials
