= La Nation, la Loi, le Roi =

National motto of France during constitutional period (1791–1792)

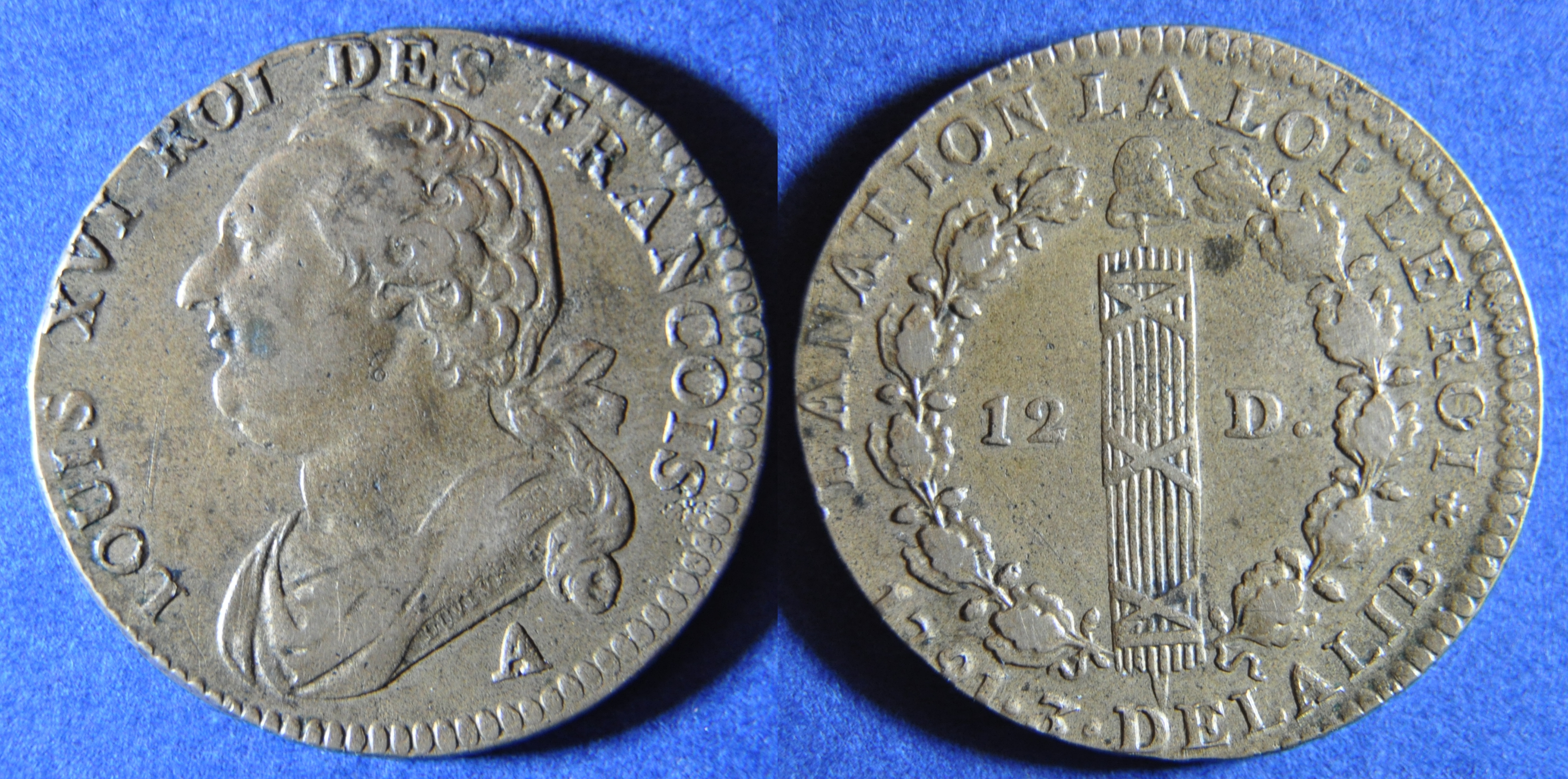
12 Deniers coin (1791).

La Nation, la Loi, le Roi (lit. 'The Nation, the Law, the King') was the national motto of France during the constitutional period of the French monarchy, and is an example of a tripartite motto – much like the popular revolutionary slogan; Liberté, égalité, fraternité.

The motto itself was featured on the French Constitution of 1791 – and also on the currency of the period.

== See also ==
- Orthodoxy, Autocracy, and Nationality
- Nation, Religion, King
- Melayu Islam Beraja
- Le Roi, la Loi, la Liberté
