= Travail, famille, patrie =

Official motto of Vichy France

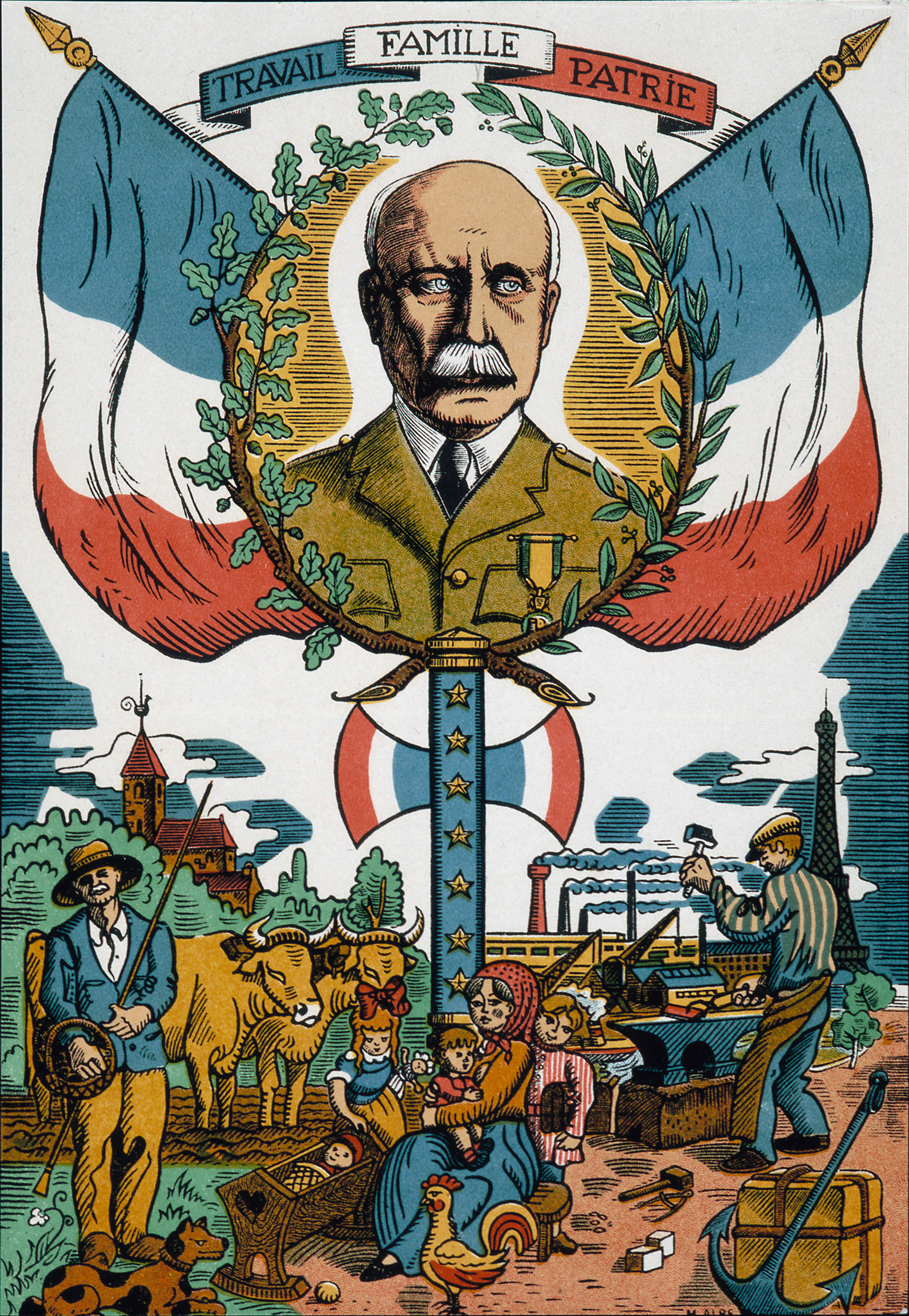
A 1942 Vichy regime propaganda image, with the motto and Philippe Pétain above a scene of rural and urban France.

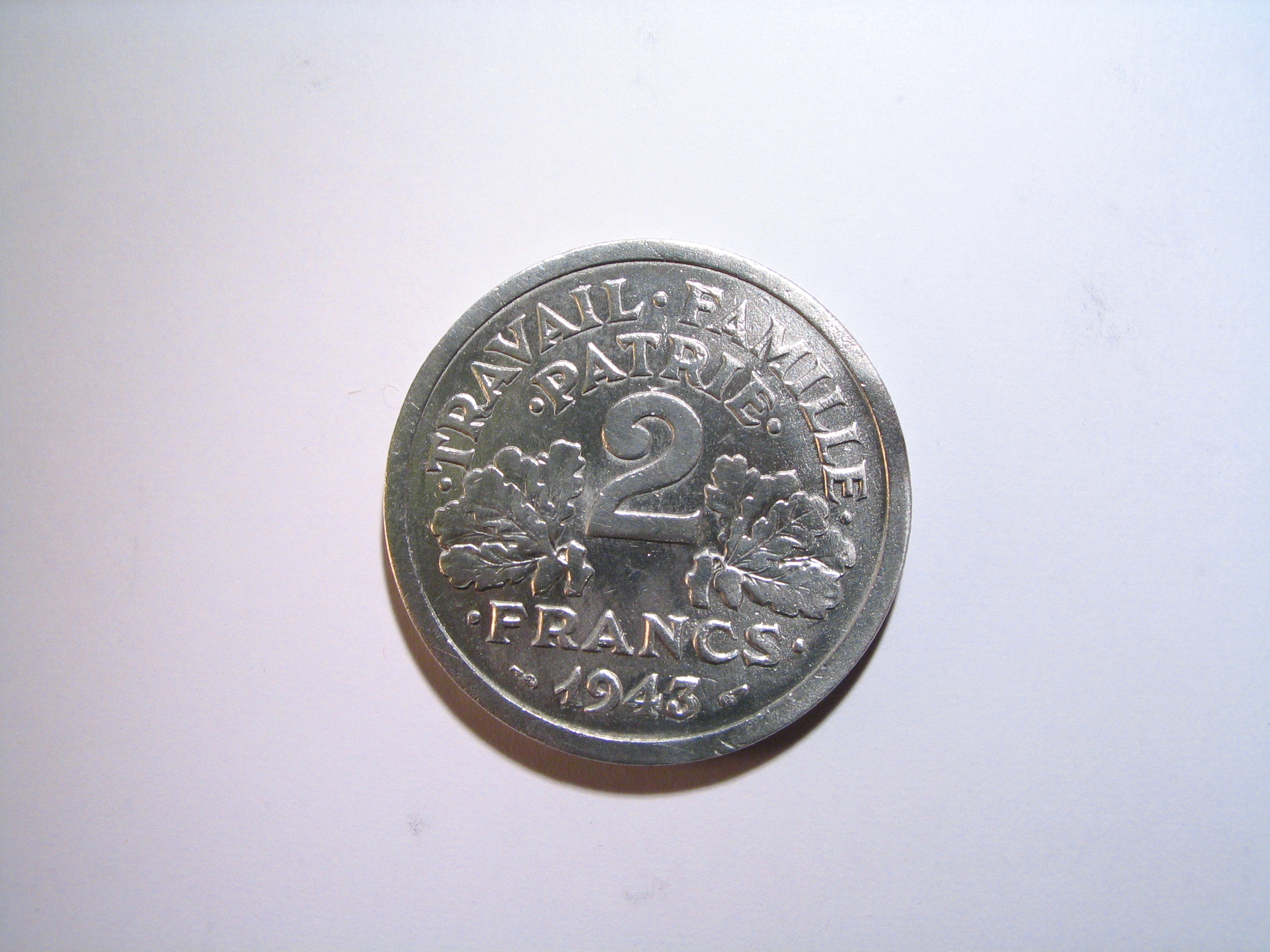
The reverse of the two franc coin of 1943, on which the motto appears.

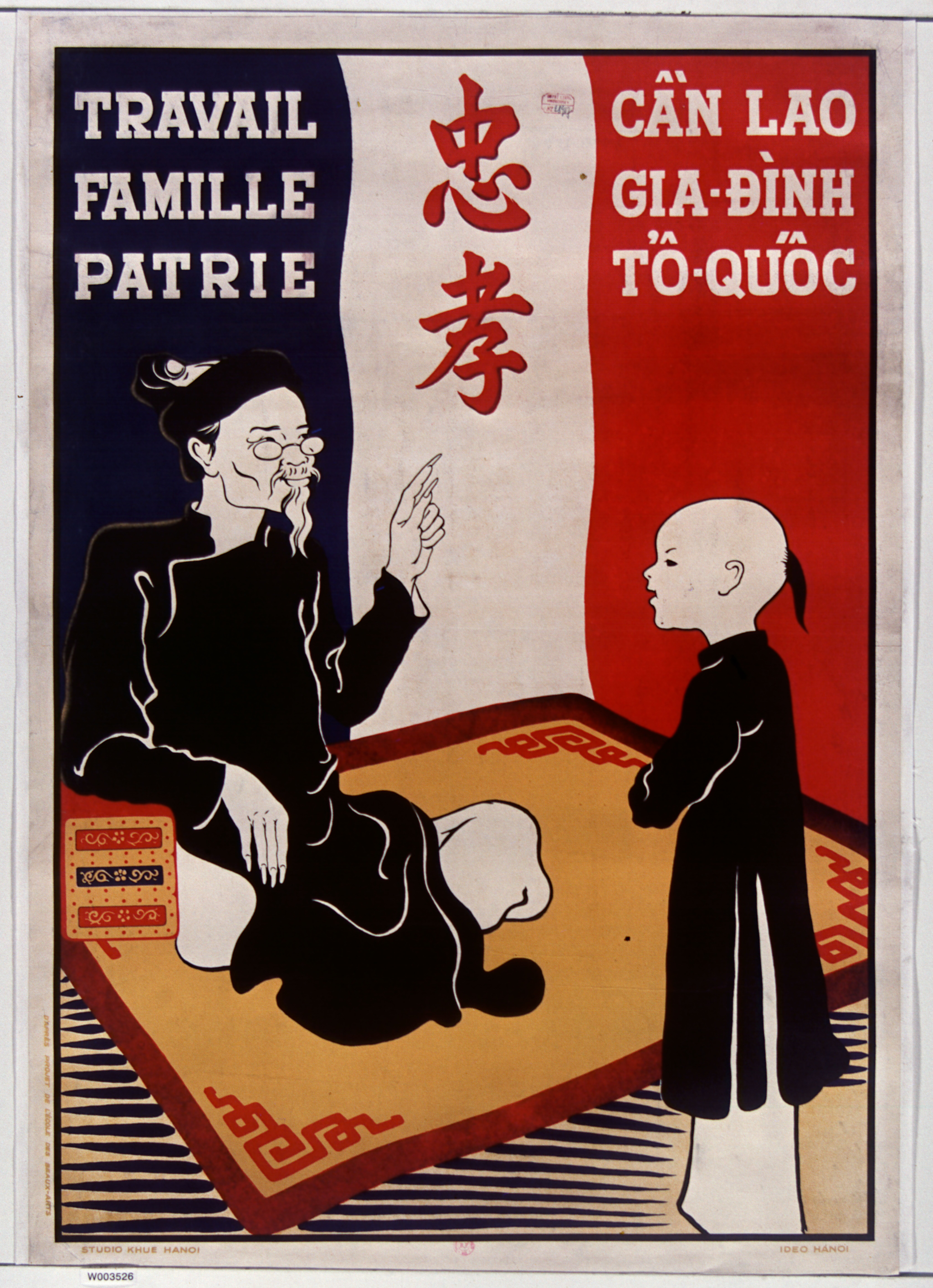
The new motto was also used in the colonies, such as this Vietnamese-language image from French Indochina. The central Chữ Nôm characters are 忠孝 (trung hiếu), "loyalty to the state and filial piety."

Travail, famille, patrie (Note: IPA: [tʁa.vaj | fa.mij | pa.tʁi]; lit. 'Work, family, fatherland') (Work, family, fatherland) was the tripartite motto of Vichy France during World War II. It had replaced the republican motto Liberté, égalité, fraternité (freedom, equality, brotherhood) of the Third French Republic. (Note: France has a written constitution so that each time political pressures are such as to require its radical rewriting, the new system is given a new name. The current constitution is that of the Fifth Republic but there have been two empires, a consulate and a state. In the same way, Germany had used the term Reich ('State'). Under the conditions of 1940, this appears to have influenced the choice of the equivalent French term État. The then current Reich was the third one.)

== Institution ==
The Law of 10 July 1940 gave Marshal Pétain full powers to draw up a constitution before being submitted to the Nation and guaranteeing "the rights of Labour, of the Family and of the Fatherland". That constitution was never promulgated.

In the Revue des deux Mondes (Two Worlds Magazine) of 15 September 1940, Marshal Pétain wrote this repudiation of the motto of the French Republic. Liberté, Égalité, Fraternité : When our young people […] approach adult life, we shall say to them […] that real liberty cannot be exercised except under the shelter of a guiding authority, which they must respect, which they must obey […]. We shall then tell them that equality [should] set itself within the framework of a hierarchy, founded on the diversity of office and merits. […] Finally, we shall tell them that there is no way of having true brotherhood except within those natural groups, the family, the town, the fatherland.

The motto Travail, Famille, Patrie was originally that of the Croix-de-Feu, then of the Parti social français (PSF or French Social Party) founded by Colonel de La Rocque.

It has often been written that these three words express the Révolution nationale (RN), the National Revolution undertaken by the Vichy regime.

== Travail ==
On 24 April 1941, Marshal Pétain officially inaugurated 1 May as the fête du Travail et de la Concorde sociale, the day on which labour and social harmony were celebrated.

The regime won over some trades unionists for the drawing up of a Labour Charter. In it, they declared themselves as being against both capitalism and Marxism. The regime advocated the finding of a third way.

On 14 March 1941 the Vichy Government set up a retirement system, the allowance for old, waged workers. The new system renewed the old contribution-based retirement system, which had been devalued by inflation and extraordinary expenses.

== Famille ==
The regime wrote Mothers’ Day into the calendar. With regard to the family, there had been continuity rather than a break with the family policy of the period of the Daladier government, which continued through the Pétain years and would later continue in the Fourth Republic.

== Patrie ==
The nationalism of Pétain, who saw himself as maintaining the tradition of the victorious nationalism of 1918, did not stop his collaborating with the Nazi regime. Until he died, he kept a certain degree of Germanophobia of the sort expressed by Charles Maurras. He had no pro-German or anti-British record from before the war. Several times, he restated that he regarded himself as the ally and friend of Great Britain. In his broadcast of 23 June 1940, he reproached Winston Churchill for the speech made by Churchill on 22 June 1940, following the signing of the armistice on that day.

== See also ==
- List of political slogans
- Liberté, Égalité, Fraternité, motto of the French Republic.
- La Nation, la Loi, le Roi, motto of the constitutional Kingdom of France
- Salazar's Estado Novo's motto Deus, Pátria e Família
