= Nation, Religion, King =

National motto of Cambodia and unofficial motto of Thailand

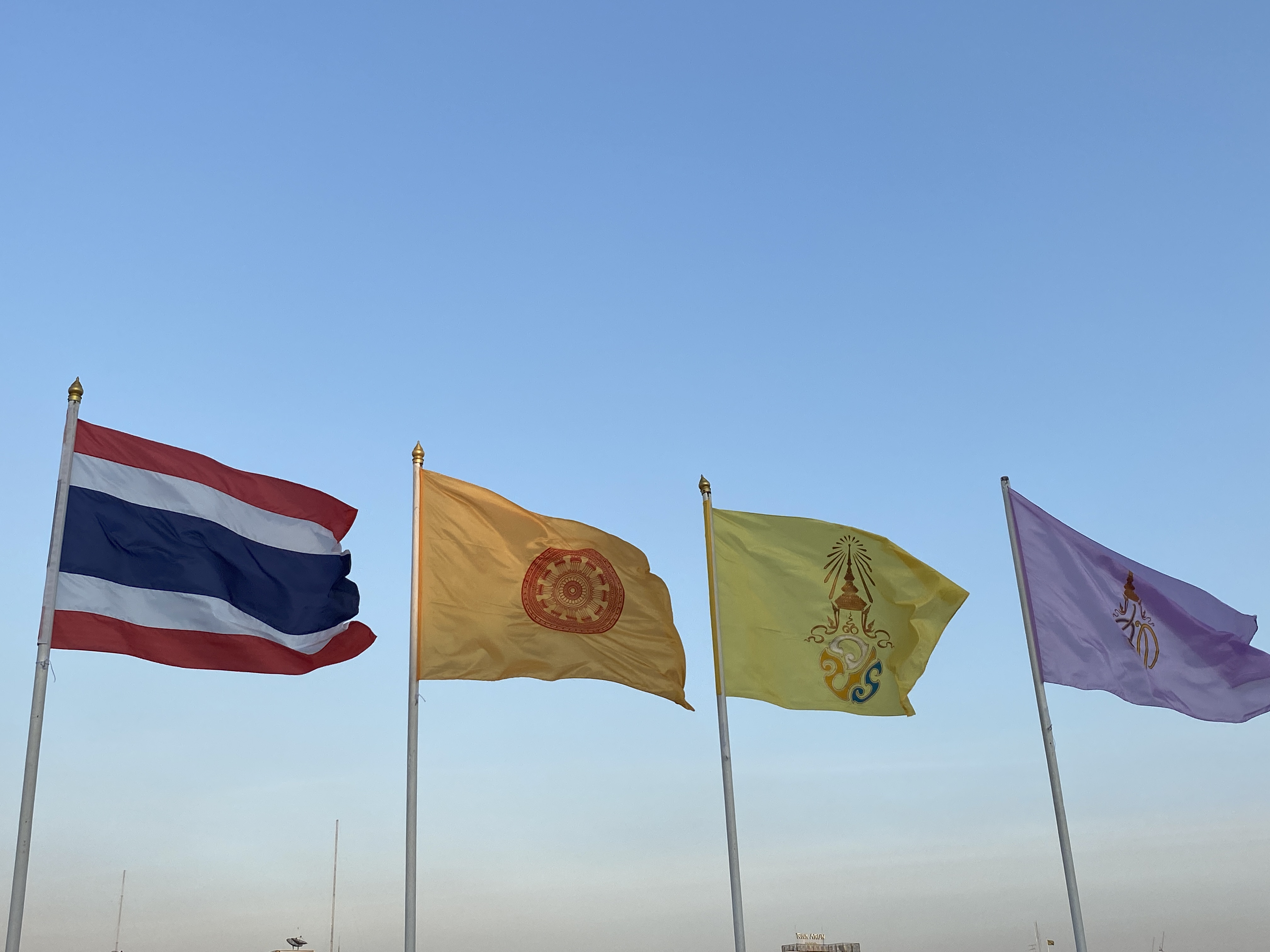
The three colours of the Flag of Thailand represent Nation, Religion and King.

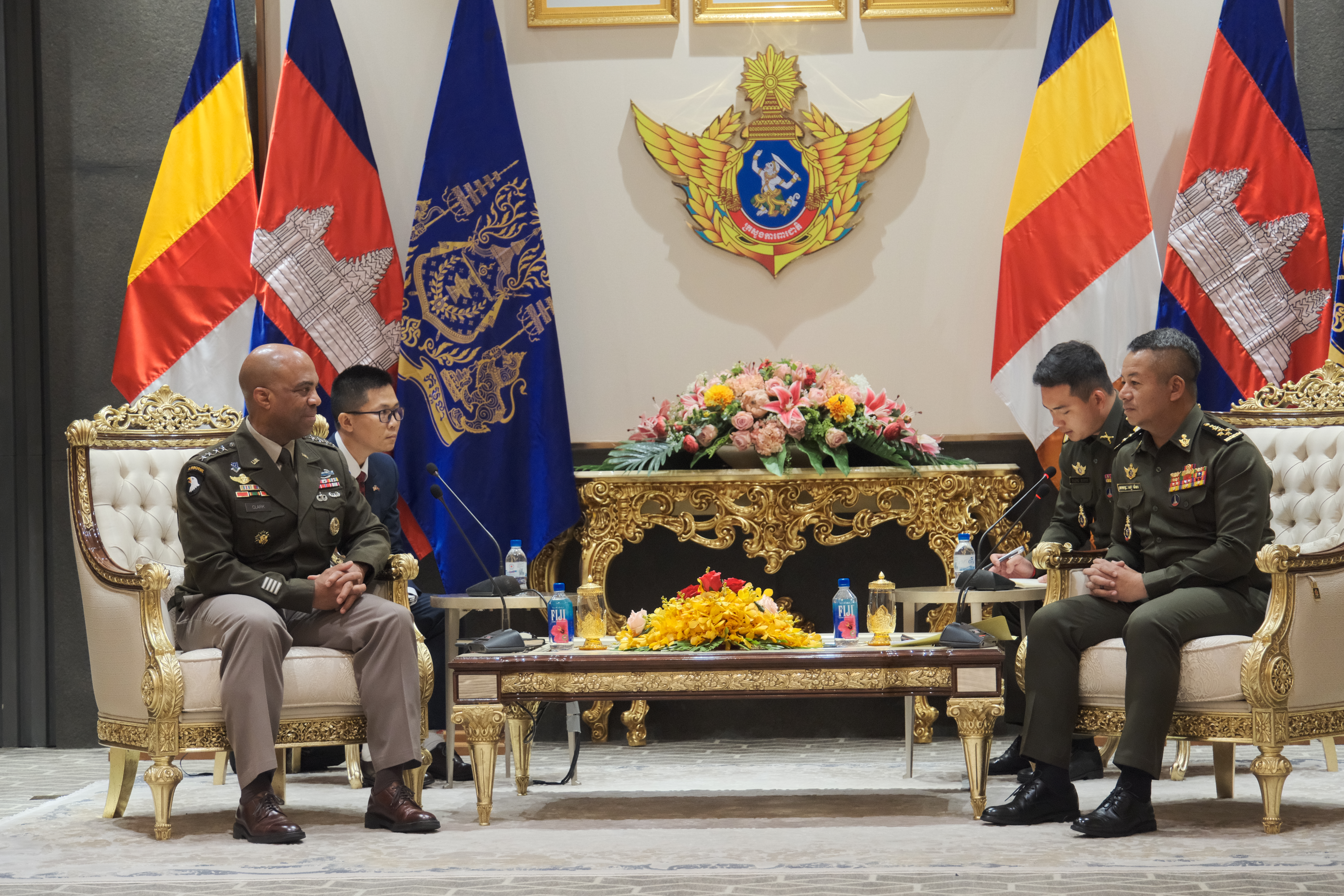
A standard Cambodian authorities' decoration with the Buddhist flag, the national flag and the Royal Standard of Cambodia.

Nation, Religion, King (Khmer: ជាតិ សាសនា ព្រះមហាក្សត្រ, UNGEGN: Chéatĕ, Sasânéa, Preăh Môhaksâtr; Thai: ชาติ ศาสนา พระมหากษัตริย์, RTGS: Chat, Satsana, Phra Mahakasat) is a motto and classic hendiatris which serves as an official motto of Cambodia and an unofficial but de facto motto of Thailand.

== History ==
The Thai slogan, "Chat, Satsana, Phramahakasat" was created by King Vajiravudh (Rama VI, reigned 1910-1925) at the beginning of the 20th century. It echoes La Nation, la Loi, le Roi (English: “The Nation, the Law, the King”) which was the national motto of France during the constitutional period of the French monarchy. After being educated at Sandhurst School during the rise of nationalism in Europe before World War I, the Thai King may have blended modern Western notions of nationalism with older, indigenous symbols of kingship and the Shangha to encourage national loyalty. During the 1933 Boworadet Rebellion, official propaganda modified the nationalist motto into Nation, Religion, King and Constitution as the four pillars of Siamese unity and independence.

The earliest record of this phrase in Cambodia appears in the preface to the Cultural Committee's serial of world lists carried in the Khmer-language Kambuja Suryia in 1949, but most decisively, Khmer novelist Nhok Them popularized the triad with his 1950 book, Nation, Religion, King. Nhok Them had studied in Thailand from 1918 to 1930 in the reign of Rama VI, perhaps explaining the translation of the notion, although he never refers to it as of Thai origin in his work. By 1960, it had become a way to summarize the fundamental values of Cambodian culture, with the Teacher Training Center in Kampong Kantuot making a short film entitled "The 3 Pillars of Cambodian Strength: Church, Throne and Nation", supported of the United States Information Service, and inspired by a triad formulated by Sinologist Edward Harper Parker.

From 1958 to 1963, Royal Thai Army chief Sarit Thanarat suspended the constitution, dissolved parliament, and banned political parties, using the motto Nation, Religion, King but adding, first and foremost, faithfulness to the government. However, in the 1970s the Thai extreme right-wing Buddhist and anti-Communist organisation Nawaphon saw itself as "the only group that [was] ready and able to defend the nation, the satsana, and the king."

In 1984, David K. Wyatt attempted to explain this motto by referring to it as a "trinitarian mystery in which all three elements were inextricably bound together".

Benedict Anderson compares it with the Tsarist Russian shibboleth of “Orthodoxy, Autocracy, and Nationality”, "an anticipatory strategy adopted by dominant dynastic groups which are threatened with marginalization or exclusion from an emerging nationally-imagined community."

The Cambodian Constitution of December 1993 integrated Nation, Religion, King as the official motto of the restored monarchy in its fourth article. It in fact matched the "three constants of post-Angkorian Cambodian political history, namely, the Buddhist monarchy, the Theravada Sangha (community of monks), and the village-based society of ethnic lowland Khmer".

== Illustration ==
The Nation, Religion, King motto is often represented by the flags of Thailand and Cambodia.

In Cambodia, the motto is reflected in the order of the three national flags of Cambodia that must be raised in all public spaces as reminded in official government directives, with the national flag in the central most important position, then the Buddhist flag and finally the royal standard.

More symbolically in Thailand, the colours of the flag of Thailand are said to stand for nation-religion-king, an unofficial motto of Thailand, red for Thai ethnicity, white for religions and blue for the monarchy, the last having been the auspicious colour of Rama VI.

== See also ==
- Orthodoxy, Autocracy, and Nationality – Ideological doctrine of Nicholas I of Russia
- Melayu, Islam, Beraja – State ideology of Brunei
- Pro aris et focis – also “Pro Deo et Patria”, older Latin twofold formulae with similar connotations
