= Orthodoxy, Autocracy, and Nationality =

Ideological doctrine of Nicholas I of Russia

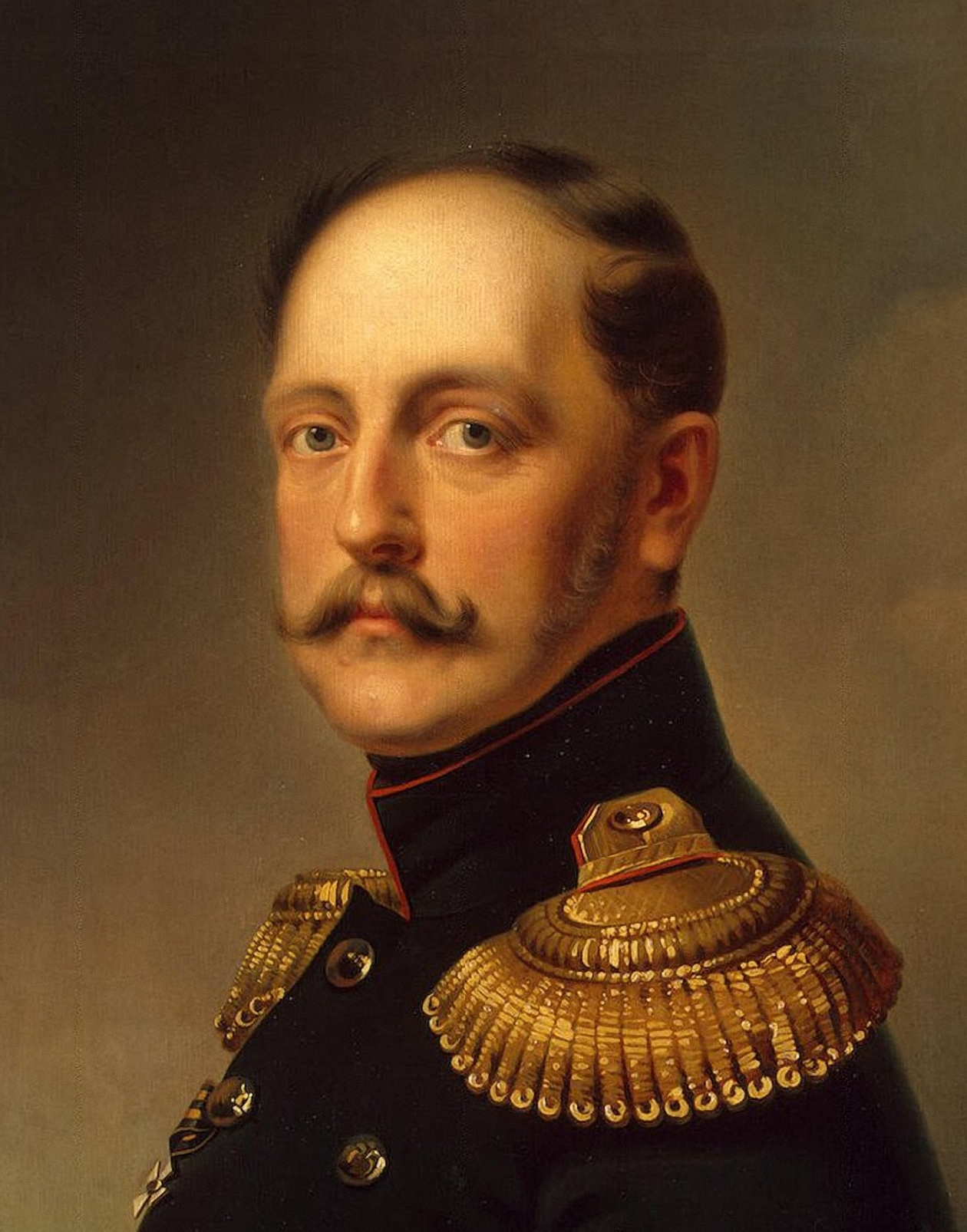
Nicholas I made Orthodoxy, Autocracy, and Nationality the main ideological doctrine of his reign from 1825 to 1855.

Orthodoxy, Autocracy, and Nationality (Russian: Правосла́вие, самодержа́вие, наро́дность; transliterated: Pravoslávie, samoderzhávie, naródnost'), also known as Official Nationalism, was the dominant Imperial ideological doctrine of Russian Emperor Nicholas I. The doctrine sought Imperial unity under Eastern Orthodoxy and the absolute authority of the Emperor, while suppressing ideas deemed destructive to that unity. It followed a broader European reactionary trend that sought to restore and defend political institutions that were overthrown in the Napoleonic Wars.

"The Triad" of Official Nationality was originally proposed by Minister of Education Sergey Uvarov in his 2 April 1833, circular letter to subordinate educators. It was soon embraced by Nicholas and his establishment and gained wide public recognition, vocally supported by intellectuals like Mikhail Pogodin, Fyodor Tyutchev, and Nikolai Gogol.

Critics of the policy saw this principle as a call for Russification. Yet the very fact of its existence, being Russia's first statewide political ideology since the 16th century, indicated the nation's brewing transition to modernity.

== Quest for ideology ==
Nicholas I emerged as the Emperor in the wake of the Decembrist revolt; subsequent investigation proved that disloyalty was deeply rooted within the noble estate—the sole foundation of the House of Romanov. His father and grandfather were killed by their own guards and statesmen in palace coups. Keen to eradicate the rebels and ensure his own physical security, Nicholas carefully studied proceedings of the Decembrists' investigation and was aware of defects in his predecessor's government that fueled the mutiny. "In one sense, the reign of Nicholas I was a protracted epilogue to the Decembrist rising."

Nicholas, acting in line with his absolutist predecessors of the Age of Enlightenment, developed a state education system and completed codification of the law. He installed a highly regulated but ultimately inefficient government system of "anxious centralization", himself being the chief arbiter between rivalling statesmen. The system created by Nicolas I was unsound and ineffective since the Emperor could not personally oversee all state business and review all papers to be signed.

The Emperor found himself a prisoner of his own system, so he could only rely on his high officials in most of his day-to-day activity. Higher officials relied on officials of lower rank. In most cases government officials, even ministers, did things on their own and paid little attention to general instructions given by the Emperor in one case or another.

The autocracy was exploited by government officials (chinovniki) for their own benefit. The autocracy in fact turned out to be a cover to hide the acts made by officials at all levels. Back in those days, it was chinovniki who had real power, but not the Emperor, who was nothing more but a promulgator of laws. Nevertheless, if a certain law was not lucrative or was disadvantageous for government officials, it was not a problem to make legal obstacles to enforce such law.

Sometimes a law was simply abolished without the Emperor knowing about it, as it was usually the case with the Emperor’s acts regulating commercial activity of Saint Petersburg negotiants (kuptsy). In any case, the Emperor always got a report that everything went well and all his instructions had been implemented. But he also attributed the nobles' disloyalty to a Europe-wide conspiracy aimed at destroying ruling monarchies, religion, and morale. Russia, according to his point of view, succeeded in the Napoleonic Wars while more advanced regimes failed, saving Europe from plunging into decay and atheism.

== Forging the triad ==
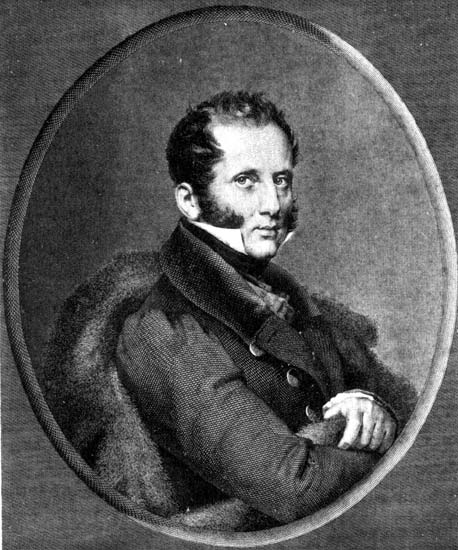
Sergey Uvarov in the 1830s. Engraving by Nikolai Utkin.

Sergey Uvarov, Minister of Education and President of the Russian Academy of Sciences since 1818, was also a writer, a scholar and at times was considered a freethinker. Yet, with a change in domestic politics, he easily adjusted to a tightened regime. In 1833 Uvarov forged the Emperor's program into a brief statement of ideology:

It is our common obligation to ensure that the education of the people be conducted, according to Supreme intention of our August Monarch, in the joint spirit of Orthodoxy, Autocracy and Nationality. I am convinced that every professor and teacher, being permeated by one and the same feeling of devotion to the throne and fatherland, will use all his resources to become a worthy tool for the government and to earn its complete confidence.

Tsar Nicholas I had remembered the Decembrist revolt for all his life. He always suspected secret societies and uprisings to be plotted around him. Such personal feelings of the Tsar had great influence on the development of Russia. In order to meet the demands of the new state of affairs under Nicholas I, the Minister of Public Education S. Uvarov proposed to give new original shape to the national educational system.

He said that Russia needs such educational system which could produce skilled, professional, well prepared executors of the Emperor’s wishes. Such an educational system should not only provide knowledge to people, but also made them unconditionally loyal to the Emperor. Briefly speaking, Uvarov tried to deprive education of its most important integral part: an analytical and critical approach to an environment (specifically to the political environment).

According to Uvarov's theory, the Russian folk (narod) were very religious and devoted to the Emperor, the Orthodox religion, and autocracy as unconditional bases of the existence of Russia. Narodnost (nationality) is deemed to be the necessity to follow independent national traditions and to fight foreign influence. The theory stated that it was necessary to reject western ideas—freedom of thinking, freedom of personality, individualism, and rationalism—which were considered by Orthodox hierarchs as dangerous and rebellious. The chief of Russian political police (the III Department of His Majesty's Personal Chancellery) A. Benckendorff wrote that "the past of Russia was wonderful, the present is splendid and the future is above all dreams". These three concepts were considered as "pillar-walls" of the Russian Empire. Uvarov's triad was the first explicit statement of government ideology in Russian history since the 16th century.

He repeated the triad and elaborated on the topic throughout the 16 years of his ministry and was eventually awarded the title of a count. "Orthodoxy, Autocracy, and Nationality" became the Uvarov family motto, decreed by Nicholas. Yet he also did much as a true educator, raising educational standards, establishing new colleges, and increasing the number of scholarships for overseas training. Under Uvarov, the "Russian educational system, with all its fundamental flaws, came to emphasise academic thoroughness and high standards", although it also became more exclusive at all levels.

== Components ==
The three components of Uvarov's triad were

- Orthodoxy: Eastern Orthodoxy and the protection of the Russian Orthodox Church.
- Autocracy: unconditional loyalty to the House of Romanov in return for paternalist protection for all social estates.
- Nationality: Narodnost can be defined as "fidelity to Russia's distinct cultural heritage" and deference to "aspirations of the common people". It has been also translated as national spirit, and populism. Before its adoption by Nicholas I, narodnost was a central tenet of Russian Romantic writers, the Russian expression of a principle more often called Romantic nationalism.

The sequence of three parts of the triad remained fixed in all circumstances even when the words themselves changed: military cadets were instructed to be "Christians, loyal subjects, and Russians"; the common public motto called "For Faith, Tsar and Fatherland".

The triad was inherently unbalanced in favor of centralized autocracy. The Russian Orthodox Church was impoverished and incapable of being an independent political force. The government remained wary of any philosophy, including theology. Nationality through empowerment of the people was not a choice from the start and became even less probable after the dreaded nationalist Revolutions of 1848 "reduced Nicholas to a state of almost catatonic fear". It also ran against the ever-increasing role of Baltic Germans in the government system; even converted to Orthodoxy, they retained their distinct ethnicity.

== Public reception ==
The press, censored by the state, eagerly embraced the new doctrine and was dominated by it until the end of Nicholas's reign. Stepan Shevyryov, editor of Moskvityanin magazine, asserted that "even if we did pick certain unavoidable blemishes from the West, we have on the other hand preserved in ourselves, in their purity, three fundamental feelings which contain the seed and guarantee of our future development."

Slavophiles, in particular, accepted the anti-European, paternalistic aspect of the doctrine. Mikhail Pogodin explained the paternalistic, peaceful nature of autocracy as seen by Slavophiles: "the secret of Russian history, the secret which not a single Western sage is able to comprehend: Russian history always depicts Russia as a single family in which the ruler is the father and the subjects are children. The father retains full authority over children while he allows them to have full freedom ... there can be no suspicion, no treason; their fate, their happiness, their peace they share in common. This is true in relation to the state as a whole..."

Nikolai Nadezhdin, who initially entertained the Westernised, Schellingian notion of nationality, radically changed his mind in favor of Official Nationality in the wake of the Chaadayev affair (1837), writing that "nationality had always consisted of love of the Tsar and obedience, and which in the future should display in itself, to Europe's dismay, a brilliant lesson of how from the holy unity of autocracy, must arise an exemplary and splendid national enlightenment...".

Nikolai Gogol in his final work Selected Passages from Correspondence with His Friends (1847) extended Official Nationality to relationships between landlords and serfs: "Make them [serfs] see clearly that in everything that concerns them you are acting in accordance with the will of God and not in accordance with some European or other fancies on your own."

== Comparisons to Putinism ==
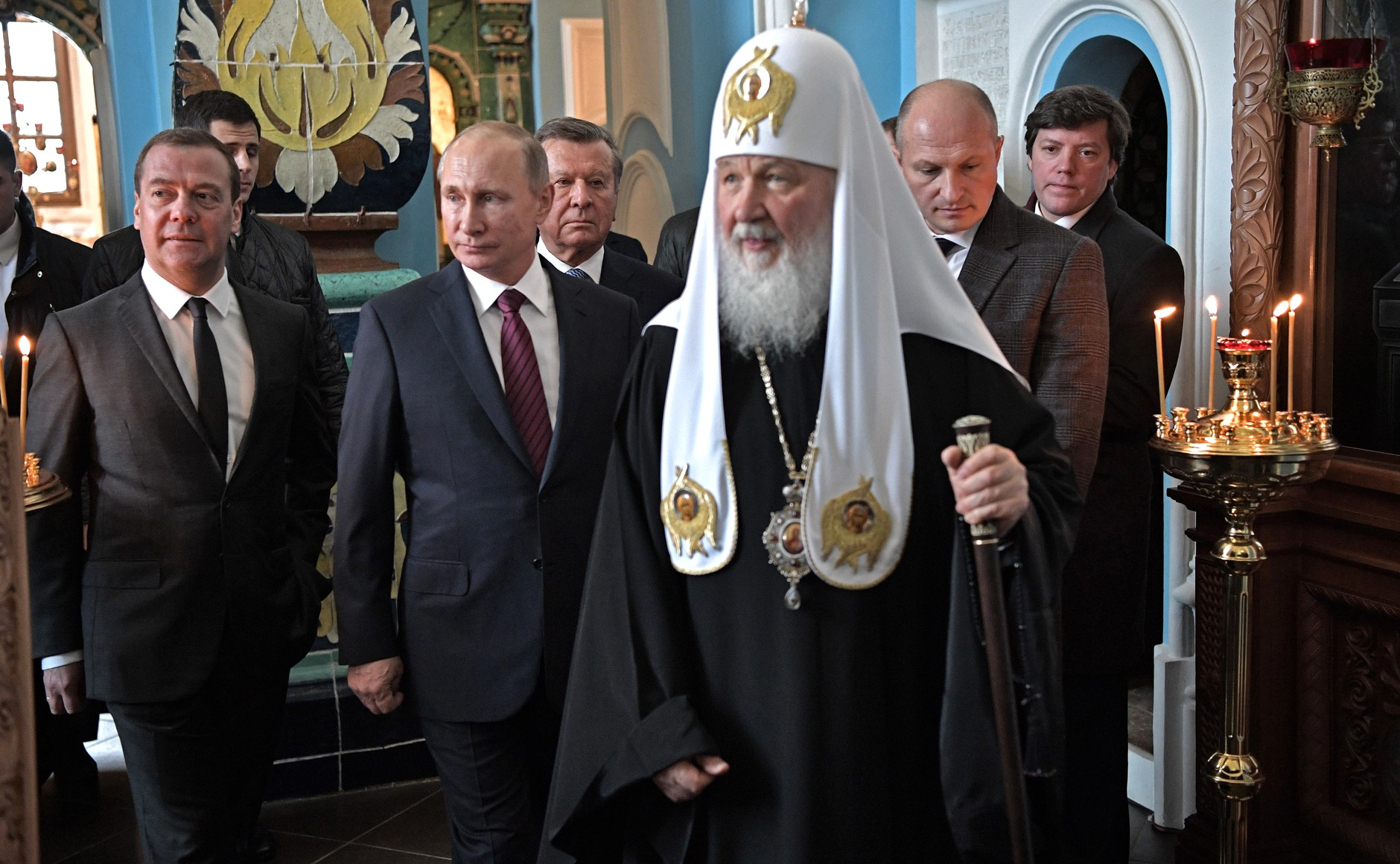
Vladimir Putin and Patriarch Kirill

A number of commentators have compared the ideology of Vladimir Putin, who has frequently been described as the de facto leader of Russian since 1999, to the doctrine of Orthodoxy, Autocracy, and Nationality. Faith Hillis of the University of Chicago has argued that Putin "wants to reconstitute the Russian Empire and its guiding ideologies, which were orthodoxy, autocracy and nationality—except now, under the power of a very sophisticated police state." A 2014 paper in the Journal of Eurasian Studies argued that "Putin has emphasized patriotism, power, and statism to justify centralization of power and authoritarian policies. Putin's policies and rhetoric are strong analogs to those of Nicholas." Stan Grant of Charles Sturt University has argued that it "remains Putin's vision today. The church and the state are inseparable. The head of Russian Orthodoxy, Patriarch Kirill, has called Putin 'a miracle of God'." Foreign Policy journalist Michael Hirsh has stated that the policy "isn’t mentioned in Putin’s speeches and writings—he still likes to pretend Russia is a democracy—but it has been invoked by the far-right thinkers said to influence Putin, including Aleksandr Dugin, Lev Gumilev, Igor Shafarevich, Ivan Ilyin, Konstantin Leontiev, Sergei Petrovich Trubetskoy, and others dating back 200 years."

== See also ==
- God, Honour, Fatherland
- Liberté, égalité, fraternité
- Melayu, Islam, Beraja
- Nation, Religion, King

== General sources ==
- Hoffmann, David Lloyd; Kotsonis, Yanni (2000). Russian modernity: politics, knowledge, practices. Palgrave Macmillan. ISBN 978-0-312-22599-5.
- Hosking, Geoffrey (1998). Russia: people and empire, 1552-1917. Harvard University Press. p. 146. ISBN 978-0-674-78119-1. "Orthodoxy, Autocracy, and Nationality."
- Riasanovsky, Nicholas V. (2005). Russian identities: a historical survey. Oxford University Press US. ISBN 978-0-19-515650-8.
- Uvarov's report (in Russian)
