= Hendiatris =

Figure of speech using three words for one idea

Hendiatris (/hɛnˈdaɪ.ətrɪs/ hen-DY-ət-riss; from Ancient Greek ἓν διὰ τρία (hèn dià tría) 'one through three') is a figure of speech used for emphasis, in which three words are used to express one idea. The phrases "sun, sea and sand", and "wine, women and song" are examples.

A tripartite motto is the conventional English term for a motto, a slogan, or an advertising phrase in the form of a hendiatris. Some well-known examples are the formula "Life, Liberty, and the pursuit of Happiness" from the United States Declaration of Independence, Jesus Christ's "the way, the truth, and the life" and Julius Caesar's Veni, vidi, vici (examples of a tricolon); and the motto of the French Republic: Liberté, Égalité, Fraternité; the phrase peace, order and good government is used as a guiding principle in the parliaments of the Commonwealth of Nations.

== In the ancient and classical world ==
In rhetorical teaching, such triple iterations marked the classic rhythm of Ciceronian style, typified by the triple rhetorical questions of his first Oration Against Catiline:

Quo usque tandem abutere, Catilina, patientia nostra? Quamdiu etiam furor iste tuus nos eludet? Quem ad finem sese effrenata jactabit audacia?

Translation:

Until when will you abuse our patience, Catiline? For how long will that madness of yours mock us? To what end will your unbridled boldness toss itself about?

In ancient Greece and Rome, such abstractions as liberty and justice were theologized (cf. triple deity). Hence the earliest tripartite mottoes are lists of the names of goddesses: Eunomia, Dike, and Eirene. These late Greek goddesses, respectively Good Order, Justice, and Peace were collectively referred to by the Romans as the Horae. The Romans had Concordia, Salus, and Pax, collectively called the Fortunae. The names of these mean Harmony, Health, and Peace.

== In Shakespeare ==
- "Cry God for Harry, England and St. George" (Henry V)
- "Friends, Romans, countrymen, lend me your ears" (Julius Caesar)
- "Be bloody, bold, and resolute" (Macbeth)
- "Love all, trust a few. Do wrong to none." (All's well that ends well)
- "Serve God, love me, and mend." (Much Ado About Nothing)

== Since the Renaissance and the Enlightenment ==
From the 18th century, the tripartite motto was primarily political. John Locke's Life, Liberty, and Property was adapted by Thomas Jefferson when he wrote the United States Declaration of Independence into Life, liberty, and the pursuit of happiness, which has become the American equivalent of the French triad listed above.

The initial Carlist motto was God, Country, King.

The dominant ideology of Tsar Nicholas I of Russia was frequently expressed in the tripartite motto, "Orthodoxy, autocracy and nationality" (Russian: правосла́вие, самодержа́вие, наро́дность, romanized: pravoslávie, samoderzhávie, naródnost').

The policy French: Un Roi, une Loi, une Foi, lit. 'One King, one Law, one Faith' was the political and religious vision of absolute monarchy in early modern France, particularly during the reign of Louis XIV. It reflects the desire for centralized authority and unity under the monarch, where the king's power is supreme, the law is uniform across the kingdom, and religious unity under Catholicism is enforced.

The University of North Carolina's Dialectic and Philanthropic Societies maintain such tripartite mottos as well. The Philanthropic Society's motto is Virtus, Libertas, et Scientia "Virtue, Liberty, and Knowledge" and the Joint Senate motto is Ad Virtutem, Libertatem, Scientiamque "Toward Virtue, Liberty, and Knowledge".

== Modern usages ==
A Canadian usage is Peace, order and good government, originally found in the 1867 Constitution of Canada. It has remained, to this day, an essential part of the Canadian identity.

"Il nous faut de l'audace, encore de l'audace, toujours de l'audace!" 'We must be bold, and again bold, and forever bold!' Georges Danton.

Lenin and the Bolsheviks adopted a tripartite motto for the Russian Revolution, Russian: мир, земля, и хлеб, romanized: mir, zemlya, i khleb, lit. 'Peace, Land, and Bread.'

During the New Deal, the projects of Franklin Delano Roosevelt were summed up as Relief, Recovery, and Reform.

The form was used by fascist parties: Fascist Italy's Credere! Obbedire! Combattere! 'Believe! Obey! Fight!'; the Nazi Ein Volk! Ein Reich! Ein Führer! 'One people! One state! One leader!'.

During the German occupation of France, the Vichy regime replaced the motto of the Republic by Travail, Famille, Patrie (Work, Family, Fatherland).

The motto for Spain, Una, Grande y Libre ('Unitary, Great, and Free').

The modern motto of Germany: "Einigkeit und Recht und Freiheit" (Unity and Justice and Freedom) is inscribed on the side of German two euro coins, as it was on Deutsche Mark coins.

The main slogan of Greek junta in Greek: Πατρίς, Θρησκεία, Οικογένεια, romanized: Patris Thriskia Oikogeneia, lit. 'Fatherland, Faith, Family'.

Given by Muhammad Ali Jinnah, founder of Pakistan, Faith, Unity, Discipline (Urdu: ایمان، اتحاد، نظم, romanized: Īmān, Ittiḥād, Naẓm) is the national motto of Pakistan.

Such mnemonics have also drawn suspicion from more nuanced thinkers; in George Orwell's novel Nineteen Eighty-Four, the novel's totalitarian regime used "War is Peace, Freedom is Slavery, Ignorance is Strength" to exhort the subjects of Oceania to fear any apparent opportunities for personal agency.

The motto of the Reorganized National Government of the Republic of China, a Japanese puppet regime, was "Peace, Anti-Communism, National Construction".

The 1974 Carnation Revolution in Portugal aimed at three immediate goals: "Descolonização, Democratização, Desenvolvimento" 'decolonization, democratization, development'.

The US Federal Bureau of Investigation has an initialistic motto: "Fidelity, Bravery, Integrity", while the United States Military Academy at West Point has "Duty, Honor, Country". This concept has been extended to the list of core values of the U.S. armed services, such as the Navy's "Honor, Courage, Commitment" and the Coast Guard's "Honor, Respect, Devotion to Duty".

The University of Notre Dame has adopted "God, Country, Notre Dame" as an informal motto. The phrase first appeared on the First World War memorial located on the east portico of the basilica.

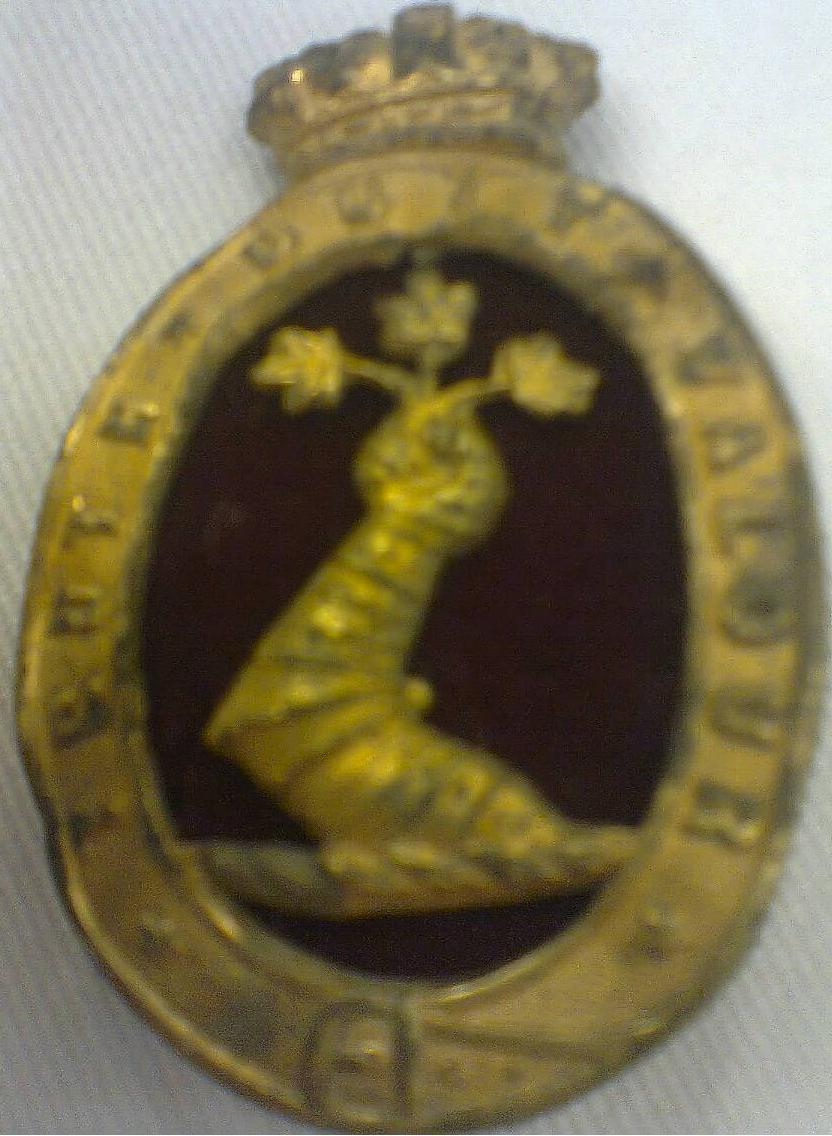
Royal Military College of Canada gilt and red velvet Victorian-era pin ("Truth, Duty, Valour")

The Royal Military College of Canada has followed the tripartite motto "Truth, Duty, Valour" since the founding of the College in 1876. This motto was expanded into the Canadian Forces' core values.

Very often triple mottoes derive from a turn of oratory in a speech; for example Abraham Lincoln's "of the people, by the people, for the people" in his Gettysburg Address and "Segregation now, segregation tomorrow, segregation forever" in George Wallace's 1963 Inaugural Address.

These are common throughout Western civilization, but also appear in other cultures. The Japanese said that during their boom years, illegal immigrants performed the work that was "dangerous, difficult, (and/or) dirty" (Japanese: きつい、汚い、危険, Kitsui, kitanai, kiken). Dravidian parties in southern India use the motto "Duty, Dignity and Discipline" (in Tamil: கடமை, கண்ணியம், கட்டுப்பாடு). The proponents of Manding social reformation and the N'Ko language education in West Africa use the hendiatris motto "to be savvy, to work, to be just" (N'Ko: ߞߊ߬ ߞߏߟߐ߲߫߸ ߞߊ߬ ߓߊ߯ߙߊ߫߸ ߞߊ߬ ߕߋߟߋ߲߫, kà kólɔn, kà báara, kà télen).

The form is so well known that it can be played upon, as in the three requisites of real estate ("Location, Location, Location"), and similarly with Tony Blair stating his priorities as a political leader to be "education, education and education".

In German society, the tripartite motto Kinder, Küche, Kirche (children, kitchen, church) was first a late-19th-century slogan.

One of the unofficial mottoes of Yale University is "For God, for country, and for Yale", which appears as the last line of the university's alma mater, Bright College Years. Yale historian George W. Pierson has also described Yale as "at once a tradition, a company of scholars, a society of friends".

A commonly used patriotic slogan in Poland is Bóg, Honor, Ojczyzna (lit. “God, Honour, Fatherland”).

The motto of the Afghan National Army is خدا، وطن، وظیفه (lit. "God, Homeland, Duty").

Featured in the 2004 American cult classic film, 13 Going on 30, starring Jennifer Garner, "Thirty, flirty, and thriving", is used to express the idea of optimistic prosperity, in the wake of commonplace insecurities faced by many young adults, in their teens and twenties.

In the Kendrick Lamar song "The Recipe", the hendiatris of "women, weed, and weather" describes "what represents L.A.," according to Dr. Dre, who appears on the song.

A commonly used slogan used in propaganda by the Chinese Communist Party during the Mao era is "Great, Glorious, and Correct". After disappearing for decades after the reform and opening up, a resurgence of usage of the figure of speech can be observed under the general secretaryship of Xi Jinping.

== Examples ==
- "Citius, Altius, Fortius" ("Faster, higher, stronger") is the official Olympic motto
- "Every Tom, Dick and Harry"
- "Faith, hope, and charity"
- "Game, set, and match"
- "Gold, frankincense and myrrh", the Biblical gifts of the Magi
- "God, family, and country"
- "God, mother, and apple pie"
- "Hook, line, and sinker"
- "In no way, shape, or form"
- "Life, liberty and the pursuit of happiness"
- "Live, laugh, love"
- "Lock, stock, and barrel" (this is also a merism, denoting a thing by enumerating its parts)
- "Métro, boulot, dodo" (subway/underground, work, sleep), a French expression popularly used to describe the dreary daily routine of working Parisians, and the source of many imitative expressions.
- “Morning, noon, and night”
- "Reading, writing, and arithmetic"
- "Reduce, reuse, recycle"
- "Rum, sodomy and the lash", a characterization of Royal Navy tradition attributed (probably falsely) to Winston Churchill, which was used by The Pogues for the title of their second album (1985).
- "Truth, justice, and the American way", the causes for which Superman fights, according to the opening of the television series Adventures of Superman
- ”Vita, Dulcedo, Spes” (found in the Salve Regina; means "Life, Sweetness, Hope" in English)
- "Virtue, liberty, and independence"
- "Wine, women and song", a phrase of Johann Heinrich Voss (1751–1826), and its modern variant "Sex, drugs, and rock'n'roll"
- Women, Fire, and Dangerous Things, a book by cognitive linguist George Lakoff on categorization and metaphor
- "Honour, Pride, Courage", the official motto of the Toronto Maple Leafs ice hockey team.
- "Woman, Life, Freedom"
- ”Yesterday, Today, and Tomorrow”
- "Gaslight, gatekeep, girlboss", a parody of "Live, Laugh, Love"

== See also ==
- Rule of three (writing)
- Chengyu

=== Related terms ===
- Hendiadys, one through two has one of the parts subordinate to the other
- Tricolon, isocolon of three parts, with the parts equivalent in structure, length and rhythm
- Merism, denoting a whole by an enumeration of its parts
- Triad (disambiguation)
