= Sex and drugs and rock and roll =

"Sex & Drugs & Rock & Roll" is a 1977 single by Ian Dury, who popularised the phrase.

Sex and drugs and rock and roll may refer to:

== Music ==
- Sex, Drugs & Rock 'n' Roll, 1989 live album by American heavy metal band Mentors
- "Sex Drugs & Rock-n-Roll", song by American glam metal Faster Pussycat on their 2006 The Power and the Glory Hole
- "Sex & Drugs & Rock and Roll", song by American heavy metal band Texas Hippie Coalition on their 2012 album Peacemaker
- "Sex, Drugs, Rock 'n' Roll", 2021 single by American avant-pop musician Will Wood.

== Other ==
- "Sex, drugs, and rock 'n' roll", a phrase describing a hedonistic lifestyle, similar to "wine, women and song"
- Sex & Drugs & Rock & Roll (film), a 2010 biographical film about Ian Dury by Mat Whitecross
- Sex and Drugs and Rock and Roll: The Life of Ian Dury, a biography of Ian Dury
- Sex, Drugs, Rock & Roll (stage show), a one-man stage show by Eric Bogosian
- Sex, Drugs, Rock & Roll (film), a 1991 film of the Eric Bogosian stage show
- Sex, Drugs, Rock 'N' Roll & the End of the World, a 1982 American comedy album
- Sex & Drugs & Rock & Roll (TV series), a 2015 American comedy television series created by and starring Denis Leary

== See also ==
- A Tale of Sex, Designer Drugs, and the Death of Rock N Roll, a 1998 EP by American rock band Pretty Boy Floyd
- Sex and drugs
