= Melayu Islam Beraja =

State ideology of Brunei

Melayu Islam Beraja (abbrev: MIB; Jawi: ملايو اسلام براج; English: Malay Islamic Monarchy) was officially proclaimed as the national philosophy of Brunei on the day of its independence on 1 January 1984 by Sultan Hassanal Bolkiah.

MIB is described as "a blend of Malay language, culture, and Malay customs, the teaching of Islamic laws and values and the monarchy system which must be esteemed and practiced by all." Islam is the official and state religion of Brunei.

== History ==
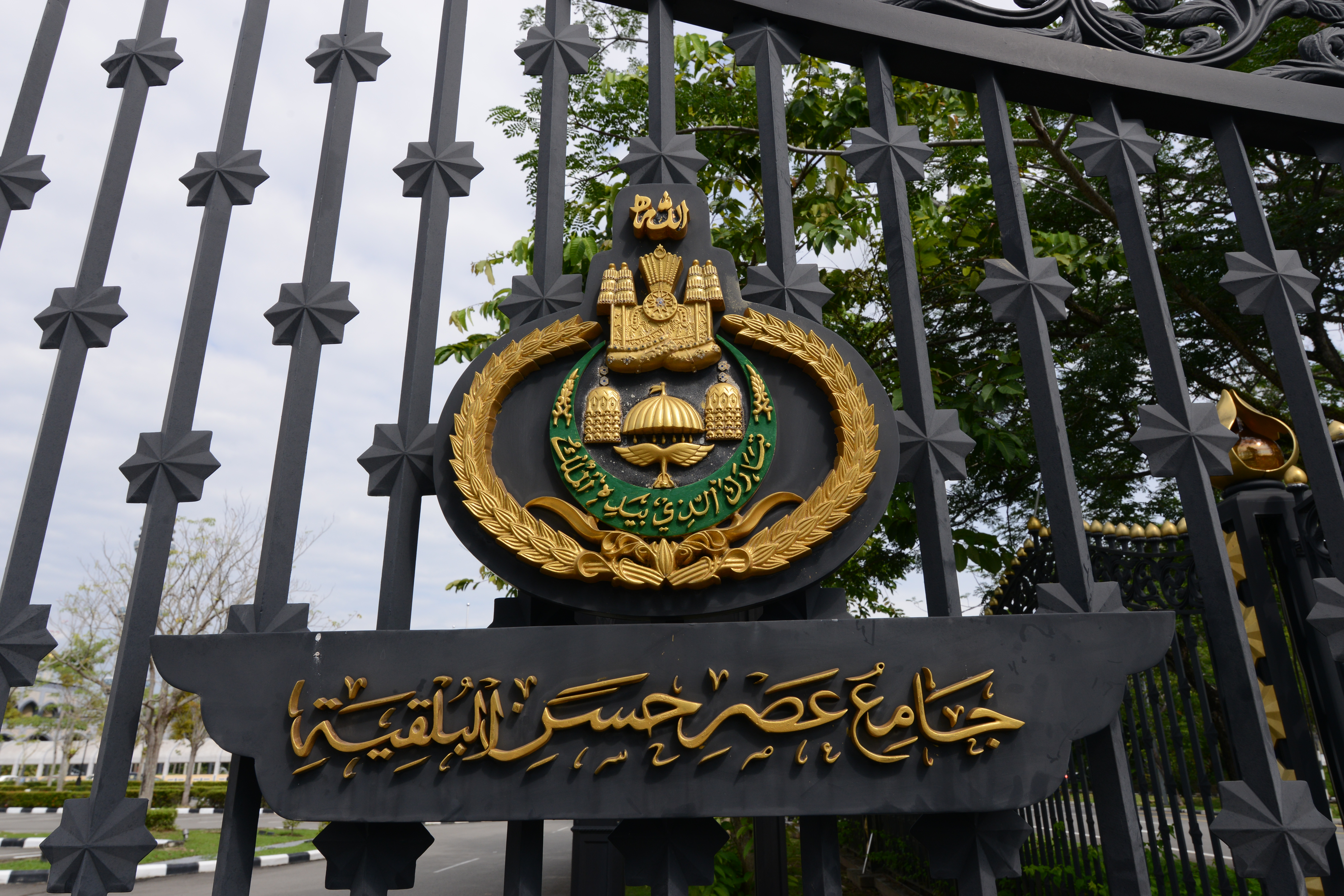
Plaque outside the Jame' Asr Hassanal Bolkiah Mosque bearing the national arms.

The concept of MIB is one that Brunei citizens adhere to in both daily life and the management of the nation's affairs. On 1 January 1984, the country's independence day, Brunei was formally recognized as a Malay Islamic Monarchy. In all matters, especially those involving the government, the MIB as a national concept and holding serves as the foundation. Radio Television Brunei (RTB), the state broadcaster and primary media outlet of the country, plans to put the MIB idea into practice.

The idea of the Kesultanan Melayu Islam (Islamic Malay Sultanate) was first used in 1957 and was supported by Sultan Omar Ali Saifuddien III based on the initial recommendations of the 'Jawatankuasa Tujuh Serangkai' A series. It was finally referred to as the MIB in the 1984 Declaration of Independence. Following the signing of the Agreement between Brunei and the United Kingdom in 1979 for the five-year preparation of Brunei towards independence, the Information Department of Brunei spread this concept. In other words, Sultan Hassanal Bolkiah's declaration of the Islamic Malay Sultanate in 1984 was based on discussions that took place in London on 30 September 1957.

As part of the MIB philosophy, which is based on the Quran and Hadith, the Sultan reminded the citizens of this nation to practice and implement the teachings of Islam.

== Description ==
Melayu in the MIB concept refers to Brunei as a Malay nation that upholds traditional values and culture. The culture and traditions of the Malay people, which have been passed down from generation to generation, are practiced by the people and society in the nation. The dialect used in all official proceedings and official communication, the language is also a common language and a symbol of interethnic cooperation in this nation. The seven indigenous people included in the 1959 Brunei Constitution—Brunei Malay, Kedayan, Belait Malay, Tutong Malay, Bisaya, Dusun, and Murut—are referred to as Brunei Malay.

Islam was established as the nation's official religion in the 1959 Brunei Constitution. Islam has long been the dominant religion in Brunei and the guiding principle of the administration of the Brunei Sultanate. In the royal institution, the Sultan is in charge and serves as the head of state. The 1959 Brunei Constitution outlined the sultan's authority as the country's head of state.

== See also ==
- Malay Islamic identity
- Ketuanan Melayu
- Nation, Religion, King
- Orthodoxy, Autocracy and Nationality
- Sumpah Pemuda of 1928
