= Wine, women and song =

Figure of speech

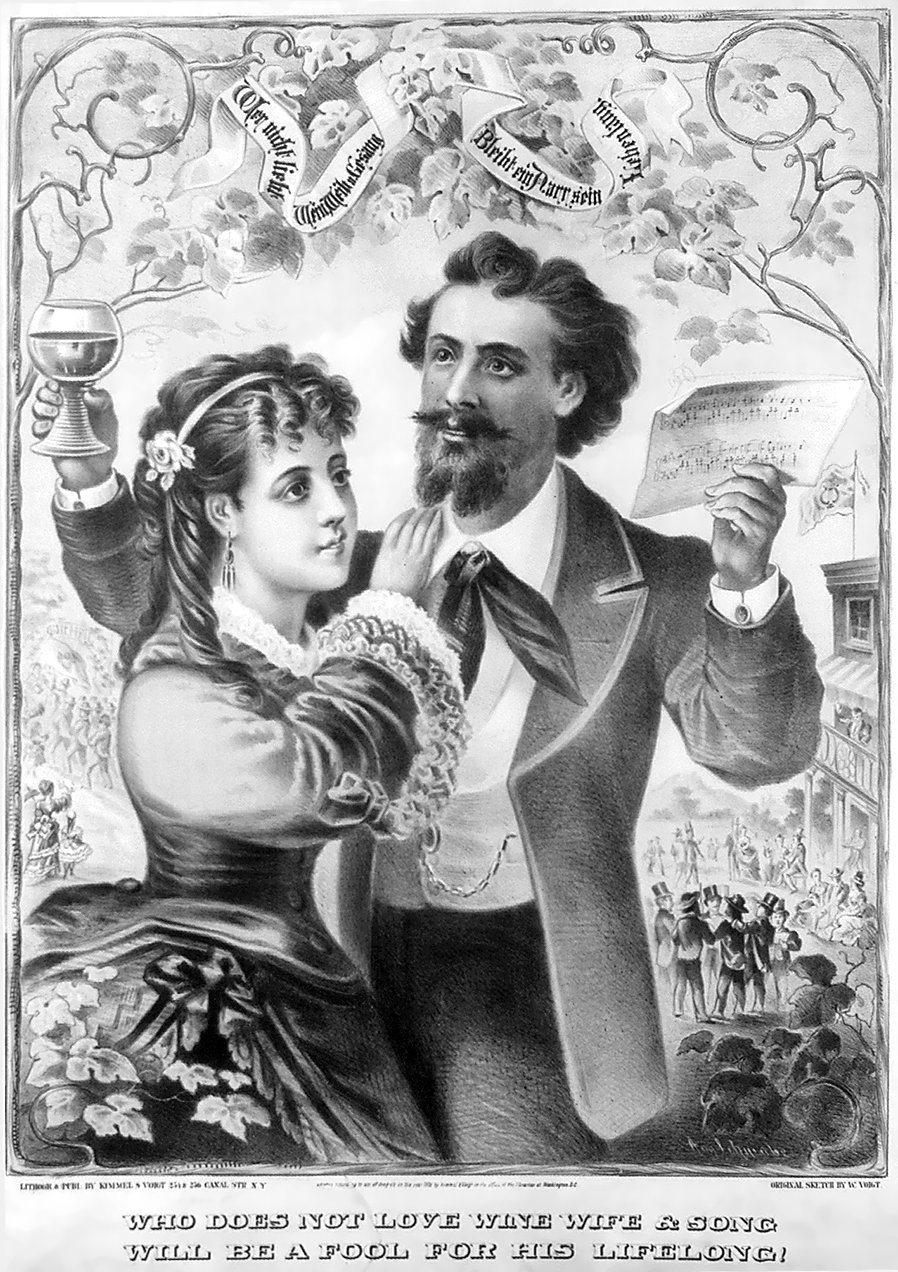
Inscription: "Who does not love wine wife & song will be a fool for his lifelong!" German banner reads, „Wer nicht liebt Wein, Weib u Gesang/Bleibt ein Narr sein Lieben lang.“

"Wine, women, and song" is a hendiatris that endorses hedonistic lifestyles or behaviors. A more modern form of the idea is often expressed as "sex and drugs and rock 'n' roll", a phrase popularized by British singer Ian Dury in his song of the same title.

== Linguistic variations ==
Similar tripartite mottoes have existed for a long time in many languages, for example:

- Bengali: Sur, Sura, Sundari, lit. 'music, wine and woman'
- Bulgarian: Пиене, ядене и някоя сгодна женица, lit. 'drink, food and a good woman'
- Czech: Víno, ženy a zpěv, lit. 'wine, women and singing'
- Danish: Vin, kvinder og sang, lit. 'wine, women and song' also more modern as Danish: Øl, fisse og hornmusik, lit. 'beer, pussy and horn music'
- Estonian: Sigarettid ja viinad ja kirglised naised, lit. 'Cigarettes, vodka and hot women'
- Finnish: Viini, laulu ja naiset, lit. 'wine, song, and women' also more modern as Finnish: Rock, ruoho ja rakkaus, lit. 'rock, weed and love'
- Georgian: ღვინო, დუდუკი, ქალები, romanized: ghvino, duduk'i, kalebi (wine, duduk, women)
- German: Wein, Weib und Gesang, lit. 'wine, woman and singing'
- Italian: Bacco, tabacco e Venere, lit. 'Bacchus, tobacco and Venus'
- Norwegian: Piker, vin og sang, lit. 'girls, wine and song'
- Persian: Kabab, Sharab va Shabab, lit. 'meat, wine and youth'
- Polish: Wino, kobiety i śpiew, lit. 'wine, women and singing'
- Portuguese: Putas, música e vinho verde, lit. 'whores, music and green wine'
- Swedish: Vin, kvinnor och sång, lit. 'wine, women and song'
- Spanish: Naipes, mujeres y vino, mal camino, lit. 'cards, women and wine, bad way'
- Colombian Spanish: Mujeres, música y trago (Women, music and drink)

== Origins ==
The origins of the phrase are obscure. The proverb "Who loves not wine, women and song, remains a fool his whole life long" is often erroneously attributed to Martin Luther, and appears in print for the first time in 1775. There do seem to have been several variants of "wine, women and X" around Luther's time, however, in classical and Medieval Latin, and he may have been alluding to these in one of his 1536 table talks when he said "in [a German's] drunkenness [he is] chiefly such a one who does not choose music and women".

The phrase "Wine, women and song" alone was first printed in a German folksong in 1602 ("Wein, Weib und Gesang"). The earlier Latin variants are probably the source of English proverbs such as "Weemen, dise and drinke, lets him nothing" from 1576. The exact phrase in English appears in 1857, in Henry Bohn's translation of Karl Joseph Simrock's proverb collection Die deutschen Sprichwörter, but similar variants had already appeared in English verse, such as the poem "Give me women, wine, and snuff" by John Keats (1817), and the line "Let us have Wine and Women, Mirth and Laughter" in Don Juan by Lord Byron (1819). The Irish poet Edward Lysaght (1763–1810) used the phrase "poetry and pistols, wine and women." The proverb's popularity in English was increased further by the 1899 publication of Wine, Women and Song, Medieval Latin Student Songs by John Addington Symonds.

== In popular culture ==
The English phrase gained popular currency in the 20th century. Parodies or variants of it frequently feature in caricatures, headlines and slogans.

- The waltz "Wine, Women and Song" (Wein, Weib und Gesang) is Op. 333 (1869) of Johann Strauss II.
- The lines Deutsche Frauen, deutsche Treue, / Deutscher Wein, und deutscher Sang (German women, German loyalty, / German wine, and German song) are found in the second verse of Das Lied der Deutschen, the third verse of which is the German national anthem.
- The painting Three Costly Things by the Austro-Hungarian painter Friedrich von Amerling pictures a man holding a glass of wine in his right hand and, with his left, caressing a woman holding a lute.
- The single "Sex & Drugs & Rock & Roll" by Ian Dury, mentioned above, popularized the modern English-language successor of the phrase.
- The British poet Aleister Crowley, in his work Energized Enthusiasm, suggests that "wine, women, and song" may be utilised towards the development of genius in the individual or the attainment of mystical states.
- The musical trio Wine, Women and Song consists of award-winning singer/songwriters Gretchen Peters, Suzy Bogguss, and Matraca Berg.
- AC/DC quotes the motto in the title song of their album High Voltage (1976).
- The Rolling Stones in the song Saint of Me slightly adjust the motto to "women, wine, and song" in reference to Augustine of Hippo's life before his conversion
- In the Beatles' 1964 film A Hard Day's Night, the phrase is uttered by road manager Norm in reference to Ringo, who has escaped from the studio to go gallivanting after tiring of being teased by his bandmates: "God knows what you've unleashed on the unsuspecting South. It'll be wine, women, and song all the way with Ringo when he gets the taste for it."
- In a wagon scene in the comic strip Calvin and Hobbes, Calvin asks Hobbes if he thinks the secret to happiness is "money, cars and women" or "just money and cars".
- "Wine, Women an' Song" is the name of the fifth song on Come an' Get It by Whitesnake.
- The Bee Gees' song "Wine and Women" starts with the sentence "wine and women and song will only make me sad". It was released as a single in 1965 in Australia and was their first top 20 on the local charts and ever in their career.
- Swedish hard rock band Talisman featuring onetime Journey frontman Jeff Scott Soto had a song called "Women, Whiskey and Songs" on their self titled 1990 debut album.
- The guitarist Adrian Legg's 1993 album Wine, Women & Waltz utilizes a variant of the phrase.
- "Wine Women and Song" is the first song on American rock band Harvey Danger's 2005 album Little by Little....

== See also ==
- Joie de vivre
- Drinking culture
- Playboy lifestyle
- Bacchanalia
- Decadence
