= Liberté, égalité, fraternité =

National motto of France and Haiti

The official logo of the French Republic used on government documents with the slogan "Liberté, Égalité, Fraternité"

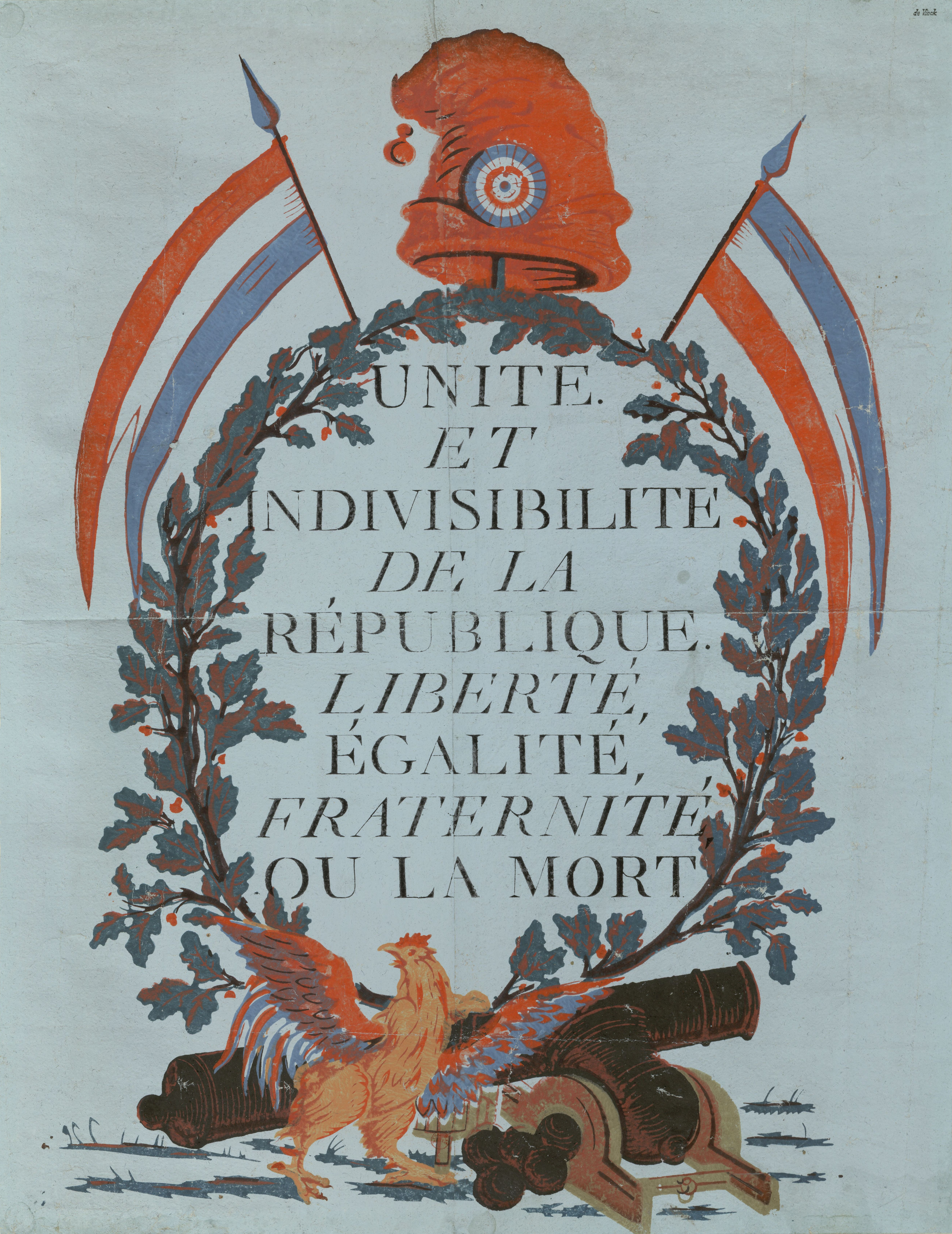
A propaganda poster from 1793 representing the French First Republic with the slogan "Unity and Indivisibility of the Republic. Liberty, Equality, Fraternity or Death", together with symbols such as tricolour flags, phrygian cap and gallic rooster

Liberté, égalité, fraternité (French pronunciation: [libɛʁte eɡalite fʁatɛʁnite]; French for 'liberty, equality, fraternity', Latin: Libertas, aequalitas, fraternitas; Haitian Creole: Libète, egalite, fratènite), is the national motto of France and the Republic of Haiti, and is an example of a tripartite motto. Although its origins can be traced to the French Revolution, it was then only one motto among several popularized by revolutionaries and was not institutionalized until the Third Republic at the end of the 19th century. Debates concerning the compatibility and order of the three terms began at the same time as the Revolution. It is also the motto of the Grand Orient and the Grande Loge de France. During the German occupation of France during World War II, the collaborationist independent French State adopted the variation "travail, famille, patrie" (work, family, country).

== History ==
=== Origins during the French Revolution ===
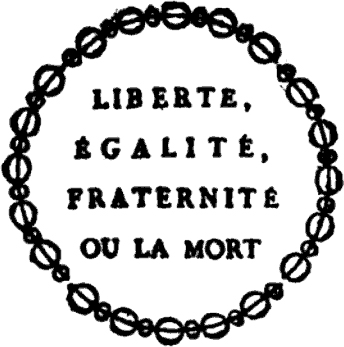
Text displayed on a 1793 placard announcing the sale of expropriated property (biens nationaux). Soon after the Revolution, the motto was often written as "Liberty, Equality, Fraternity, or Death". "Death" was later dropped for being too strongly associated with the Reign of Terror and excesses of the Revolution.

The French Tricolour has been seen as embodying all the principles of the Revolution—Liberté, égalité, fraternité.

Some claim that Camille Desmoulins invented the phrase the 35th issue of Révolutions de France et de Brabant that was published on 26 July 1790; however, it is not confirmed as this is only the first official mention of the phrase. Speaking at the July 1790 Fête de la Fédération festival, he described "the citizen-soldiers rushing into each other's arms, promising each other liberty, equality, fraternity" (French: les soldats-citoyens se précipiter dans les bras l'un de l'autre, en se promettant liberté, égalité, fraternité). Several months later, Maximilien Robespierre popularized the phrase in his speech "On the Organization of the National Guard" (French: Discours sur l'organisation des gardes nationales), held on 5 December 1790, which was disseminated widely throughout France by the popular societies.

Discours sur l'organisation des gardes nationales
Article XVI.
They will wear these words engraved on their uniforms: THE FRENCH PEOPLE, & below: LIBERTY, EQUALITY, FRATERNITY. The same words will be inscribed on flags which bear the three colors of the nation.
(French: XVI. Elles porteront sur leur poitrine ces mots gravés : LE PEUPLE FRANÇAIS, & au-dessous : LIBERTÉ, ÉGALITÉ, FRATERNITÉ. Les mêmes mots seront inscrits sur leurs drapeaux, qui porteront les trois couleurs de la nation.)

— Maximilien Robespierre, 1790

Credit for the motto has been given also to Antoine-François Momoro (1756–1794), a Parisian printer and Hébertist organizer.

During the Federalist revolts in 1793, it was altered to "Unity, Indivisibility of the Republic; Liberty, Equality, Brotherhood or Death" (French: unité, indivisibilité de la République; liberté, égalité, fraternité ou la mort). In 1839, the philosopher Pierre Leroux claimed it had been an anonymous and popular creation.

The historian Mona Ozouf underlines that although liberté and égalité were associated as a motto during the 18th century, fraternité was not always included in it, and other terms, such as amitié ("Friendship"), charité ("Charity"), or union ("Union") were often added in its place.

In 1791, the emphasis upon Fraternité during the French Revolution, led Olympe de Gouges, a female journalist, to write the Declaration of the Rights of Woman and of the Female Citizen as a response. The tripartite motto was neither a creative collection, nor really institutionalized by the Revolution. As soon as 1789, other terms were used, such as la Nation, la Loi, le Roi ("The Nation, The Law, The King"), or Union, Force, Vertu ("Union, Strength, Virtue"), a slogan used beforehand by Masonic lodges masonic lodges, or Force, Égalité, Justice ("Strength, Equality, Justice"), and Liberté, Sûreté, Propriété ("Liberty, Security, Property").

In other words, liberté, égalité, fraternité was one slogan among many others. During the Jacobin revolutionary period, various mottos were used, such as liberté, unité, égalité ("Liberty, Unity, Equality"), liberté, égalité, justice ("Liberty, Equality, Justice"), and liberté, raison, égalité ("Liberty, Reason, Equality"). The only solid association was that of liberté and égalité, with fraternité being ignored by the Cahiers de doléances as well as by the 1789 Declaration of the Rights of Man and of the Citizen.

Fraternité was only alluded to in the French Constitution of 1791, as well as in Robespierre's draft Declaration of 1793, placed under the invocation of (in that order) égalité, liberté, sûreté, and propriété ("Equality, Liberty, Safety, Property")—although it was used not as a motto but as articles of declaration, as the possibility of a universal extension of the Declaration of Rights: "Men of all countries are brothers, he who oppresses one nation declares himself the enemy of all." (Note: French: "Les hommes de tous les pays sont frères, celui qui opprime une seule nation se déclare l'ennemi de toutes.") Fraternité did not figure in the August 1793 Declaration. The Declaration of the Rights of Man and of the Citizen of 1789 defined "liberty" in Article 4 as follows:

Liberty consists of being able to do anything that does not harm others: thus, the exercise of the natural rights of every man or woman has no bounds other than those that guarantee other members of society the enjoyment of these same rights.

"Equality" was defined by the Declaration in terms of judicial equality and merit-based entry to government (art. 6):

[The law] must be the same for all, whether it protects or punishes. All citizens, being equal in its eyes, shall be equally eligible to all high offices, public positions and employments, according to their ability, and without other distinction than that of their virtues and talents.

Liberté, égalité, fraternité finds its origins in a May 1791 proposition by the Club des Cordeliers, following a speech on the Army by the Marquis de Guichardin. A British marine held prisoner on the French ship Le Marat in 1794, wrote home in letters published in 1796:

The republican spirit is inculcated not in songs only, for in every part of the ship I find emblems purposely displayed to awaken it. All the orders relating to the discipline of the crew are hung up, and prefaced by the words Liberté, Égalité, Fraternité, ou la Mort, written in capital letters.

The compatibility of liberté and égalité was not in doubt in the first days of the Revolution, and the problem of the antecedence of one term on the other not lifted. Abbé Sieyès considered that only liberty ensured equality, unless equality was to be the equality of all, dominated by a despot, while liberty followed equality ensured by the rule of law. The abstract generality of law, theorized by Jean-Jacques Rousseau in his 1762 book The Social Contract, thus ensured the identification of liberty to equality, liberty being negatively defined as an independence from arbitrary rule, and equality considered abstractly in its judicial form.

This identification of liberty and equality became problematic during the Jacobin period, when equality was redefined, for instance, by François-Noël Babeuf, as equality of results, and not only a judicial equality of rights. Thus, Marc Antoine Baudot considered that the French temperament was inclined more towards equality than liberty, a theme which was re-used by Pierre Louis Roederer and Alexis de Tocqueville. Jacques Necker considered that an equal society could only be found on coercion.

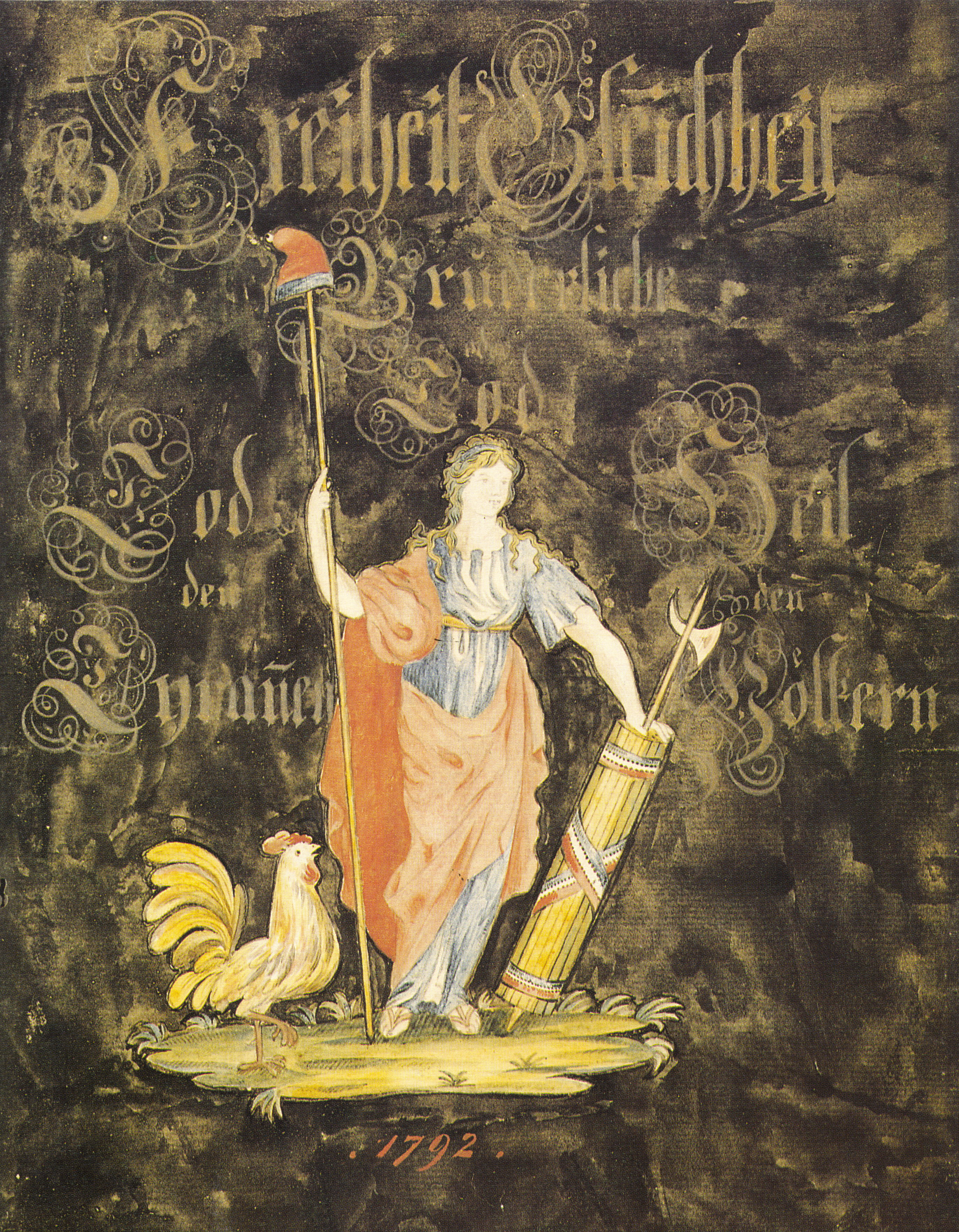
An Alsatian sign, 1792: Freiheit Gleichheit Brüderlichk. od. Tod ("Liberty Equality Fraternity or Death") Tod den Tyranen ("Death to Tyrants") Heil den Völkern ("Long Live the Peoples")

The third term, fraternité, was the most problematic to insert in the triad, as it belonged to another sphere, that of moral obligations rather than rights, links rather than statutes, harmony rather than contract, and community rather than individual liberty. Various interpretations of fraternité existed. The first one, according to Mona Ozouf, was one of fraternité de rébellion ("Fraternity of Rebellion"), that is the union of the deputies in the Jeu de Paume Oath of June 1789, refusing the dissolution ordered by the King Louis XVI ("We swear never to separate ourselves from the National Assembly, and to reassemble wherever circumstances require, until the constitution of the realm is drawn up and fixed upon solid foundations"). "Fraternity" was thus issued from "liberty", and oriented by a common cause.

Another form of fraternité was that of the patriotic Church, which identified social links with religious links and based fraternity on Christian brotherhood. In this second sense, fraternité preceded both liberté and égalité, instead of following them as in the first sense. Thus, two senses of fraternity: "one, that followed liberty and equality, was the object of a free pact; the other preceded liberty and equality as the mark on its work of the divine craftsman."

Another hesitation concerning the compatibility of the three terms arose from the opposition between liberty and equality as individualistic values, and fraternity as the realization of a happy community, devoid of any conflicts and opposed to any form of egotism. This fusional interpretation of Fraternity opposed it to the project of individual autonomy and manifested the precedence of Fraternity on individual will.

In this sense, it was sometimes associated with death, as in Fraternité, ou la Mort! ("Fraternity or Death!"), excluding liberty and even equality, by establishing a strong dichotomy between those who were brothers and those who were not, in the sense of "you are with me or against me", brother or foe. Louis Antoine de Saint-Just thus stigmatized the cosmopolitanism of Anacharsis Cloots, declaring "Cloots liked the universe, except France."

With the Thermidorian Reaction and the fall of Robespierre, fraternité disappeared from the slogan, reduced to the two terms of liberty and equality, re-defined again as simple judicial equality and not as the equality upheld by the sentiment of fraternity. In 1799, Napoleon Bonaparte (the First Consul) established the motto liberté, ordre public ("Liberty, Public Order").

=== 19th century ===
Following Napoleon's rule, the triptych dissolved itself, as none believed it possible to conciliate individual liberty and equality of rights with equality of results and fraternity. The idea of individual sovereignty and of natural rights possessed by man before being united in the collectivity, contradicted the possibility of establishing a transparent and fraternal community. Liberals accepted liberty and equality, defining the latter as equality of rights and ignoring fraternity.

Early socialists rejected an independent conception of liberty, opposed to the social, and also despised equality as they considered, as Charles Fourier, that one had only to orchestrate individual discordances, to harmonize them, or they believed, as Henri de Saint-Simon, that equality contradicted equity by a brutal levelling of individualities. Utopian socialism thus only valued fraternity, which was in the Icarians movement of Étienne Cabet the sole commandment.

This opposition between liberals and socialists was mirrored in rival historical interpretations of the Revolution, with liberals admiring 1789, and socialists admiring 1793. The July Revolution of 1830, establishing a constitutional monarchy headed by Louis-Philippe I, substituted ordre et liberté ("Order and Liberty") to the Napoleonic motto Liberté, Ordre public. Despite this apparent disappearance of the triptych, the latter was still being thought in some underground circles, republican secret societies, masonic lodges such as the "Indivisible Trinity", far-left booklets, or during the Canuts Revolt in Lyon. In 1834, the lawyer of the Society of the Rights of Man (Société des droits de l'homme), Jacques-Charles Dupont de l'Eure, a liberal sitting in the far-left during the July Monarchy, associated the three terms together in the Revue Républicaine, which he edited:

Any man aspires to liberty, to equality, but he can not achieve it without the assistance of other men, without fraternity. (Note: French: "Tout homme aspire à la liberté, à l'égalité, mais on ne peut y atteindre sans le secours des autres hommes, sans la fraternité.")

In 1847, the triptych resurfaced during the Campagne des Banquets, upheld for example in Lille by Alexandre Auguste Ledru-Rollin. Two interpretations had attempted to conciliate the three terms, beyond the antagonism between liberals and socialists. One was upheld by Catholic traditionalists, such as François-René de Chateaubriand or Pierre-Simon Ballanche, the other by socialist and republican such as Pierre Leroux. Chateaubriand gave a Christian interpretation of the revolutionary motto, stating in the 1841 conclusion to his Mémoires d'outre-tombe:

Far from being at its term, the religion of the Liberator is now only just entering its third phase, the political period, liberty, equality, fraternity. (Note: French: "Loin d'être à son terme, la religion du Libérateur entre à peine dans sa troisième période, la période politique, liberté, égalité, fraternité.")

Neither Chateaubriand nor Ballanche considered the three terms to be antagonistic. Rather, they took them for being the achievement of Christianity. On the other hand, Pierre Leroux did not disguise the difficulties of associating the three terms, but superated it by considering liberty as the aim, equality as the principle and fraternity as the means. Leroux ordered the motto as Liberty, Fraternity, Equality, an order supported by Christian socialists, such as Philippe Buchez. Against this new order of the triptych, Jules Michelet supported the traditional order, maintaining the primordial importance of an original individualistic right. Michelet attempted to conciliate a rational communication with a fraternal communication, "right beyond right", and thus the rival traditions of socialism and liberalism. The republican tradition would strongly inspire itself from Michelet's synchretism.

==== 1848 Revolution ====
Liberté, égalité, fraternité on French coins

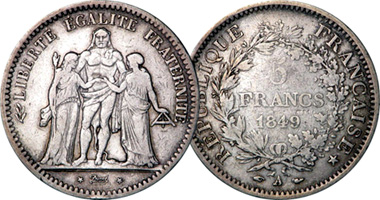
5-franc piece, 1849

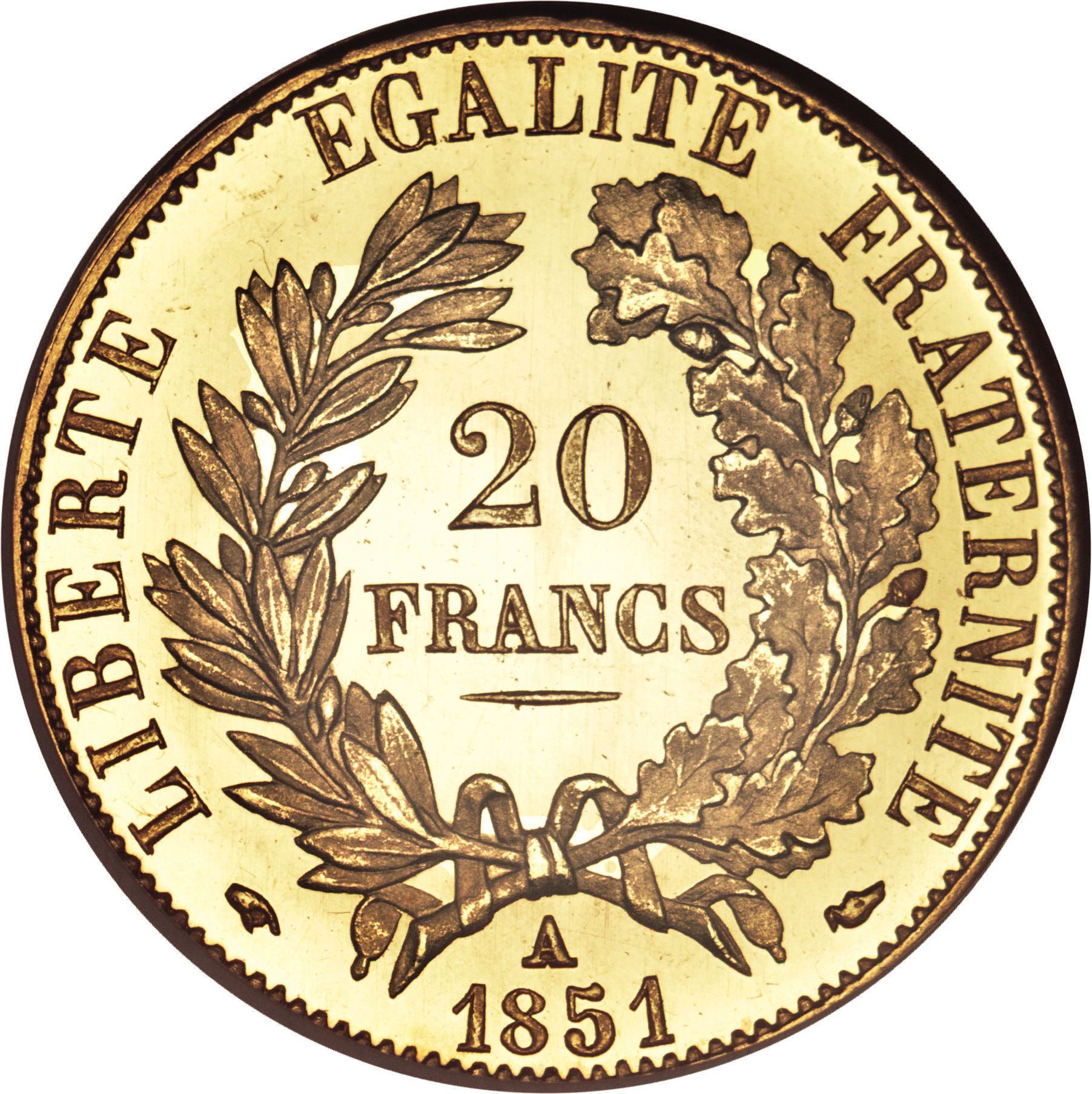
20-franc piece, 1851

With the 1848 February Revolution, the motto was officially adopted, mainly under the pressure of the people who had attempted to impose the red flag over the tricolor flag. The 1791 red flag was the symbol of martial law and of order, not of insurrection. Alphonse de Lamartine opposed popular aspirations, and in exchange of the maintaining of the tricolor flag, conceded the Republican motto of liberté, égalité, fraternité, written on the flag, on which a red rosette was added. It also appeared for the first time on coins. "Fraternity" was then considered to resume, and to contain both "liberty" and "equality", being a form of civil religion that far from opposing itself to Christianity, it was associated with it in 1848, establishing social links, as called for by Rousseau in the conclusion of the Social Contract.

Fraternity was not devoid of its previous sense of opposition between brothers and foes, with images of blood haunting revolutionary Christian publications, taking in Félicité de La Mennais' themes. Thus, the newspaper Le Christ républicain (The Republican Christ) developed the idea of the Christ bringing forth peace to the poor and war to the rich. On 6 January 1852, the future Napoleon III, first President of the Republic, ordered all prefects to erase the triptych from all official documents and buildings, conflating the words with insurrection and disorder. Auguste Comte applauded Napoleon, claiming equality to be the "symbol of metaphysical anarchism", and preferring to it his diptych "ordre et progrès" ("Order and Progress)", which became the motto of Brazil, Ordem e Progresso ("Order and Progress") Pierre-Joseph Proudhon, who preferred only liberty, criticized fraternity as an empty word, which he associated with idealistic dreams of Romanticism.

==== Paris Commune and Third Republic ====
Jean-Nicolas Pache, mayor of the Paris Commune, painted the formula liberté, égalité, fraternité, ou la mort ("Liberty, Equality, Fraternity, or Death") on the walls of the commune. It was under the French Third Republic that the motto was made official. It was then not dissociated with insurrection and revolutionary ardours, Opportunist Republicans such as Jules Ferry or Léon Gambetta adapting it to the new political conditions. Pierre Larousse's Dictionnaire universel deprived fraternity of its "evangelistic halo", conflating it with solidarity and the welfare role of the state.

Some still opposed the Republican motto, such as the nationalist Charles Maurras in his Dictionnaire politique et critique, who claimed liberty to be an empty dream, equality an insanity, and only kept fraternity. Charles Péguy, renewing with Lamennais' thought, kept fraternity and liberty, excluding equality, seen as an abstract repartition between individuals reduced to homogeneity, opposing "fraternity" as a sentiment put in motion by "misery", while equality only interested itself, according to him, to the mathematical solution of the problem of "poverty."

Péguy identified Christian charity and socialist solidarity in this conception of fraternity. On the other hand, Georges Vacher de Lapouge, the most important French author of pseudo-scientific racism and supporter of eugenism, completely rejected the republican triptych, adopting the motto of déterminisme, inégalité, sélection ("Determinism, Inequality, Selection"). According to Ozouf, the sole use of a triptych was the sign of the influence of the republican motto, despite it being corrupted in its opposite.

=== 20th century ===
The coat of arms of France (1905–present) depicts a ribbon with the motto "Liberté, égalité, fraternité".

During the German occupation of France in World War II, this motto was replaced by the reactionary travail, famille, patrie ("Work, Family, Fatherland"), the political slogan adopted by Marshal Pétain, who became the leader of the new Vichy French government in 1940. Pétain had taken this motto from the French Social Party (PSF) of François de La Rocque, although the latter considered it more appropriate for a movement than for a regime.

Following the Liberation, the Provisional Government of the French Republic (GPRF) re-established the Republican motto of liberté, égalité, fraternité, which was incorporated into the 1946 and the 1958 French constitutions. In 1956, the Algerian woman militant Zohra Drif, who during the Algerian War planted a bomb in the Milk Bar Cafe in which three French women were killed, justified this and other violent acts by the National Liberation Front (FLN), asserting that the French authorities did not see their dedication to the principles of equality and liberty as relevant in Algeria.

== Usage by other nations ==
Many other nations have adopted the French slogan of "liberty, equality, and fraternity" as an ideal. Since its founding, "Liberty, Equality and Brotherhood" has been the lemma of the Social Democrats of Denmark. In the United Kingdom, the Liberal Democrats refer to "the fundamental values of liberty, equality and community" in the preamble of the party's Federal Constitution, and this is printed on party membership cards.

The Czech slogan of rovnost, volnost, bratrství ("Equality, Liberty, Fraternity") was a motto of the Sokol movement, a Czech national gymnastics organization, at the end of the 19th century. Liberal values of the fraternal organization manifested themselves in the Czech independence movement during World War I, when many Sokol members joined armies of the Allies and formed the Czechoslovak Legion to form independent Czechoslovakia in 1918.

The Philippine National Flag has a rectangular design that consists of a white equilateral triangle, symbolizing liberty, equality, and fraternity; a horizontal blue stripe for peace, truth, and justice; and a horizontal red stripe for patriotism and valor. In the center of the white triangle is an eight-rayed golden sun symbolizing unity, freedom, people's democracy, and sovereignty. Some former colonies of the French Republic, such as Chad, Niger, and Gabon, adopted similar three-word national mottos. Haiti used it on its coins since 1872, having used Liberte Egalite on earlier coinage since 1828. The idea of the slogan "Liberty, Equality, Fraternity" has influenced as natural law, the First Article of the Universal Declaration of Human Rights:

All human beings are born free and equal in dignity and rights. They are endowed with reason and conscience and should act towards one another in a spirit of brotherhood.

Since 1848, the motto has been present on the throne of the Grand masters of Latin Freemasonry. "Freedom" also alludes to the inner freedom from spiritual chains that are broken with the initiatory work. Lodovico Frapolli_{it}, former Grand Master of the Grand Orient of Italy, suggested to substitute "fraternity" with "solidarity".

== See also ==
- Diversity, equity, and inclusion
- List of political slogans
  - "Give me liberty or give me death!" – 1775 quotation attributed to Patrick Henry
  - "Life, Liberty and the pursuit of Happiness" – 1776 phrase in the United States Declaration of Independence
  - "Brotherhood and unity" – slogan in the Socialist Federal Republic of Yugoslavia
  - "La Nation, la Loi, le Roi" ("The Nation, the Law, the King") – national motto of the Kingdom of France during its brief constitutional period (1791–1792)
  - "Travail, famille, patrie" ("Work, Family, Fatherland") – national motto of Vichy France
  - "Deus, pátria e família" ("God, Fatherland, and Family") – national motto of Portugal under Estado Novo
- "Montjoie Saint Denis!" ("Mountjoy Saint Denis!") – motto of the Kingdom of France
- Three Principles of the People
