= Narodnost =

Narodnost (Russian: народность) is a view or official doctrine of national feeling and nationalism that has influenced social debate and cultural policy in Russia and the Soviet Union. Its meaning has varied at different times.

In general, narodnost means the prevailing feeling of belonging to the nation and national character. It often refers to the basic essence of ordinary people. It can also refer to a group of people who share a common national identity.

The background of the concept of narodnost is at the beginning of the 19th century. In 1833, Emperor Nicholas I's minister of education, Count Sergei Uvarov, declared that the official national policy rested on three principles: the Orthodox faith, autocracy, and nationality. Nationality (narodnost) described the characteristic quality of the Russian people, its steadfast desire to strongly and loyally defend the ruling family and administration. Emperor Alexander III, who ruled at the end of the 19th century, also felt that parliamentarism and Western liberalism would not save Russia from the chaos and popular agitation of anarchists and revolutionaries. Salvation would be brought by three traditional pillars: the Orthodox faith, autocracy and narodnost.

In literary studies, narodnost originally meant loyalty to Russia's distinctive folk cultural heritage, but in the hands of radical critics like Nikolai Dobrolyubov, narodnost became a measure of social responsibility, which was used to measure both the writer's skill in describing the aspirations of ordinary people and the ability to make literature accessible to the masses. These values later became the basic elements of the Soviet Union's officially accepted literary style, i.e. socialist realism.
