= Jean-Baptiste Biaggi =

French lawyer and politician

Jean-Baptiste Albert Antoine Biaggi (French: [ʒɑ̃ batist albɛʁ ɑ̃twan bjadʒi]; 27 August 1918 – 29 July 2009), known to friends as "Bapt", was a French far-right activist, soldier, French Resistance leader, lawyer and politician. He sided with Charles de Gaulle during World War II, welcoming his return from retirement but rejected Gaullism when Algerian self-determination was granted. He retired from mainstream politics but supported the Front National thereafter.

== Biography ==
=== Early years ===
He was born in Ponce, Puerto Rico, the son of Anita Agostini and Pierre-Paul Biaggi, an industrialist. The family moved to the village of Cagnano, Corsica. He studied at the Lycée de Bastia in Corsica, in mainland France at the École Lacordaire in Marseille and then law school, the Faculté de droit de Paris, gaining a Diplômé d’études supérieures de droit. While in Cagnano, he learnt of the extreme-right-wing royalist group Action française. He was influenced by a priest in Corsica, Ange Giudicelli, who was a Maurassien (in spite of the condemnation of Charles Maurras's statements by Pope Pius XI), and by reading articles in L'Action française, the publication of the eponymous extremist royalist group (also condemned by the Pope), provided by a local retired sailor.

=== In metropolitain France ===
He studied law in Paris, gaining first prize in civil law in his second year and the general competition prize at the end of his third. While working for his law degree met Jacques Maurras, nephew of Charles Maurras. He became a student delegate for Action Française and, at the Faculté de droit, gave a welcome speech for Maurras senior, who attended the group's student banquet each year.

=== Military service and the Résistance intérieure ===
He enlisted in 1938, then became a cadet in the 1er régiment de dragons in March 1939. During World War II, as a second lieutenant, he was seriously wounded on 10 May 1940 at La Bassée. He was thought to be dead and had already been listed for a posthumous award of officer of the Ordre national de la Légion d'honneur by his command. After a nurse saw him moving, he was operated on in the field, with further operations in Lille and Paris. Declared unfit for service, and with further medical intervention in Marseille, he convalesced between that city and Corsica. In 1941 in Marseille, shortly after an operation, he met Alain Griotteray, a resister and future leader of the Orion network who had been asked by its then leader, Henri d'Astier de la Vigerie, to establish a network base in Marseille for connexions with Algiers. Griotteray asked Biaggi to help organise the passage of intelligence couriers to French north Africa. Biaggi organized the passage of volunteers and Allied personnel through Spain and continued to provide intelligence. D'Astier's network was integrated with the Saint-Jacques network in May 1941 at a time when both networks had been compromised by informants in Paris and northern départements.

In 1943, Griotteray named the network after the village of Orion in Béarn where the network often operated. He went to Algiers when communication with d'Astier became poor; Biaggi became the leader of Orion in his absence along with fellow lawyers, Robert Le Balle, Xavier Escartin and Michel Alliot as co-leaders. The Vaudevir line that they had established for escapes, with the support of local people in France and Spain, continued. The network suffered its second major blow when the Gestapo was provided with intelligence, including from its double-agent, Guy Glebe d’Eu [known as la Capitaine, Jacques, Marcheret and other names). On 13 December 1943, Biaggi and all other leading members were arrested, except Robert La Balle. Biaggi was arrested with naval officer cadet Henry-Jean Roulleaux Dugage and Charles-Louis de Frotté. They were interrogated by collaborator Pierre Bonny's department, passed through the Gestapo offices at 11 Rue des Saussaies - during which time Biaggi was tortured - transferred to Fresnes Prison, then to the camp at Compiègne before transportation by train towards Mauthausen on 4 June 1944.

Biaggi organised a largely successful escape with about 45 others, including Alliot, all jumping from the train. With the help of a disaffected camp guard from Compiègne and a camp priest, Father le Meur, he had secreted a screwdriver and hacksaws in the medical corset he was wearing for the wounds in his belly and back. He threatened to kill those prisoners who said they'd inform the SS guards. One escapee was shot as he fled. Biaggi and others were sheltered in the prefecture of Haute-Marne by its incumbent, Louis de Peretti della Rocca (a Vichyiste), of Corsican origin, and his militiaman son; with false papers provided by the latter, he returned to Paris to continue serving Orion. For the escape, he received the Médaille des évadés. He took part in the liberation of Paris, became the leader of the 4e Commandos de France with Alliot amongst his comrades [d'Astier became the overall leader of these commando groups] and saw action against the Nazis in Belfort and Alsace, where he was wounded once more.

=== Post-war career ===
From 1947, he was a lawyer at the Paris court of appeal. He joined de Gaulle's Rassemblement du peuple français party, failing to be elected as a député for the Assemblée Nationale in 1951 and 1956. Angry at events in Algeria, he was one of the instigators of "tomato day" on 6 February 1956 - when prime minister Guy Mollet was pelted with tomatoes - and other violent demonstrations against Algerian independence. The same year, he founded the Volontaires pour l'Union française, a patriotic anti-communist group. In 1957, he participated with Alexandre Sanguinetti in the Gaullist Parti patriote révolutionnaire which rallied to Gaullism, but which was dissolved the following year. He welcomed the return of General de Gaulle from retirement in June 1958. On 30 November that year, he was elected as a deputy of Paris, representing the 14e circonscription de la Seine (Petit-Montrouge) in the Union pour la nouvelle République party; then, opposed to de Gaulle's support for Algerian independence, he left for the Unité de la République in 1959 (remaining until 1962). He allied himself with deputies Georges Bidault (who had previously condemned Maurras and Action française), Roger Duchet and fellow Corsican Orion member, commando and lawyer Pascal Arrighi to create the Rally for French Algeria (RAF) 8 on November 20, 1959.

He was present in Algiers during the insurrection of January 1960 known as la semaine des barricades. He was arrested by police on his return to France but was released without charge soon after. The progression towards independence in Algeria made him a fervent opponent of General de Gaulle and he became associated with the Organisation armée secrète without becoming active in it. He supported Jean-Louis Tixier-Vignancour in the 1965 presidential elections, alongside Jean-Marie Le Pen who was Tixier-Vignacourt's campaign director (Tixier-Vignancourt and Le Pen were also deputies with Biaggi). Although he retired from mainstream French politics, he was mayor of his former home village, Cagnano, from 1965 to 1983 and a Conseiller régional à l’Assemblée de Corse from 1987. He stayed closely connected to Bernard Antony and his right-wing Catholic organisation, AGRIF, of which he was a member of the board of directors.

In 2003, he was made a Commandeur of the Ordre national de la Légion d'honneur by minister of defence Michèle Alliot-Marie. He died aged 90 at his family home of Terre Rosse, Cagnano, on 29 July 2009. He died aged 90 at his family home of Terre Rosse, Cagnano, on 29 July 2009.

== Awards ==
- Croix de guerre (1939-1945)
- Médaille de la Résistance française
- Ordre national de la Légion d'honneur, commandeur (Journal officiel, 4 May 2003); officier (14 January 1948)
- Médaille des evades
