= Orion network =

French resistance network

The Orion Network was a French Resistance network during World War II that originated from the la chaine Franco-Belge that was created by Henri d'Astier de La Vigerie and Georges Piron de la Varenne in the autumn of 1940. After being compromised in northern France, it was integrated with the Saint-Jacques network and most operations were moved to the south. Its leaders were at the vanguard of the Allied invasion of Provence.

== History ==
=== Inception ===
D'Astier and Piron were respectively French and Belgian veterans of World War I (WWI). D'Astier was a journalist and monarchist who had been involved with the extreme-right-wing Action française in the inter-war period. On the outbreak of World War II, he was called up as a reserve lieutenant, commanding a horse-drawn section in the army (one of his brothers, Francois, was an air force general and another, Emmanuel, founded the Libération-sud network). Piron was the president of the Belgian volunteers who fought with the French army in WWI. After the Armistice of 22 June 1940, D'Astier and Piron joined forces from July 1940 to start a military intelligence network which was initially la chaine Franco-Belge, covering Paris and northern départements. He formed a group of about 150 men in the Fleurines commune with the help of a local abbot, Father Dardenne. Piron was recruited by the Boulard sub-network led by Lucien Feltesse (codename "Jean Boulard"), who for five years had been vice-president of the Belgian veterans and through the Saint-Jacques network had controlled connexions across Belgium and the departments of Somme, Pas-de-Calais and Nord. Piron commanded a protection group within this organization. He provided information on Nazi troop movements and settlements in the Oise as well as military plans for Saint-Nazaire and Brest in the west. .

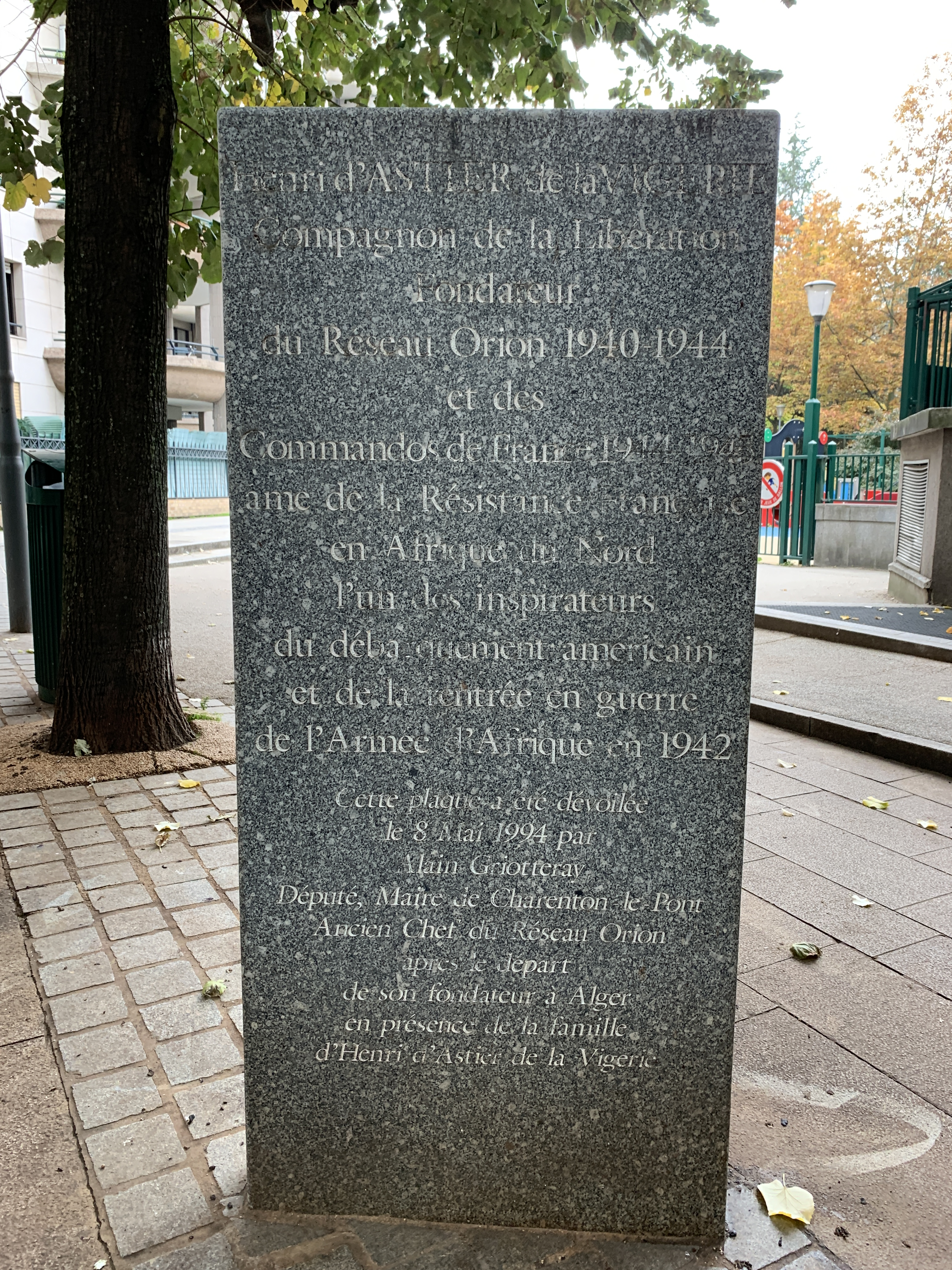
Stone commemorating Henri d'Astier's role in Orion and the Commandos de France in Charenton-le-Pont

=== Development and disruption ===
On 1 January 1941 Léon Tardy, a farmer, mechanic and reserve police sergeant joined the network, having already helped Allied soldiers and aircrew to England and Spain. From January, the network - as it was - suffered major blows as the Gestapo had its first successes in dismantling it due to the collaboration of John Gérard Mulleman and André Folmer. Mulleman was the radio operator for the Saint-Jacques network, with which d'Astier and Piron's network was integrated in May; Saint-Jacques controlled through the BCRA of Free France in London. On 9 October, Piron was arrested. D'Astier worked for two years, between 1941 and 1942, laying the groundwork for the organisation to the south and travelling between France and north Africa, providing clear objectives and instilling a sense of certain victory amongst formerly desperate and overwhelmed resisters. Amongst others in France, he recruited Maxence Faivre d'Arcier, chief of staff to Anatole de Monzie in the ministry of public works and future inspecteur générale des finances. A base for the network was established in Marseille by journalist Alain Griotteray, according to the wishes of d'Astier; this was to facilitate connexions with Algiers to bring French Africa into the fight and to organise the easiest possible escape routes into Spain (notably la Ligne Vaudevir) for Gestapo targets, which was the main function of the network after the occupation of the Zone libre by the Germans.

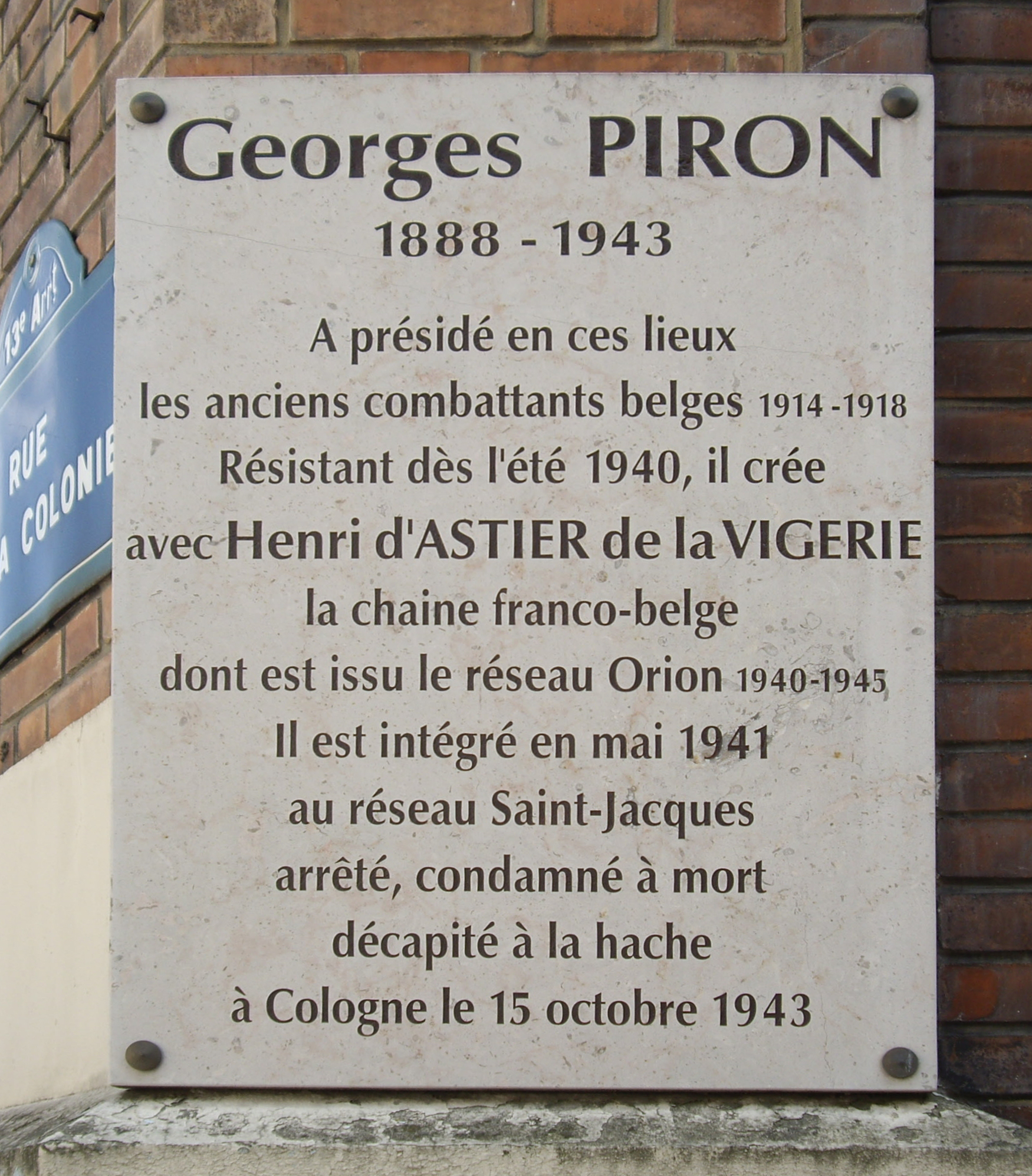
A plaque commemorating Georges Piron's role in Orion and la chaine franco-belge on the Fondation de la France libre, in the 13e arrondissement, Paris

The Orion title was not used until 1943, when Griotteray became its leader (after d'Astier went to Algiers to develop resistance in north Africa) - Paul Labbé - whom Griotteray called the network's "godfather" - suggested he use the name of the hamlet Orion in Béarn province (now part of the Pyrénées-Atlantiques département), as outsiders would think of the constellation and not the rural location with its rustic chateau which was home to Labbé. The hamlet Orion became the "rear" base of the Orion network's operations, two kilometres from the demarcation line, close to Spain for safe passage of personnel, with the help of the UK and US consulates and with the complicity of the people of Bearn and their Basque neighbours.

Connexions had become difficult. Resister Pascal Arrighi had been interned at the Nationalist concentration camp at Miranda de Ebro in Spain. Fellow resister François Clerc had made contact with Claude Arnould of the Jade-Amicol network because d'Astier was under arrest in Algiers. In the absence of instructions from d'Astier, Griotteray went to Algiers, leaving Orion under the interim leadership of lawyer Jean-Baptiste Biaggi, professor of law Robert Le Balle, Michel Alliot and Xavier Escartin. The Gestapo received information from an undercover agent leading to the arrests of its leaders and other members - with the exception of Le Balle - on 13 December 1943. Biaggi was arrested with Henry-Jean Roulleaux-Dugage and Charles-Louis de Frotté in Paris while working with his transit network. They were interrogated by French Gestapo officer Pierre Bonny. Roulleaux Dugage was released without charge after the intervention of his father, deputy of Orne (département), Georges Roulleaux-Dugage. The others were moved to Fresnes Prison then to the Royallieu-Compiègne internment camp from where they were put on a train to Mauthausen concentration camp on 4 June 1944. During his travels, Griotteray spent some time in prisons in Morocco and Spain.

=== Further progression ===
Admiral François Darlan was assassinated by Fernand Bonnier de La Chapelle in Algiers on 24 December 1942; d'Astier and his lieutenant - the abbot, Father Cordier - were arrested under the orders of general Henri Giraud in January 1943 after being implicated in planning Darlan's death [d'Astier also loathed Darlan; in addition, earlier in the war, d'Astier's brother Francois was relieved of his command by Darlan for refusing to bomb Gibraltar in reprisal for the Royal Navy's Attack on Mers-el-Kébir or to provide evidence against his lieutenant, future prime minister Pierre Mendès France]. D'Astier was not released until after the Comité français de libération nationale was formed in June (the combined government of resistance of Free France in London and civil and military authorities in Algeria) and de Gaulle took full control in September forming a provisional government, the Assemblée consultative provisoire. D'Astier was appointed a member of this assembly, now representing the resistance in Algeria. He made a working group with Yves de Kermoal, Pascal Arrighi, Cordier and d'Astier to prepare plans for paratroopers to join with and train the Maquis in France [de Kermoal and Georges Franck wrote the song Marche des commandos]. Griotteray was parachuted in by the US Office of Strategic Services to Orion on 4 April 1944 to pick up the threads of the network. In his role as part of the national defence commission of the Assembly, d'Astier co-founded the Groupe des Commandos de France [which later became the 3e bataillon de choc]. He personally led 45 commandos, including Le Clerc, Arrighi and de Kermoal, firstly to Corsica before landing in Saint-Tropez on 17 August 1944, eventually taking control of all French commando groups pushing back at the Nazis in Germany.

After his arrest, Piron had been transported from Paris to Düsseldorf and finally Köln. He was tried and sentenced to death for spying for the British and decapitated by axe on 15 January 1943 at Klingelpütz prison). Biaggi organised an escape of about 50 prisoners, with Alliot, from the train to Mauthausen and returned to Paris, eventually going on to lead the 4e commandos de France. Tardy, having moved to the Zéro France network in October 1943 was arrested by the Gestapo on his Calvados farm on 23 March 1944 for radio broadcasting, spying, possession of weapons and forging documents. He was interned at Caen, tortured, transported to Neuengamme on 1 June 1944 and then to Stalag X-B near Sandbostel where he died of dysentery on 1 May 1945 (its day of liberation). De Frotté died on 8 July 1944 in Mauthausen when it was bombed in an air-raid. Escartin (who had been allegedly denounced by Mabel de Forest-Bischoffsheim, the estranged British wife of tennis player Jean Borotra) was executed at Mauthausen. Le Balle continued as a leading resister in the Organisation civile et militaire, part of the Conseil National de la Résistance.

== See also ==
- List of networks and movements of the French Resistance
