= Georges Piron de la Varenne =

French resistance leader

Georges Antoine Marie Piron de la Varenne (6 January 1888 – 15 October 1943) was a Belgian volunteer in the French Army in World War I (WWI), a member of the Saint-Jacques network and founder member of la chaine Franco-Belge with Henri d'Astier de la Vigerie which became the Orion network of the French resistance during World War II. He was betrayed, captured by the Gestapo and executed in Köln.

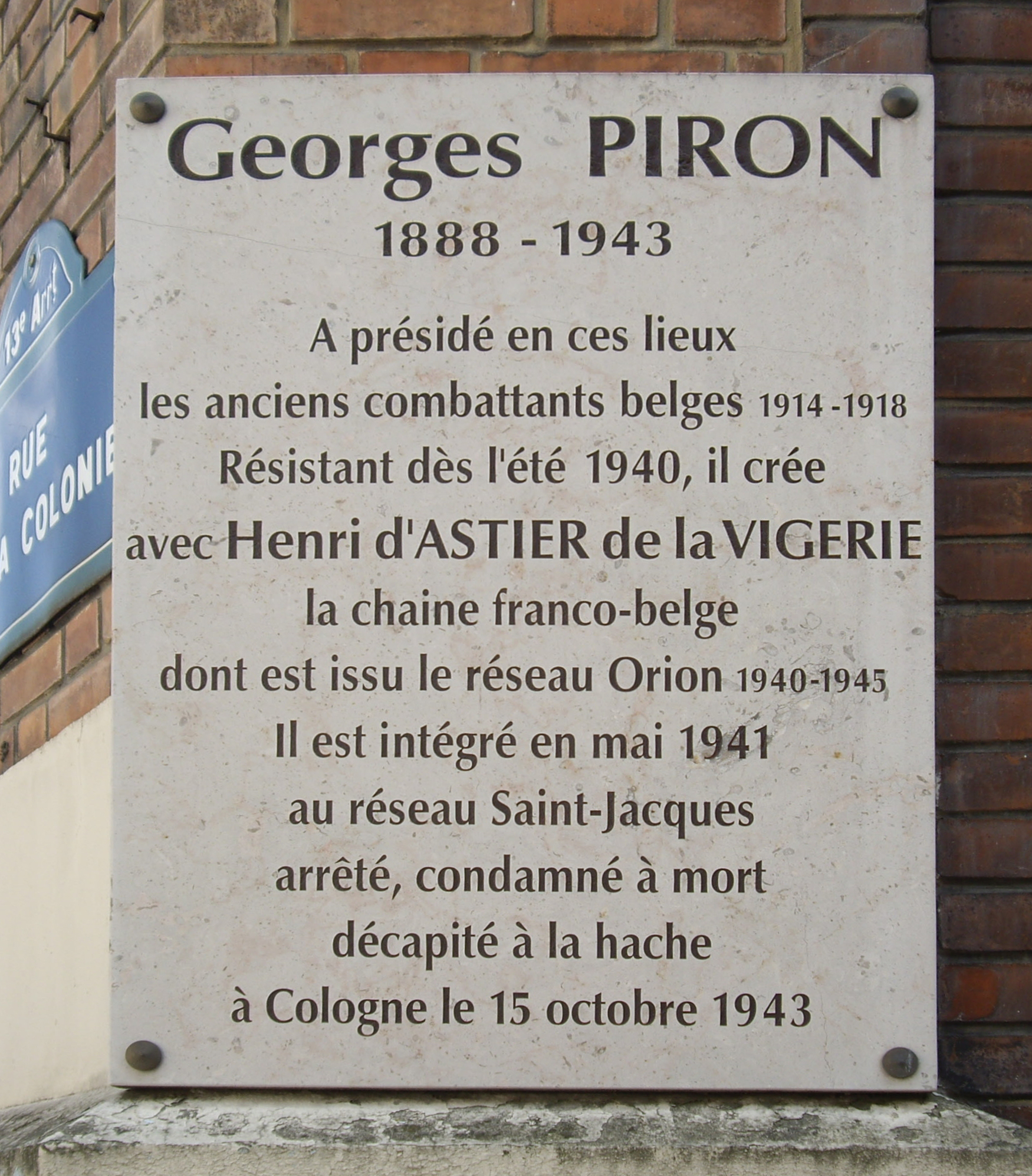
A plaque commemorating Georges Piron's role in Orion and la chaine franco-belge on the Maison de la France libre, in the 13e arrondissement, Paris

== History ==
Piron was born in Laeken, then a separate municipality close to Brussels, Belgium. He was the son of Marie Virginie Van Halle and Henri Joseph Piron de la Varenne. He married and divorced Suzanne Henriette Herzberg and remarried to Servione Marie Laurence Mathilde Stalins. He worked as an engineer and lived at Villa Chatoiseau, in Fleurines. He volunteered for the French Army during WWI. After WWI, he became the president of the Belgian veterans, giving the inaugural speech at the blessing of the memorial to their sacrifice at Père Lachaise cemetery in Paris on 8 October 1922.

=== World War II resistance leader ===
After the French capitulation to Nazi forces, Piron joined with Henri d'Astier - a French veteran of WWI and right-wing monarchist - in the autumn of 1940 to start a military intelligence network which was initially called la chaine Franco-Belge, operating in Paris and northern départements. With the help of Father Dardenne, a local abbot, he organised a group of about 150 men across the region. This was at his own expense. Piron also operated within the Boulard sub-network of Lucien Feltesse (codename Jean Boulard) who had been vice-president of the Belgian veterans for five years. Boulard operated through the Saint-Jacques network across Belgium and the departments of Somme, Pas-de-Calais and Nord. Piron commanded a protection group within Boulard. He provided information for transmission to England on Nazi movements and settlements in the Oise as well as their operations regarding the ports of Saint-Nazaire and Brest.

=== Collapse of the network ===
From January 1941, the Gestapo began to have successes in dismantling Piron and d'Astier's network in its existing form. Piron might have been affected by a lack of compartmentalisation as he regularly attended network cross-referencing meetings at Charles Deguy's office on the Rue Washington. In any case, Maurice Duclos (codename Saint-Jacques and creator of the eponymous network), who had recruited Deguy as his assistant, began to suspect his own radio operator - John Gérard Mulleman from Alsace, of Belgian origins - was a Nazi collaborator after he claimed that (following a parachute drop into the Dordogne) he was captured with a radio set by the Nazis, imprisoned for only three weeks and then released. Duclos' suspicions were correct: over the next few months the network was almost completely destroyed; dozens of arrests of affiliated resisters across northern départements and in Paris were the result of information passed by Mullemann and another collaborator, André Folmer. Many people were imprisoned, deported and executed.

=== Arrest and death ===
Piron's arrest, on 9 October 1941, was directly as a result of Mulleman's denunciation. He was transported from Paris to Germany under Hitler's Nacht und Nebel directive, firstly to Düsseldorf, on 29 April 1942. He was tried and sentenced to death for spying for the British and finally transferred to Klingelpütz prison in Köln, his place of execution, where he was decapitated by axe on 15 October 1943.

=== Awards and legacy ===
He was awarded the mention Mort pour la France and approved as a P2 agent (working full-time for the Resistance) of the Forces françaises combattantes. He was given the awards of the Yser Cross, the Order of Leopold, the Crown, Chevalier de l'Ordre national de la Légion d'honneur, the Croix de Guerre with palm and the Médaille de la Résistance, all posthumously. He is commemorated on the war memorial in Fleurines, in Paris on a plaque at the corner of rue de la Colonie and rue Vergniaud in Paris, (13th arr.) and a stone at Père-Lachaise cemetery.
