= List of networks and movements of the French Resistance =

It is customary to distinguish the various organisations of the French Resistance between movements and networks. A resistance group or network was an organization created for a specific military purpose (intelligence, sabotage, helping prisoners of war escape and preventing shot-down pilots from falling into the hands of the Germans). In contrast, the main goal of a resistance movement was to educate and organize the population.

The majority of resistance movements in France were unified after Jean Moulin's formation of the Conseil National de la Résistance (CNR) in May 1943. CNR was coordinated with the French Forces of the Interior under the authority of the Free French Generals Henri Giraud and Charles de Gaulle and their body, the Comité Français de Libération Nationale (CFLN).

== Major movements ==
- Ceux de la Libération (CDLL) (Right-wing)
- Ceux de la Résistance (CDLR) (Apolitical)
- Combat (Christian democratic)
- Franc-Tireur (Left-wing)
- Francs-Tireurs et Partisans (Communist)
- Libération-Nord (Left-wing)
- Libération-Sud (Left-wing)
- Organisation civile et militaire (OCM) (Right-wing at first and left-wing at the end of the war)

=== Unifications ===
- The Armée secrète (AS) was formed in 1942 to combine the military organisations of the major resistance movements of Vichy France. The organisation had a particularly-strong presence in the Vercors, Lyon and Massif central départements of the Rhône-Alpes region.
- The Mouvements Unis de la Résistance (MUR) was formed in January 1943 as the civilian branch of the Armée Secrète.
- The Mouvement de Libération Nationale (MLN) was formed in early 1944 to combine the MUR of the Southern Zone with several movements in the Northern Zone. Many of the volunteers involved in the MLN went on to found the Democratic and Socialist Union of the Resistance.
- The Bataillons de la Jeunesse militant communist youth movement was incorporated into the Francs-Tireurs et Partisans (FTP).

Ultimately, unification took place from late 1943 to early 1944 when the Armée Secrète, the Francs-Tireurs et Partisans, and other organisations gave birth to the French Forces of the Interior (FFI).

== Other movements ==
- The Special Operations Executive (SOE) was a British military organisation that directed from London. It parachuted more than four hundred agents into Occupied France to establish escape routes, co-ordinate acts of sabotage, set up radio communications and supply materials and armaments for French groups.
- The American OSS and the SOE contributed Jedburgh teams in 1944 to aid the resistance and arrange air supply of equipment.
- Défense de la France was a resistance group in the Northern zone that was centred on the distribution of a clandestine newspaper, whose circulation had reached 450,000 by January 1944.
- The Groupe du musée de l'Homme was formed by Parisian academics and intellectuals in 1940 after General Charles de Gaulle's Appeal of 18 June. It distributed clandestine newspapers but with a more patriotic and conservative position than others. It also transmitted political and military information to Britain and helped to hide escaped Allied prisoners-of-war. Vichy agents eventually infiltrated the group, and many members were arrested and later executed.
- The Noyautage des administrations publiques (NAP) was a resistance organisation launched in 1942 with the mission of infiltrating the administration of the Vichy regime. The main intelligence missions that it carried out on behalf of the Free French provided false papers and prepared for the seizure of power after the liberation of France.
- Mouvement National des Prisonniers de Guerre et Déportés (MNPGD)
- Volontaires de la Liberté, a group composed of school boys (from the Lycée Louis-le-Grand and the Lycée Henri-IV) and university students. Formed in Paris in 1941, most of its members joined the Défense de la France after February 1943 to engage in armed combat.

== Networks ==
- Alibi
- Alliance
- The Brutus Network
- The Notre-Dame Brotherhood
- The Carte Organisation
- Comité d'Action Socialiste (CAS) – Founded in January 1941 by Daniel Mayer, member of the French Socialist Party.
- Comet Line – Helped downed Allied pilots avoid capture by Germans and exfiltrated them to Spain.
- Departmental Committee of Liberation
- Comité de libération du cinéma français
- Interallié – An intelligence organization formed by Roman Sziarnowski and Mathilde Carre. It was crushed in 1942.
- Jade-Amicol network
- Jade-Fitzroy network
- Klan Network - based on the prewar right wing Parti Social Francaise
- Pat O'Leary Network
- Maurice Network
- Réseau Morhange
- Résistance-Fer
- Réseau Orion

== See also ==
- Femmes solidaires
- Liberation of France
- Maquis (World War II)
