= French nationalism during World War II =

French nationalism during World War II experienced divided attitudes towards the Nazi occupier, the Vichy government and the resistance.

In a context of both moral, social and political decline in French society that the extreme right flourished during the interwar period . Undermined by political and financial scandals, the Third Republic was at the same time powerless to curb the effects of the crisis which ravaged France in 1931. Nationalist movements multiplied, advocating for some anti-parliamentarism, for others xenophobia, anti-Semitism, Anti-German sentiment, anti-protestantism or even anti-communism. In 1940, the debacle against the German invader was seen by many French nationalists as the sanction of French decadence and proof that the Republic was incapable of defending the country. The same year, the French placed their destiny in the hands of Marshal Pétain. But the powerful pull of French nationalism drove others to engage in resistance against the occupying German forces.

== French nationalism and the resistance ==
From the defeat of the battle of France in 1940 as well as later, many French nationalists joined General De Gaulle against the German occupation. Gaullism in World War II was strongly nationalist, and components of Free France often came from the right-wing and far-right. De Gaulle himself was a Catholic, nationalist and conservative. In addition, nationalists and monarchists were among the first resistance fighters in France.

Admiration for Nazism or/and fascism is not unanimous in the ranks of the French anti-Semitic far-right, germanophobia and nationalism inducing, among some, the rejection of Nazism.

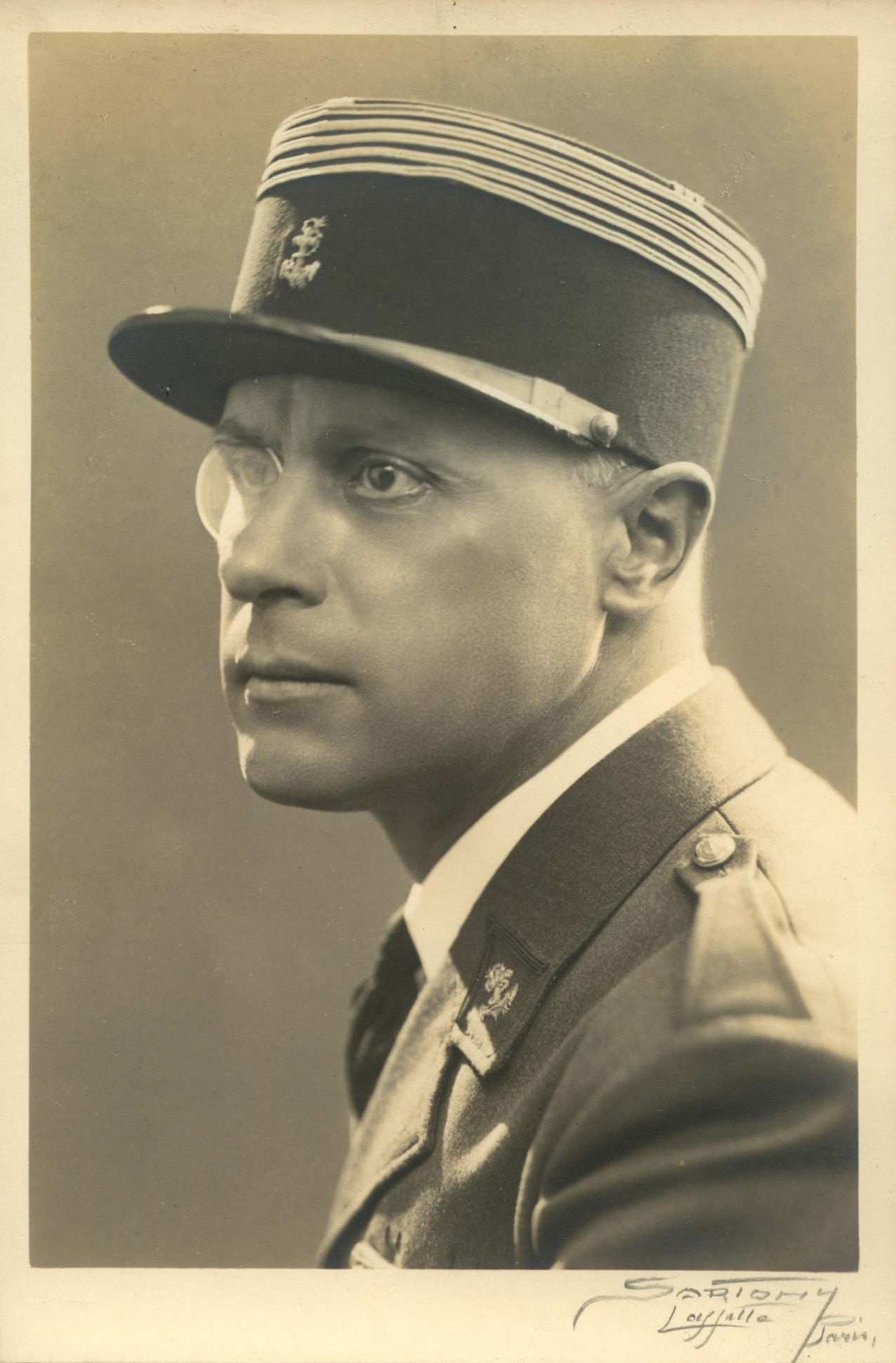
Georges Groussard (officier) towards the end of the 1930s. He was one of the figures of the French nationalist resistance.

Within the French Resistance, many of the early resisters were French nationalists as early as 1940. Many members of the Croix-de-feu, the Action française as well as former Bandera Jeanne d'Arc volunteers (French unit having fought on the side of the Spanish nationalists during the Spanish Civil War) joined the resistance. As soon as Pétain shook Hitler's hand, other nationalists, embittered by the gesture, rallied to the Resistance. August 1940 saw the founding of the resistance network Combat, a non-negligible part of whose members were nationalists. In the Occupied zone, the Resistance Network was born under the impetus of men from various far-right movements, the OCM (Organisation civile et militaire).

Colonel Rémy, who was a nationalist militant before the Second World War, rejected the Armistice of June 22, 1940 from the start and joined the resistance from the appeal of June 18, 1940. He was among the first to join General de Gaulle and would form the resistance movement Confrérie Notre-Dame, a network of right-wing French Catholics.

Georges Loustaunau-Lacau was to be the founder of one of the largest resistance networks, the Alliance Network whose members were mainly from right-wing and far-right circles, Marie-Madeleine Fourcade, herself from the right-wing nationalist and former opponent of the Popular Front will lead the network from 1941 to 1943 then from 1944 until the end of the Second World War. In 1942, Colonel François de la Rocque, a right-wing nationalist of the Croix-de-feu and the French Social Party, founded the Klan Network, linked to the Alibi Network, although this was later stopped. by the Gestapo and deported, his network will operate until the Liberation of France. Noël Ottavi one of the figures of the Croix-de-feu and the French Social Party died during the war because of his resistance activities.

In 1942, Georges Groussard, who had rallied to Vichy, defected and founded the "Gilbert Network", which would work with the British Secret Intelligence Service with the aim of providing information on the German occupiers.

Daniel Cordier, a former member of the Action française and Camelots du Roi, was one of Jean Moulin's relatives and is secretary during the war.

Another phenomenon is that of the "vichysto-resistants", resistance fighters who approve of the policy of the Vichy regime but reject the German occupation, including Pierre de Bénouville or the future president of the French republic François Mitterrand, who will evolve left-wing after the war.

One of the most famous French nationalists who joined the fight against Nazi Germany was Philippe Leclerc de Hauteclocque, a former sympathizer of the Action Française and commander of the 2nd Armored Division which took part in the Liberation of France and in the German Campaign of 1945. Jean de Lattre de Tassigny, also one of the great figures in French military history was also an anti-republican nationalist in the interwar period.

Roger Holeindre, who would become one of the personalities of the post-war French far-right, was a member of the resistance.

== French nationalism in collaboration ==
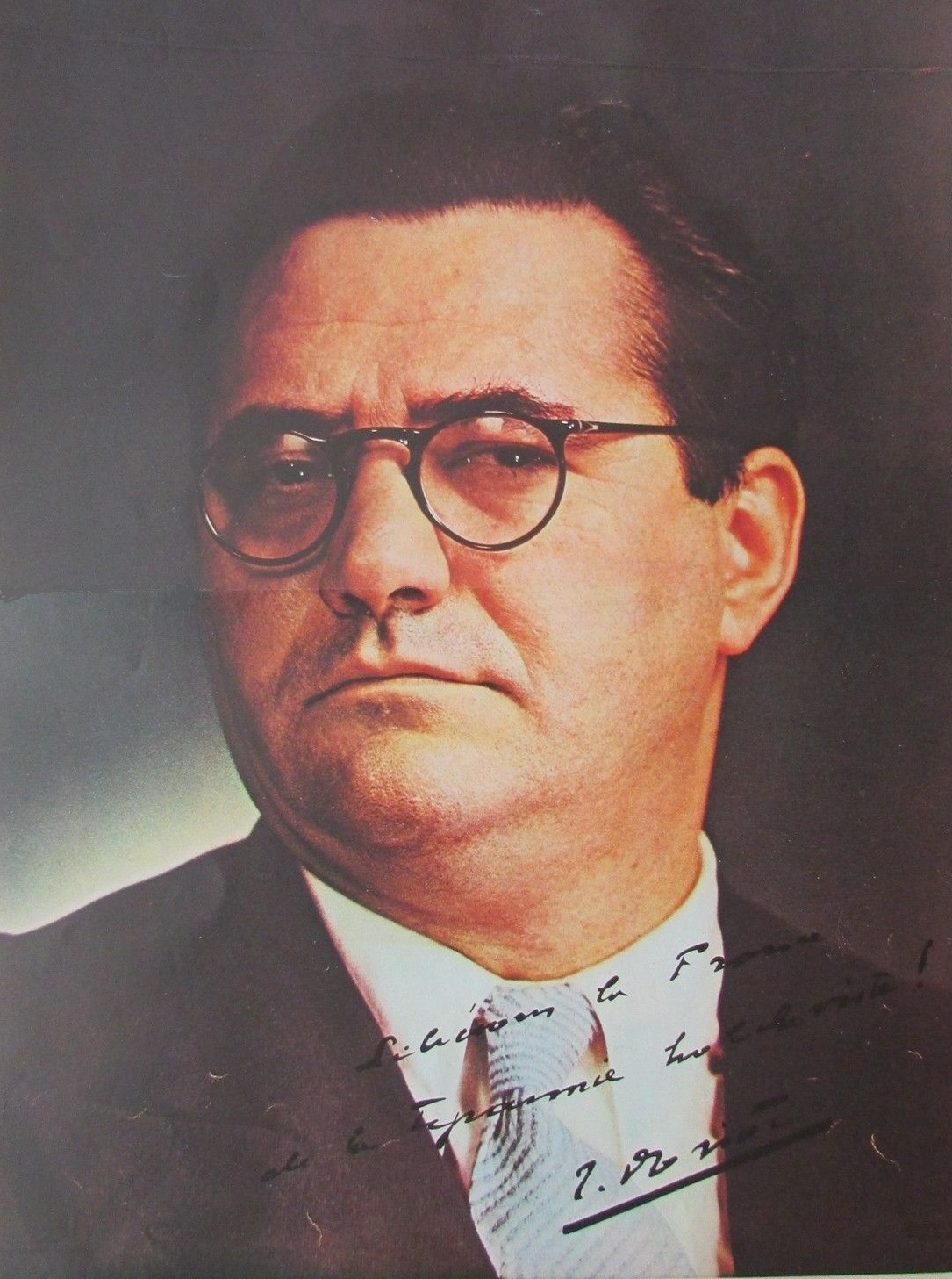
Jacques Doriot in 1941

Another part of the nationalist movement rallied to the collaboration, the French fascists and reactionaries rallied to Marshal Pétain.

The French Popular Party (PPF) of Jacques Doriot was the main political party of the collaboration with Nazi Germany . Marcel Bucard's Parti franciste also participates in the collaboration with the German occupation.

Some members of Action française (AF) did not take the same trajectory as many of their former comrades and decided to collaborate, notably Robert Brasillach and the AF theorician Charles Maurras. Lucien Rebatet who had long been anti-German, decided to collaborate with the German occupation.

Philippe Henriot who was the greatest propagandist of the Vichy regime had campaigned on the extreme right of the interwar period. Some of his former comrades had become resistance fighters while others chose to collaborate. He is finally killed by a commando from the French Forces of the Interior.

The French Milice established by Joseph Darnand was one of the most relentless collaborationist forces during the Vichy regime. This was generally made up of far-right activists and opportunists. Early Milice volunteers included members of France's pre-war far-right parties, such as the Action Française, and working-class men convinced of the benefits of the Vichy government's politics. The Milice persecuted Jews and resistance fighters of all political persuasions (including nationalist resistance fighters) in France.

Fascist-type organization, the Milice wanted to be a revolutionary movement, at the same time anti-republican, anti-Semitic, anti-communist, against international capitalism, for corporatism, nationalist and authoritarian.

== Legacy ==
If in the collective imagination, the collaboration was on the far-right, in reality it was not the only composition and a good number of former leftists also joined the collaboration with Nazi Germany.

Some collaborators were not politicized and were sometimes mafiosos, like Henry Lafont and his Carlingue.

== Documentaries ==
- 1939-1945 – Quand l'extrême droite résistait/When the far-right resisted, 2017.

== Bibliography ==
- Jacques Nobécourt, Le colonel de La Rocque, ou les pièges du nationalisme chrétien, Paris, Fayard, 1996.
- Michel, Albin, ed. (2008). Un paradoxe français, antiracistes dans la Collaboration, antisémites dans la Résistance (in French). ISBN 978-2-226-17915-9..
