= Wallerand de Saint-Just =

French lawyer and politician

Wallerand de Saint-Just d'Autingues
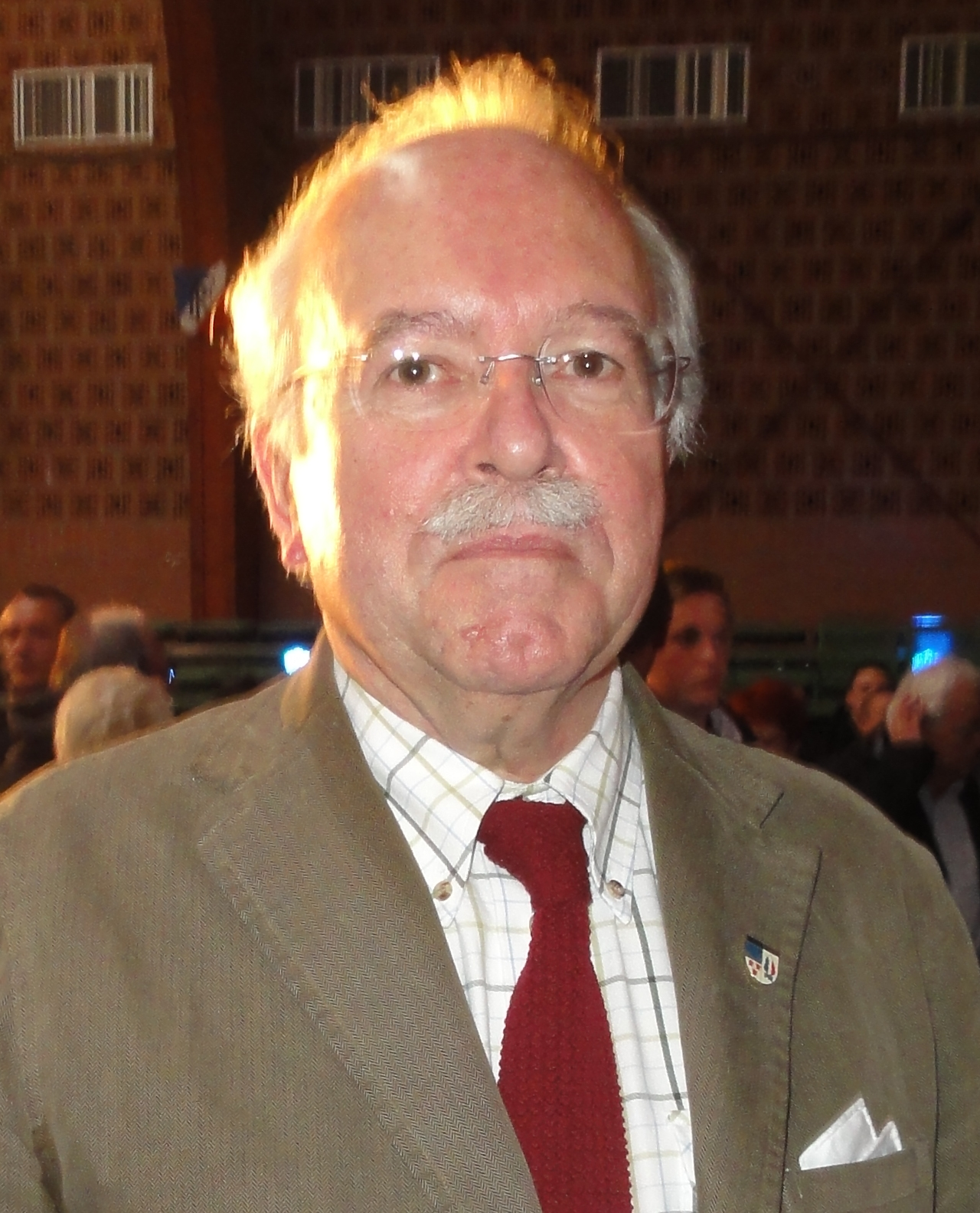
- Wallerand de Saint-Just in 2012
- Born: July 6, 1950 (age 75)
- Occupations: Lawyer, politician
- Political party: National Front
- Spouse: Alix
- Children: 4

Wallerand de Saint-Just (born 6 July 1950) is a French lawyer and politician. He defended traditionalist Catholics and right-wing politicians. He is the vice president of conflicts and treasurer of the National Front.

== Early life ==
Wallerand de Saint-Just was born on 6 July 1950. His family was ennobled in 1742. His father was the mayor of a village in Picardy, where he grew up.

De Saint-Just graduated from the Panthéon-Assas University, where he earned a law degree.

== Career ==
De Saint-Just is a lawyer. One of his first clients was Bernard Antony, a traditionalist Catholic. Another client was Jean-Marie Le Pen, the founder of the National Front. Another client was Bruno Gollnisch. Yet another client was the Lebanese politician Samir Geagea. He also defended the AGRIF and the National Front. In 1993, he defended Serbian leaders at the International Criminal Tribunal for the former Yugoslavia.

An anti-communist, De Saint-Just joined the National Front in 1987. He served on the regional council of Picardy from 1992 to 2004, and he was re-elected in 2010. He also served on the city council of Soissons from 1995 to 2008. He has served as its vice president since 2007. He is also its treasurer. He ran an unsuccessful campaign to become the mayor of Paris in 2013.

== Personal life ==
De Saint-Just has a wife, Alix, and four children. He is a traditionalist Roman Catholic. He took part in the protest at Saint-Nicolas-du-Chardonnet in 1977.
