= Château d'Orion =

Coordinates: 43.4186°N 0.8644°W

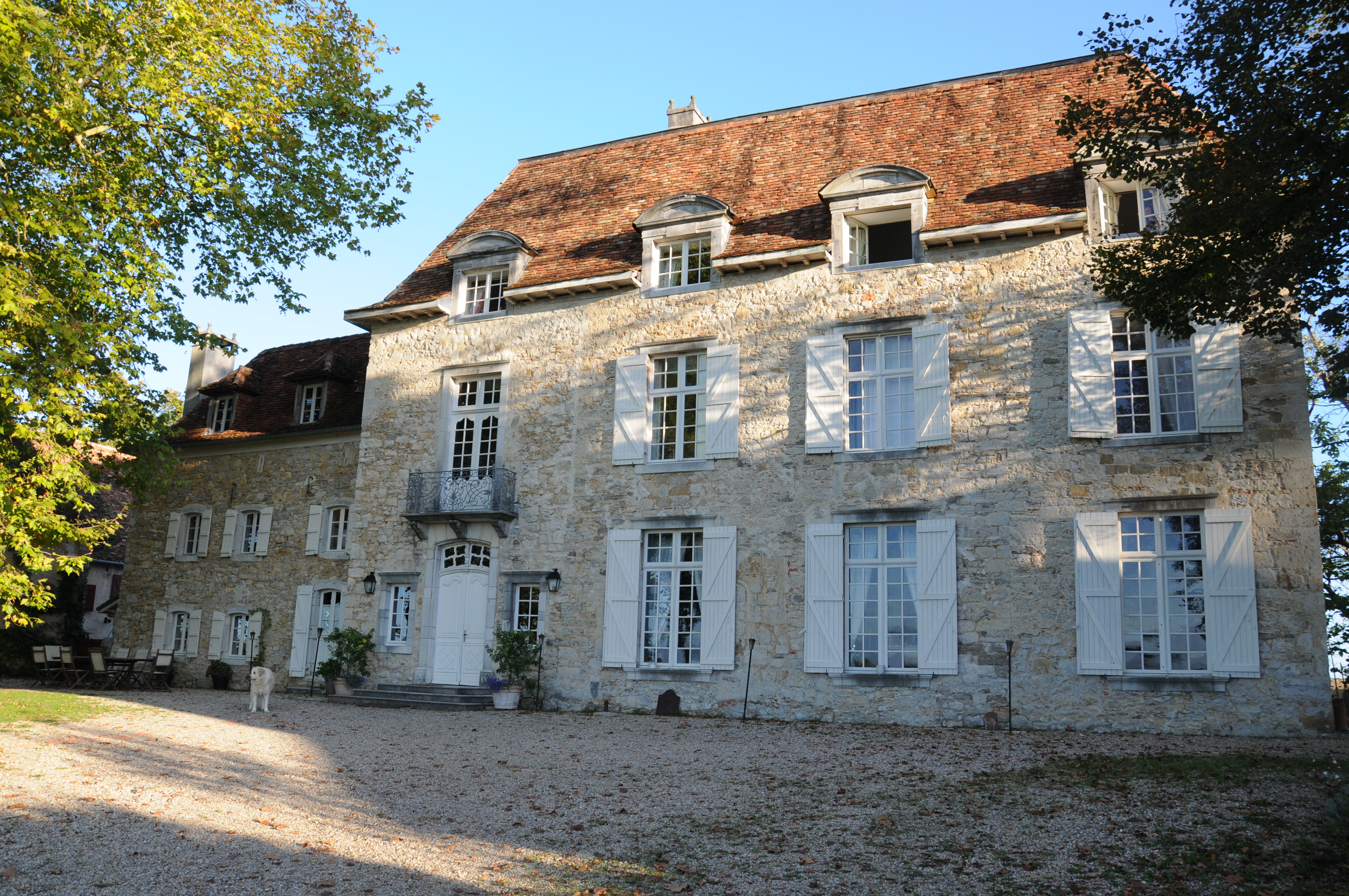
Château d'Orion

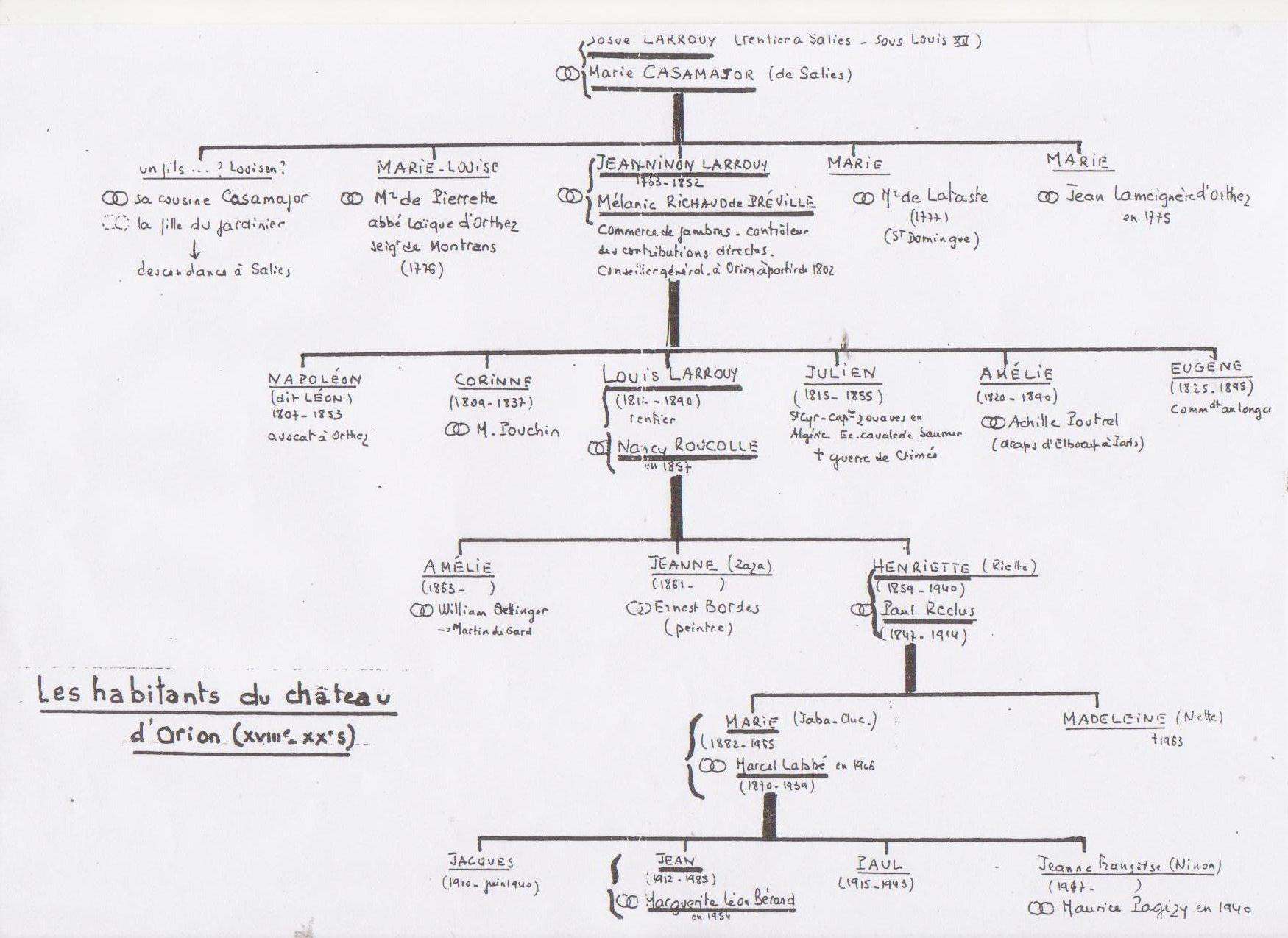
Inhabitants of the Château d'Orion (18th to 20th century)

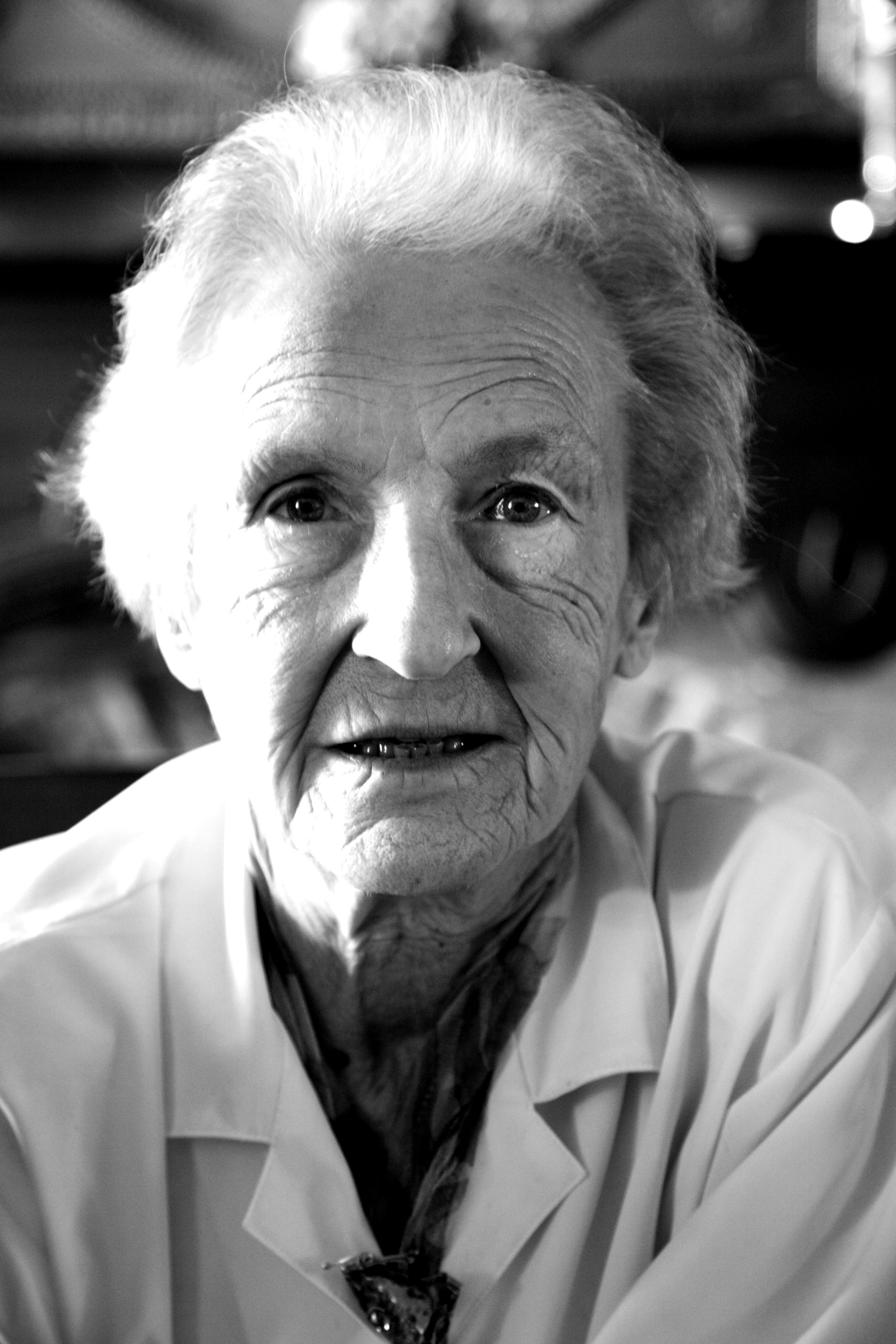
Marguerite Labbé

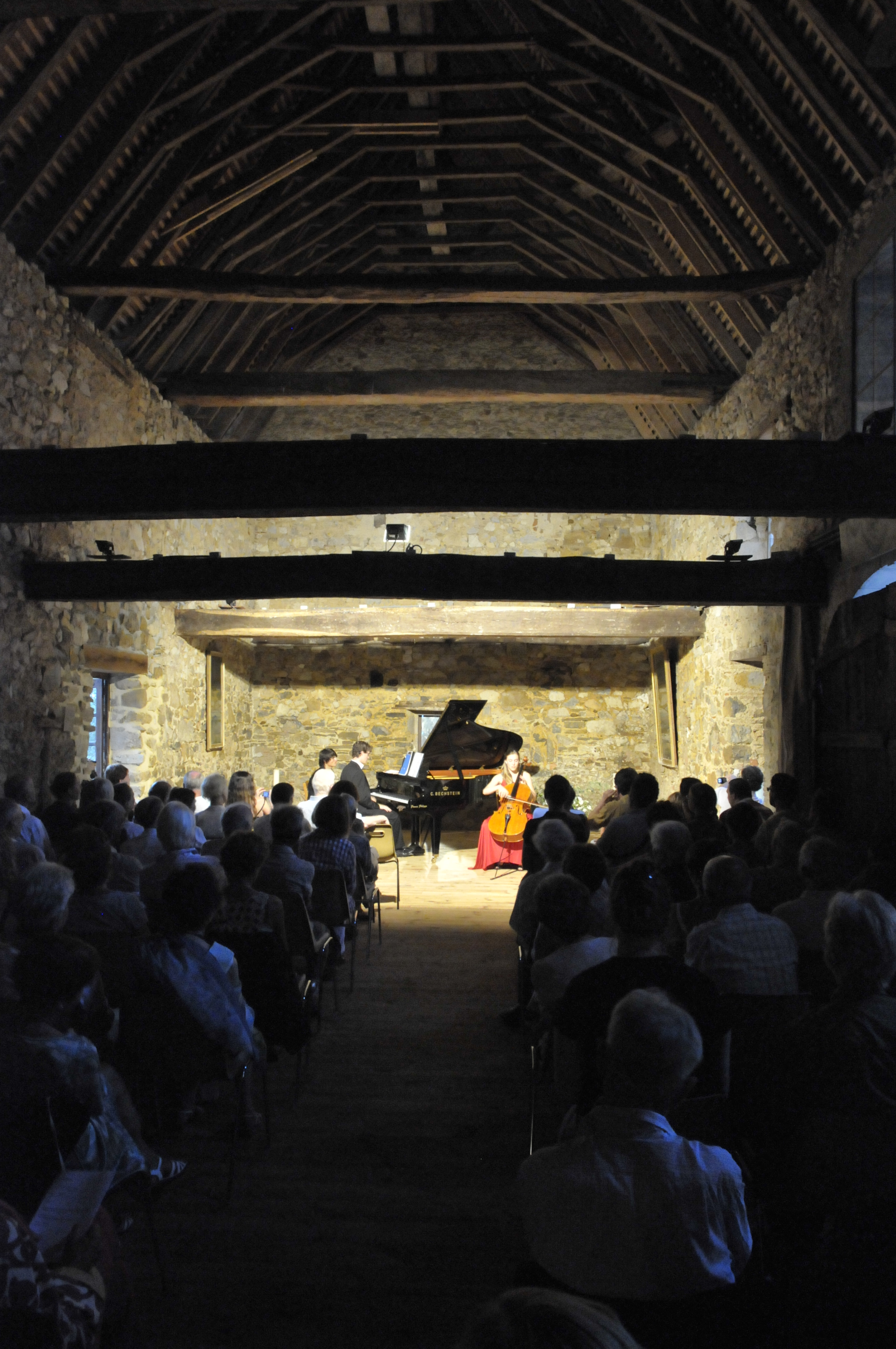
Nadège Rochat and Florian Noack

The Château d'Orion is a guesthouse and event location in the small town of Orion, Pyrénées-Atlantiques, in south-western France. It was built in the 17th century as a manor house.

== History ==
Château d'Orion is a typical Béarnaise manor house which has been enlarged and extended over the years. In 2003, the house was completely renovated, preserving many original features and furnishings that can be seen throughout the year. Originally built as a lay abbey, from the 17th century to the French Revolution, the former owners of the château, the Casamayor family, looked after the nearby church. Following them, the family of Jean-Ninon Larrouy bought the property. Their wealth was based on trading the famous Bayonne ham.

Through the heirs Louis and afterwards Henriette Larrouy, the manor came into the possession of the famous French surgeon Paul Reclus. In Paris, he carried out experiments with cocaine as an anaesthetic and he invented the Pommade de Reclus. The French writer Henri de Régnier dedicated a sonnet to Reclus' daughter, Madeleine, which says, "I love your house that bears a name of a star which lightens your eyes."

Paul Reclus' brothers were also well-established characters at that time. Élisée Reclus was one of the most famous anarchists in France and a world-famous geographer, and Armand Reclus played a part as an engineer of the Panama Canal.

His descendant Jean Labbé married Marguerite Bérard, the daughter of a former education secretary of France, Léon Bérard, in the 1950s. Madame Labbé still lives in the Château d'Orion.

== Château d'Orion today ==
The grounds extend to 30 hectares. Since the house was purchased by the German Premauer family in 2003, much of the château has been renovated and renewed. The company Château d'Orion runs the manor as a guesthouse and event location.

A local association organizes events at regular intervals, including readings, concerts and other cultural events, to preserve Château d'Orion as a social and cultural center of this region.

It received the European Citizen's Prize from the European Parliament in 2013, and other awards.

== Picture gallery ==
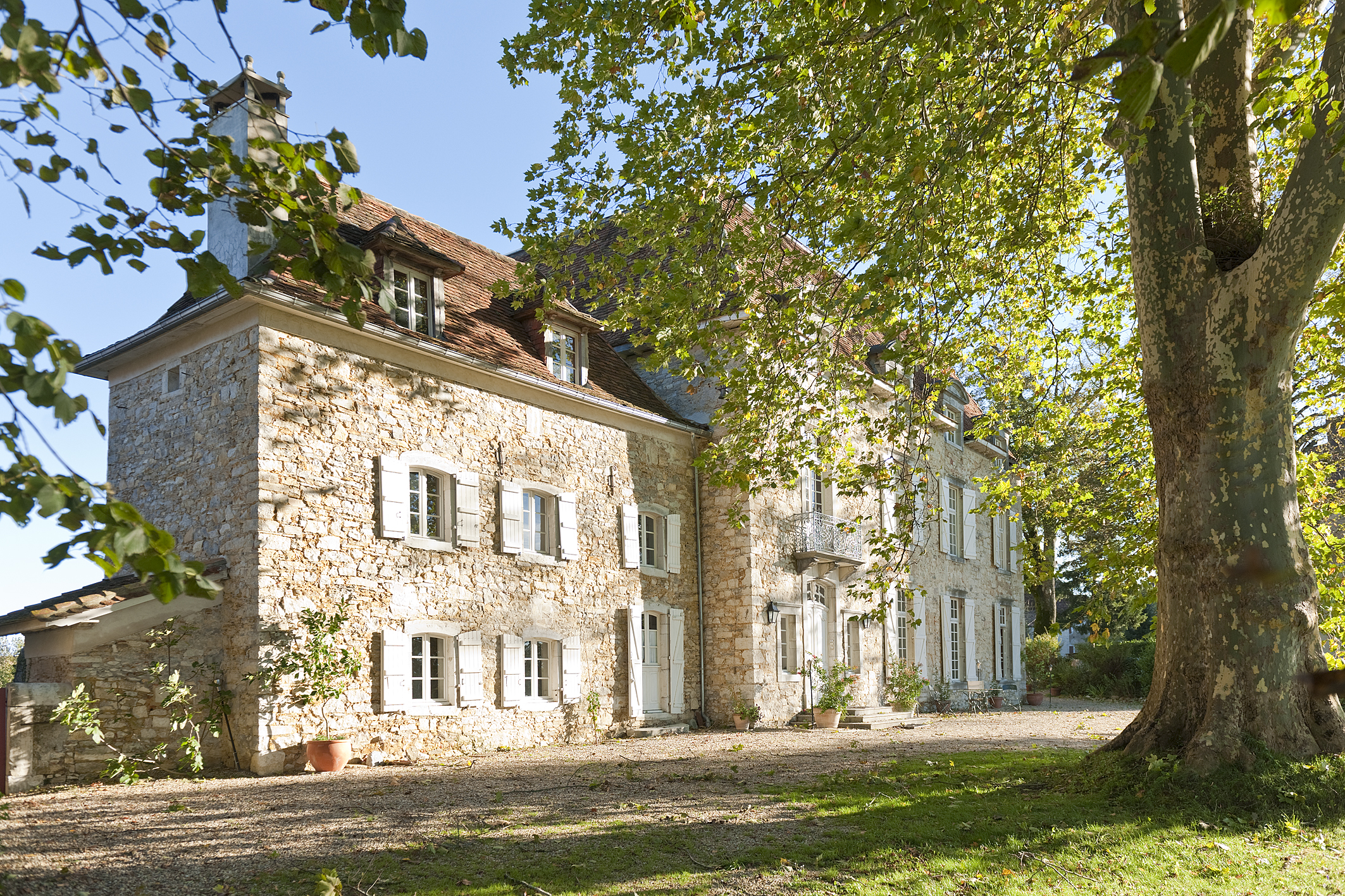
South side

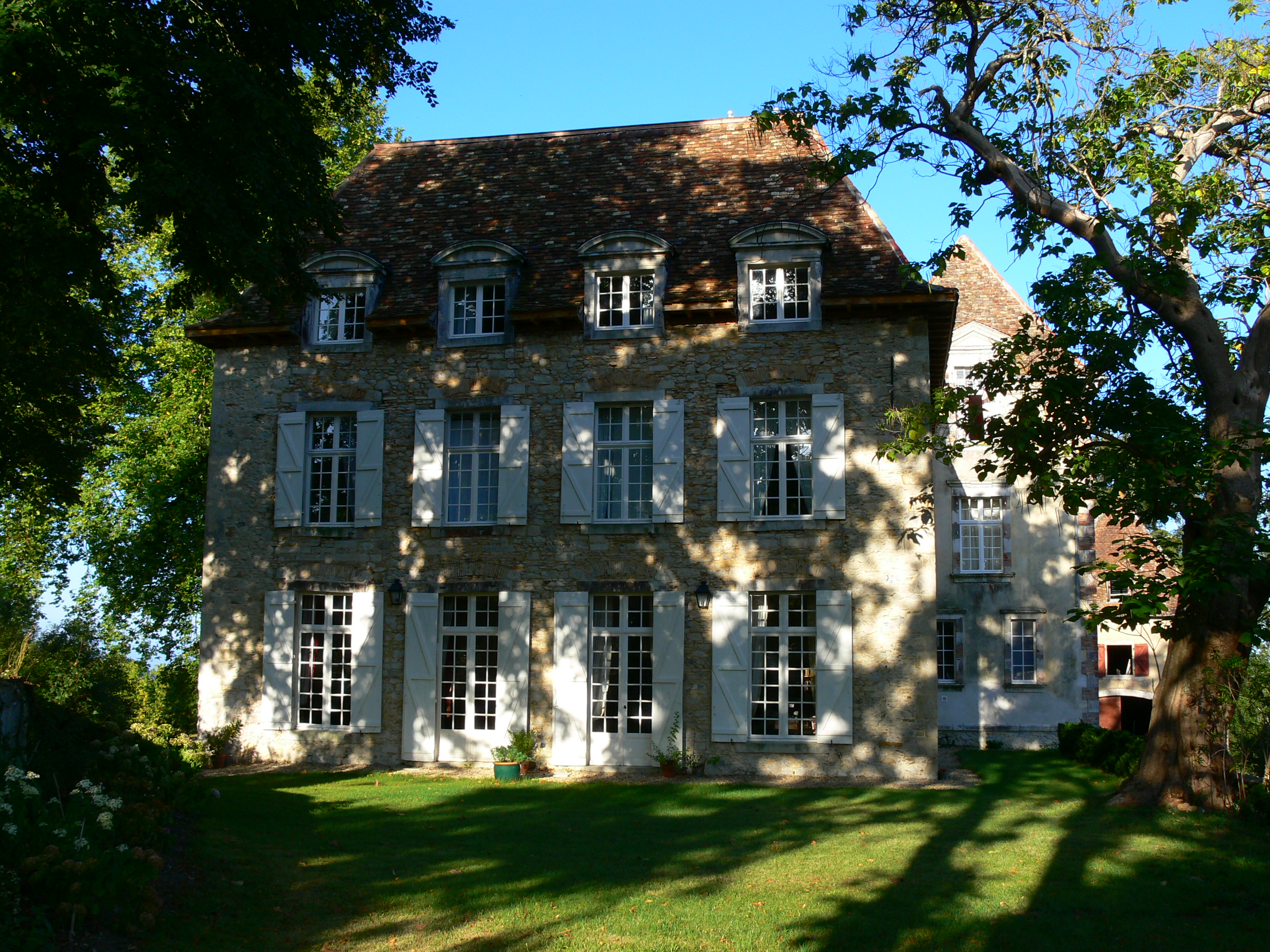
East side

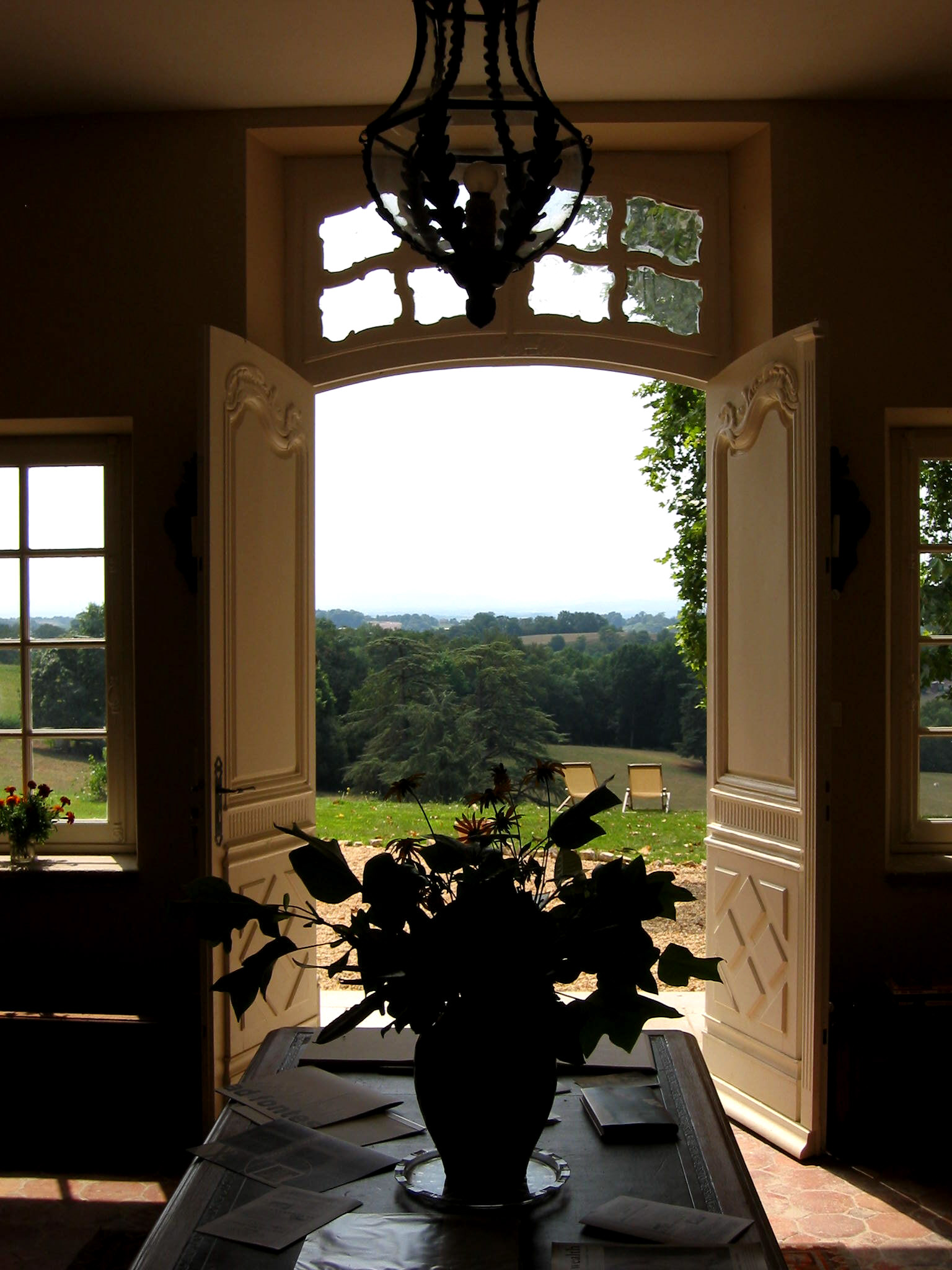
Entrance hall

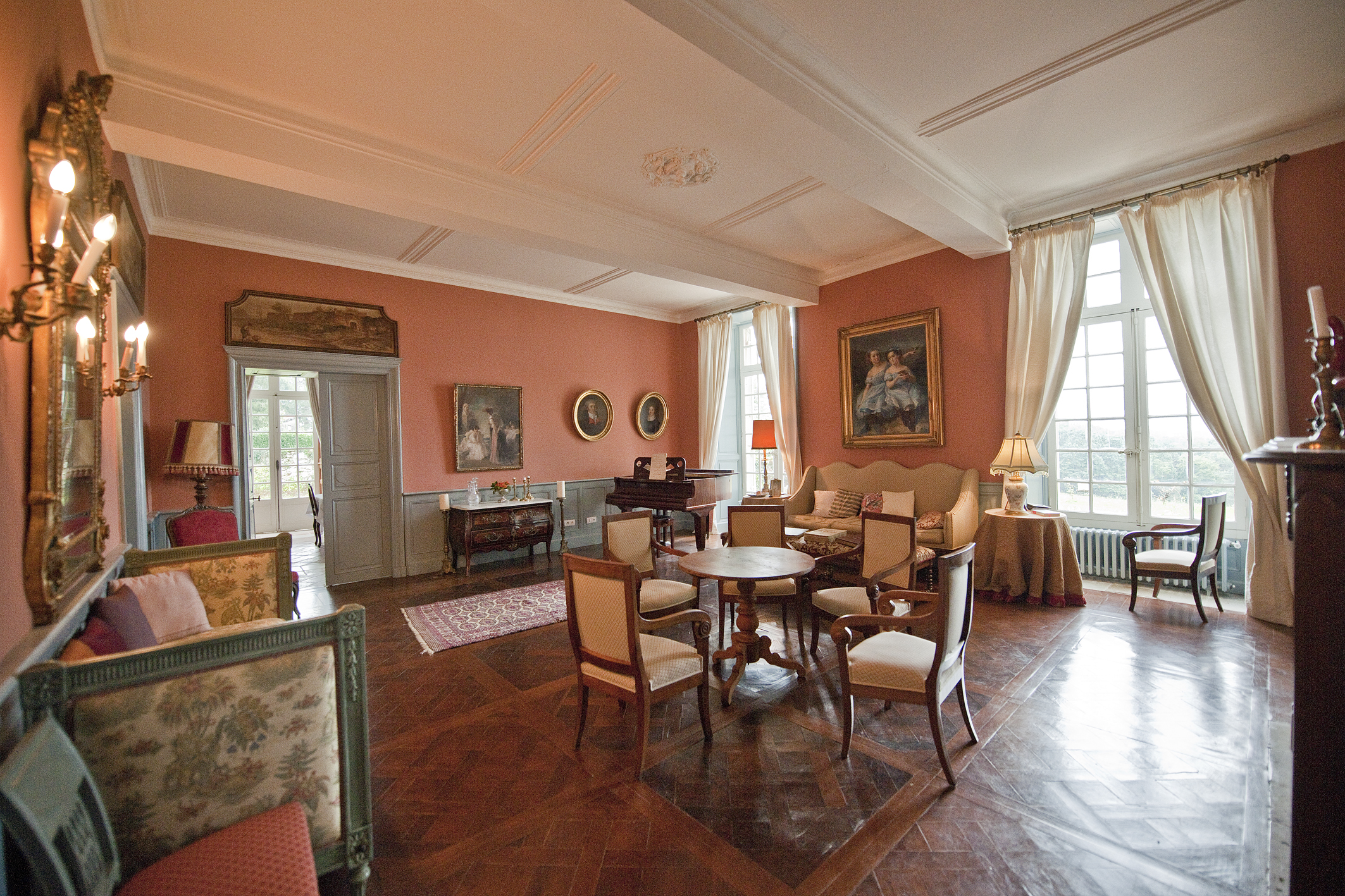
Grand Salon

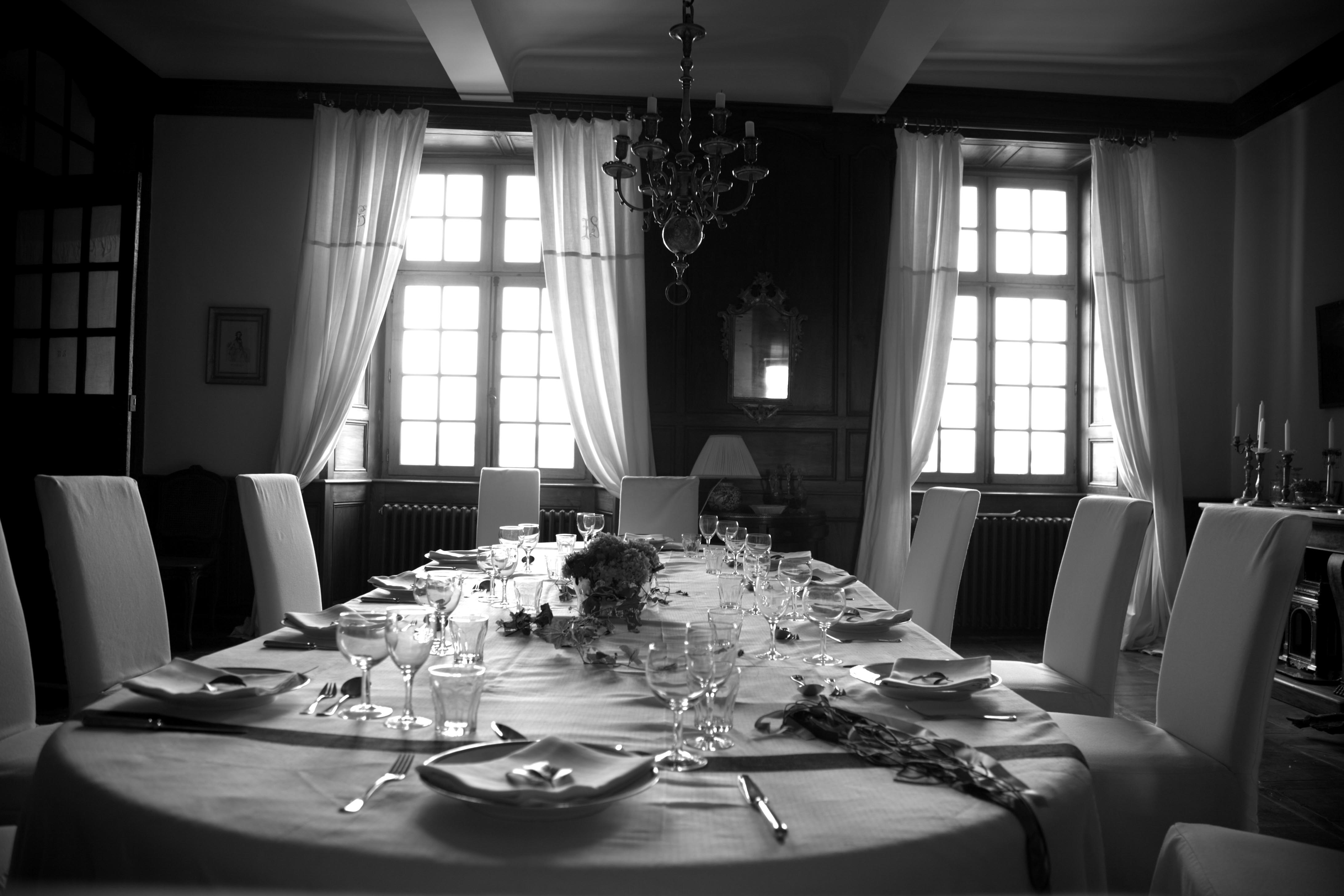
Dining room

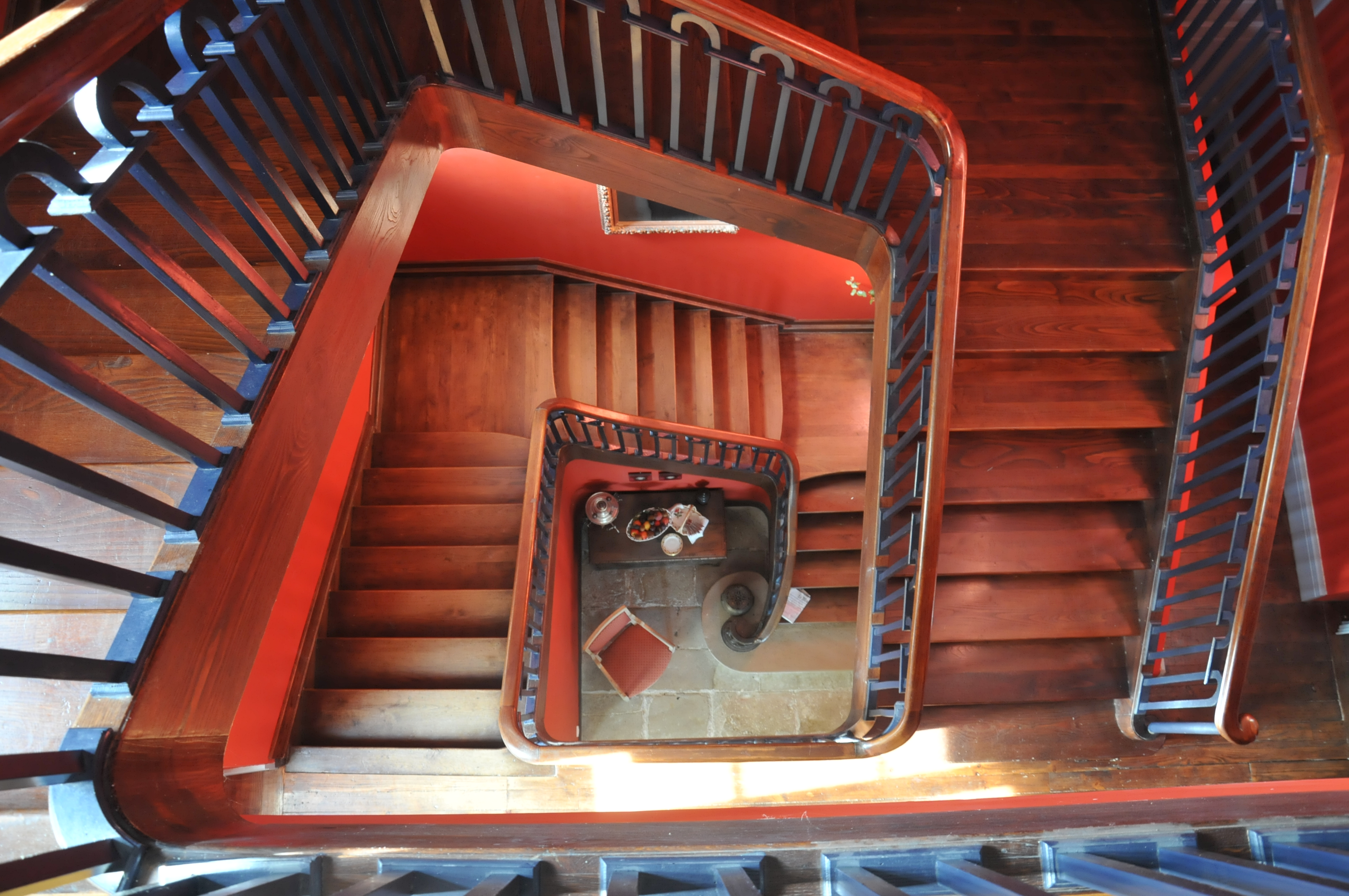
Stairway

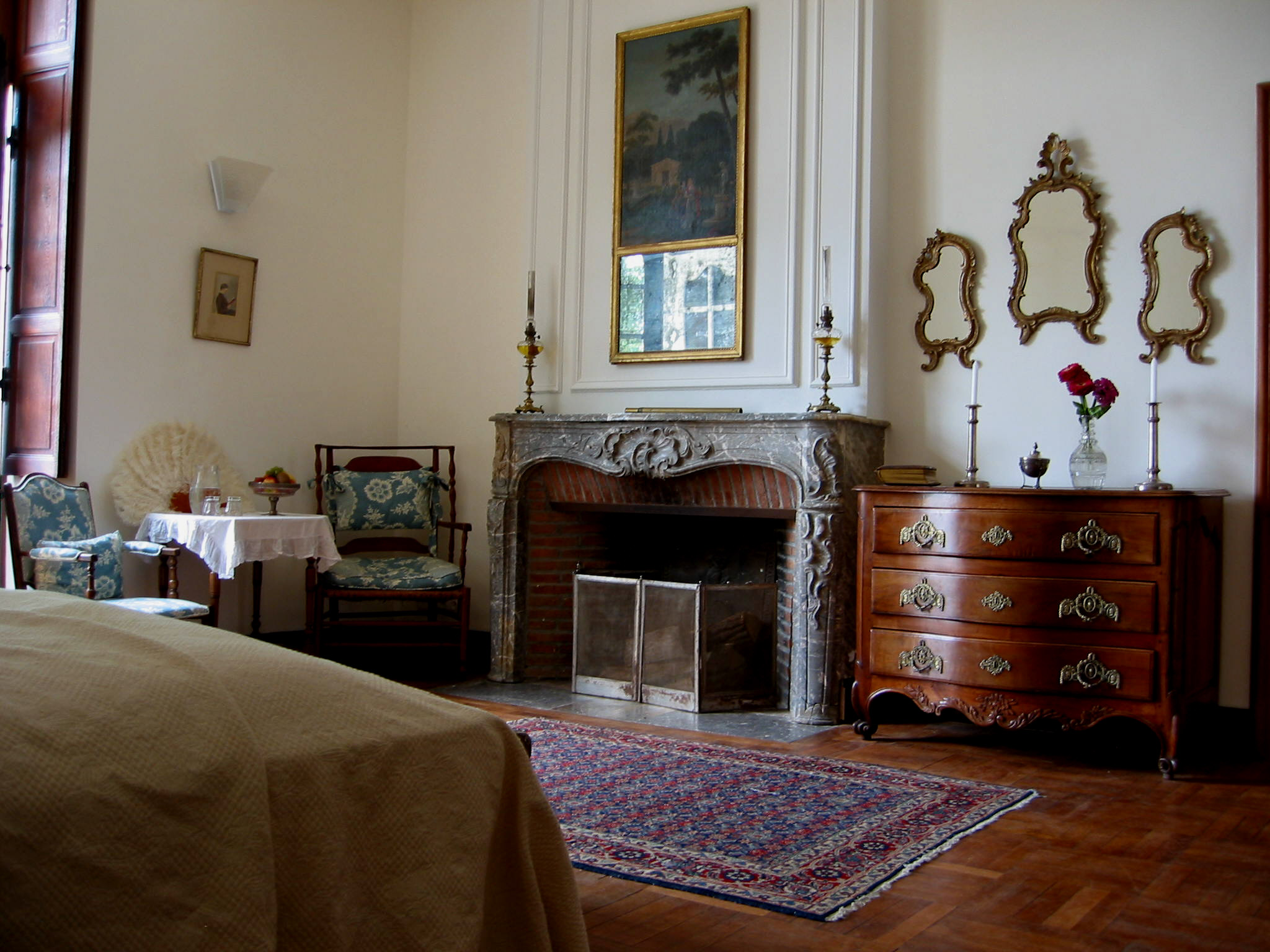
The "Casamayor" room

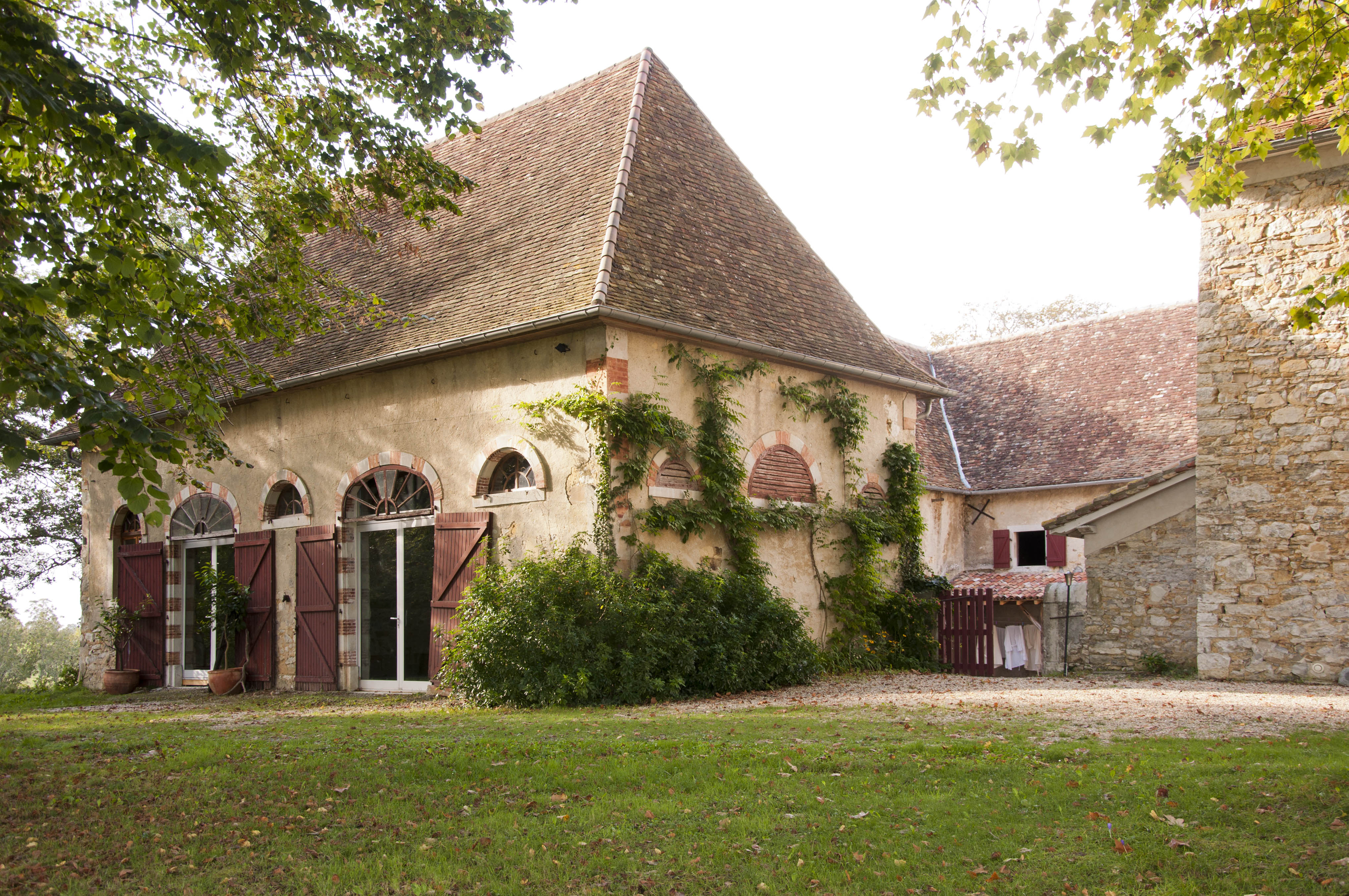
The barn
