= Emile Mollard =

Émile Achille Marie Mollard
- Born: 23 August 1895; Saint-Cloud, France
- Died: 16 October 1991 (aged 96); Paris, France
- Military career
- Allegiance: France
- Branch: French Army
- Service years: 1914–1953
- Rank: Général de division
- Unit: Cavalry
- Conflicts: World War I, World War II
- Awards: Grand Cross of the Legion of Honour; Croix de Guerre 1914–1918; Croix de Guerre 1939–1945; Medal of French Resistance with Rosette; Polish Cross of Valor

Émile Achille Marie Mollard (23 August 1895 – 16 October 1991) was a French general and a resistance fighter who played a key role in the concealment of military equipment during the early days of the Armée d'armistice.

Émile Mollard volunteered for military service on 7 November 1914, joining the 20th Dragoon Regiment. In 1916, he attended the École spéciale militaire de Saint-Cyr and was later assigned to the 12th Dragoon Regiment as a second lieutenant. During World War I, he was cited for bravery and promoted to Knight of the Legion of Honour.

In 1935, Mollard joined the Armament and Technical Studies Section under General Bloch. He created the CDM which stood variously for "Concealing Military Equipment" or ""Camouflage of Equipment", an illegal organization within the Vichyite Armistice Army that oversaw clandestine stockpiles of weapons and vehicles.

In 1943 he founded the Maurice Network which was dedicated to helping Allied military personnel escape. On 7 September 1943, Mollard was arrested by the Gestapo and deported to the Buchenwald concentration camp, where he remained until 24 April 1945. After his arrest the network was named in his honour as one of his pseudonyms was Maurice. His son, Lieutenant Roger Mollard, was also deported but did not survive.

Mollard started in 1914 as a Dragoon, ending the war as Second lieutenant. In 1938 he became a Squadron leader. Under the Vichy regime be became Lieutenant colonel and then Colonel. In 1946 he became a Brigadier general and just before his retirement in 1953 he became General of division. He concluded his career as the commander of the Material Application School and was promoted to Grand Cross of the Legion of Honour in 1961.

Mollard died on 16 October 1991 in Paris and was interred in Penne-d'Agenais, where a street was named in his honor.
