= AGRIF =

French Catholic association

Alliance Générale contre le Racisme et pour le respect de l'Identité Française et chrétienne
- Founded: 1984; 42 years ago
- Founders: Bernard Antony
- Type: Association loi de 1901
- Purpose: Defend Christian and French values
- Location: 70 Boulevard Saint-Germain, 75005 Paris
- Region served: France
- Website: lagrif.fr

The General Alliance against Racism and for Respect for French and Christian Identity (French: Alliance générale contre le racisme et pour le respect de l'identité française et chrétienne; AGRIF) is a French organization that fights against speech it considers to violate French hate speech laws by being hateful towards Christians or the French people. Recognized as an anti racism organization by the French court system, the organization has brought several cases before court and won a few cases in the Court of Cassation in the 1990s, but has had little legal success more recently. On February 14, 2023, the Global Project Against Hate and Extremism (GPAHE) released a report in which it classified l'AGRIF as an "anti-muslim" group.

== Background ==
A change to the Law on the Freedom of the Press of 29 July 1881 in 1972 outlawed hate speech and gave anti-racist organizations the right to bring charges in such cases. The provision, known as Loi Pleven, was generally understood to protect vulnerable minorities and all cases brought before the Court of Cassation (France) before 1993 involving minorities, but the law was written in race neutral language.

== History ==
Following electoral successes for Jean Marie Le Pen and Front National (FN), AGRIF was started by a member of the European Parliament for FN, Bernard Antony, in 1984 to fight against what the organization referred to as anti-French and anti-Christian racism. Antony was a leader for the traditionalist Catholic and integrist fraction of FN. He later left the party in 2008 and ran unsuccessfully for Party of France the following year.

After a legal waiting period after establishment of five years, AGRIF brought a case for recognition as an anti-racism organization for court in 1989. A tribunal court in Paris initially refused to accept the organization's legal standing as it didn't consider it a legitimate anti-racism organization, but this decision was overturned by the appellate court of Paris and, on 16 April 1991, the Court of Cassation recognized AGRIF as having legal standing as an anti-racism organization, stressing the neutral language of the hate speech regulation that the court found did not exclude non-majority groups like French people and Christians from being possible subjects of punishable racism.

== Court cases ==
AGRIF sued writer Marek Halter and the Le Figaro for defamation against Catholics for an assertion in the newspaper by Halter that the Catholic churches in Eastern Europe were "archaic, xenophobic, often racist and anti-semitic." The appellate court of Paris acquitted Halter and Le Figaro on the basis that the statement only referred to some Catholic churches at a certain place and time and did not refer to Catholicism itself. The case came for the Court of Cassation in 1993. AGRIF referred to a 1991 Court of Cassation decision where the court had found that accusations that American Jews exploited Holocaust for their own interest constituted hate speech against Jews even if the statement only referred to a sub-group of Jews, and argued that this also meant that statements that only targeted part of the Catholic community could constitute hate speech. The Court of Cassation, citing both its 1991 decision on AGRIF and its 1991 decision on American Jews, ruled that Halter's statement about the Eastern Churches targeted Christians in Eastern Europe in a way that violated the hate speech provision. After a retrial at the appellate court of Orleans where Halter and Le Figaro were found guilty of defamation of Catholics, the Court of Cassation upheld the conviction in 1995.

In the mid-1990s, AGRIF also got the support of the Court of Cassation in three other cases of alleged anti-Catholic hate speech, including one case against Charlie Hebdo.

After that time however, the Court of Cassation would mostly rule against AGRIF. Legal experts attribute this to a legal reform that made it easier to appeal decision to the European Court of Human Rights (ECHR) which more strongly tended to rule in favor of free speech, and did not typically interpret hate speech law to protect majority groups. In the 2006 Giniewski v. France case, the ECHR in a chamber judgement ruled that a civil case decision by the Orléans Court of Appeal upheld by the Court of Cassation where Paul Giniewski had been obligated to pay one Franc to AGRIF as damage for implying Veritatis splendor could be linked to the Holocaust violated Article 10 of the European Convention on Human Rights.

The organization lost a case in a tribunal court in Avignon against Collection Lambert where AGRIF had demanded that Lambert removed a print version of the photograph Piss Christ as well as an internet version. AGRIF was instead ordered to pay Lambert 8000 euros for filing a prejudiced lawsuit. The poster had been vandalized by unknown persons before the case was decided.

In 2016, a Paris tribunal court acquitted Femen on accusations of causing harm against Christians after they interrupted a demonstration against same-sex marriage with slogans saying "Fuck Church" among other things.

== Organization ==
The organization publishes a quarterly bulletin, La Griffe, and maintains links with the far-right newspaper Présent. For instance, Jeanne Smits previously held the positions of vice-president of AGRIF and publication director of Présent at the same time.

== Sources ==
- Barraband, Mathilde; Camus, Jean-Yves (2020). "Le combat culturel des traditionalistes catholiques. L'affaire Golgotha picnic, un coup de force ?". COnTEXTES (26). doi:10.4000/contextes.8733. ISSN 1783-094X.
- Bleich, Erik (2018), "Historical institutionalism and Judicial decision-making: Ideas, institutions, and actors in French High court Hate speech rulings" (PDF), World Politics, 70 (1): 53–85, doi:10.1017/s0043887117000272, S2CID 158916987(subscription required)
