= Maurice Network =

The Maurice Network (Réseau Maurice) was a French resistance network established during World War II by the Camouflage du Matériel (CDM). It played a vital role in intelligence gathering and facilitating the escape of military personnel and allied aviators from Nazi-occupied France to Africa and allied territories.

== History ==
The network was officially created on 1 February 1943 under the leadership of General Emile Mollard, who operated under the alias "Maurice." The initiative aimed to support the Free French Forces by organizing the clandestine escape of military and civilian personnel, particularly specialists such as aviators and technicians, and gathering critical intelligence.

The network's operations included:

- Coordinating escape routes through the Pyrénées into Spain and onward to North Africa.
- Transmitting military intelligence to the Bureau Central de Renseignements et d’Action (BCRA) in Algiers.
- Organizing supply chains for material and resources critical to the war effort.

== Structure ==
The Maurice Network was divided into several regional groups, mostly on or near the border with Spain although there Maurice II was active in the Cotentin region of Normandy and Maurice VIII operated in Paris with connections to the Vichy Regime and elements of the German command in Wiesbaden.

The network had approximately 316 agents, including field operatives, intelligence couriers, and escape route guides.

== Key contributions ==
From 1943 to 1944, the Maurice Network facilitated:

- The escape of 329 French military personnel.
- The rescue of 350 Allied aviators.
- Support for numerous Polish military personnel and Spanish guerrillas.

The headquarters of the network initially operated in Monferran-Savès, near Toulouse, under the protection of local officials, including Henri Matet, the mayor. Religious figures, including Sister Paulaine of the Saint Joseph Orphanage, played pivotal roles in concealing fugitives and aiding escapes.

== Losses and legacy ==
The network suffered significant losses, with 61 agents arrested and 33 deported. Of these, 11 died in detention or were executed. Despite these sacrifices, the Maurice Network is credited with invaluable contributions to the French Resistance, supporting Allied forces and preserving the honor of France during its darkest hours. It was named the Maurice network due to the pseudonym of its founder, the French officer Emile "Maurice" Mollard.

After his arrest the network was named in his honour as one of his pseudonyms was Maurice.

Due to heavy losses it was integrated in April 1944 into the Alibi Network.

A commemorative plaque in Monferran-Savès honors the memory of the network's members and their sacrifices.
