= Klan Network =

- Réseau Klan
- Formation: 1942
- Founder: François de La Rocque
- Dissolved: 1944
- Purpose: Intelligence gathering
- Region served: Occupied France
- Affiliations: Parti social français (PSF), Réseau Alibi

The Klan Network (1942–1944) was a French Resistance network specializing in intelligence gathering. It was established in 1942 by Colonel François de La Rocque within the framework of the Parti social français (PSF).

== History ==
The Klan Network was founded in 1942 by Colonel François de La Rocque and the leadership of the Parti social français (PSF), which had been transformed after 1940 into a social welfare organization under the name Progrès social français.

Klan was considered a sub-network of the Réseau Alibi, led by Georges Charaudeau. It provided intelligence, via Alibi, to the Secret Intelligence Service (SIS) in Britain, which commended the network twice for its efforts.

The network was disrupted following the arrest of the PSF leadership and the deportation of Colonel François de La Rocque in 1943. His arrest by the Gestapo in March 1943 "did not halt social activities or the collection of military intelligence. In the occupied zone, Professor Pierre Lépine, who had connections with American intelligence networks, succeeded Noël Ottavi in managing the Progrès social français until the Liberation. He notably developed an independent intervention plan for the PSF during the operations of August 1944. However, individual choices ultimately dictated participation".

== Actions of the Klan Network ==
Professor Pierre Lépine, one of the PSF leaders in the northern zone and a key figure in the Klan Network, described several of its actions:

- "In 1942–1943, I received intelligence reports from all the ADP (NB: Auxiliaires de la défense passive, a civic action branch of the PSF) every Tuesday. These reports were microfilmed in my laboratory at the Pasteur Institute on Wednesday and sent out on Thursday. It is likely that the documents left France through Spain. This was at least the route used to transmit photographs of the fortifications of the Atlantic Wall across the entire Seine basin".
- "Guérillot, EVP (NB: PSF member) of the 11th arrondissement, with the support of the PSF in Mantes, provided Georges Riché with a sample of a detergent used in producing an oxygen derivative manufactured in a German factory in Mantes (linked to their atomic research at the time). This sample was immediately forwarded to the Allies. After the war, I received thanks from an American general at the Pentagon, who personally commended me for the quality of the information gathered during the occupation".
- In Lyon, Professor Hermann from the Faculty of Medicine coordinated intelligence sources.

== Sources ==
- Nobécourt, Jacques (1996). Le colonel de La Rocque, ou les pièges du nationalisme chrétien (in French). Paris: Fayard. ISBN 9782213596877.
- Lépine, Pierre (1998). Fiches de renseignement. Archives CHEVS (in French). FNSP.
- Nobécourt, Jacques (1999). "Communication à l'Académie de Rouen". ALR (in French) (61).
