= Georges Charaudeau =

- Born: June 23, 1901; Châtellerault, France
- Died: December 9, 1990 (aged 89); Pau, France
- Occupations: Journalist, Businessman, Spy, Resistance fighter
- Notable work: Alibi Network

Georges Charaudeau (June 23, 1901 – December 9, 1990) was a French Resistance fighter, journalist, businessman, and spy. He was among the first resistance members during World War II and was the founder and leader of the Alibi Network within the French Resistance.

In civilian life, Charaudeau contributed to the development of French motor racing, leading several media outlets, associations, and sports federations. He also played a significant role in modernizing the Pau Grand Prix in 1933.

== Early life ==
Born in Châtellerault, Charaudeau spent his early years working with his father in the food industry. A devout Catholic, he briefly joined the Christian Democrats but maintained political independence to safeguard his judgment.

Charaudeau was passionate about motorsport and played a pivotal role in bringing the French Grand Prix to his hometown of Pau. In 1933, he helped design a new Pau Circuit and became the secretary-general of the Automobile Club Basco-Béarnais, overseeing the second edition of the Pau Grand Prix.

== Early resistance activities ==
In 1936, driven by his opposition to dictatorships, Charaudeau began undertaking missions for the Deuxième Bureau of the French intelligence services. He also established ties with the British MI6 during his time in Spain. After the June 22, 1940 armistice, he founded the Alibi Network, which supplied intelligence to MI6 from 1940 to 1944.

== Post-liberation career ==
A close friend of Edmond Michelet, Charaudeau joined the Ministry of War as a special advisor after France's liberation. He later worked with the Ministry of Veterans Affairs.

From 1945 to 1960, he held numerous roles: - Administrator at L'Équipe, - Board member of Air Liquide, - Secretary-General and later Vice-President of the French Federation of Motorsport (FFSA). He organized Formula 1 events for teams such as Maserati, Ferrari, and Gordini.

In 1960, Charaudeau became the general director of the legal journal "Petites Affiches" and contributed significantly to the reform of France’s corporate legal code.

== Retirement and death ==
Charaudeau retired to his childhood city of Pau in 1975, where he died in December 1990. He remained a traditionalist Catholic to his death.
