= Présent (newspaper) =

French newspaper (1982–2022)

- Type: Daily newspaper
- Publisher: Jeanne Smits
- Founded: 1982
- Ceased publication: June 30, 2022
- Language: French
- Headquarters: Paris
- Website: http://www.present.fr/

Présent was a French newspaper that was published five days a week. The paper was founded in 1982. It was close to the French Front National, and followed a traditionalist Catholic editorial line. Jean Madiran was for long its editor in chief.

The paper ceased publication in June 2022.
