= Saint-Jacques network =

French resistance network

The Saint-Jacques network (French: Réseau Saint-Jacques) was the first French resistance network of World War II. It was founded by Maurice Duclos - whose codename was Saint-Jacques - and operated under the auspices of Charles de Gaulle's Free France in London.

== History ==
=== Début with Free France ===
Following his experience in the Norwegian campaign of 1940, Duclos' unit returned to Brittany but was surrounded by Nazi forces at Plénée-Jugon on 17 June. With some colleagues he escaped via Jersey on a fishing boat, reaching England on 21 June, just as France signed the armistice with the Nazis. On 1 July, he joined de Gaulle's Free French in London as a deputy to André Dewavrin. Duclos suggested Paris station names as codenames; he chose Saint Jacques for himself, Dewavrin became colonel Passy, Gilbert Renault became Rémy, Pierre Fourcaud (Dewavrin's other deputy) became Barbès and Duclos' friend Alexandre Beresnikoff became Corvisart, amongst others.

=== Implementation of the network ===
Duclos and Beresnikoff landed off a dinghy released from a Royal Navy launch at Saint-Aubin-sur-Mer, Calvados, on the evening of 4 August, with plans to assess the possibility of Adolf Hitler invading England. They sank their dinghy and went along the coast carrying a basket of carrier pigeons, securing themselves in a crevice under a Nazi guard post. They entered Saint-Aubin and went on their separate missions. Duclos reconnoitred by bicycle. He collected information on Nazi positions between Honfleur and Isigny. Without permission, he recruited a local civil engineer, Félix Bruneau, to operate an "action sector" to create a climate of insecurity amongst the Wehrmacht. He went to Paris, where he created the Saint-Jacques network at his own premises at the Place Vendôme. In mid-August, he asked disaffected commandant Jean Vérines, a veteran of World War I, to be his lieutenant; Vérines' son, Guy, also joined the Saint-Jacques network. Between them, they recruited large numbers from La Garde (republican guards), gendarmes and sapeurs-pompiers (army fire crews) across northern France. Duclos also laid plans for the Paris Job network and then helped Renault to found the Confrérie Notre-Dame network.

=== Consolidation and Vichy contacts ===
He met a former colleague from La Cagoule, journalist Gabriel Jeantet, who was now director of propaganda in the Vichy régime. Jeantet introduced him to others in the regime and contacts were maintained for the duration of the Nazi occupation. Duclos crossed between the Zone occupée and the Zone libre adding contacts for his networks, particularly those working in railway infrastructure and utilities such as electricity distribution. He entered Spain in November via Perpignan before returning to London on 24 December.

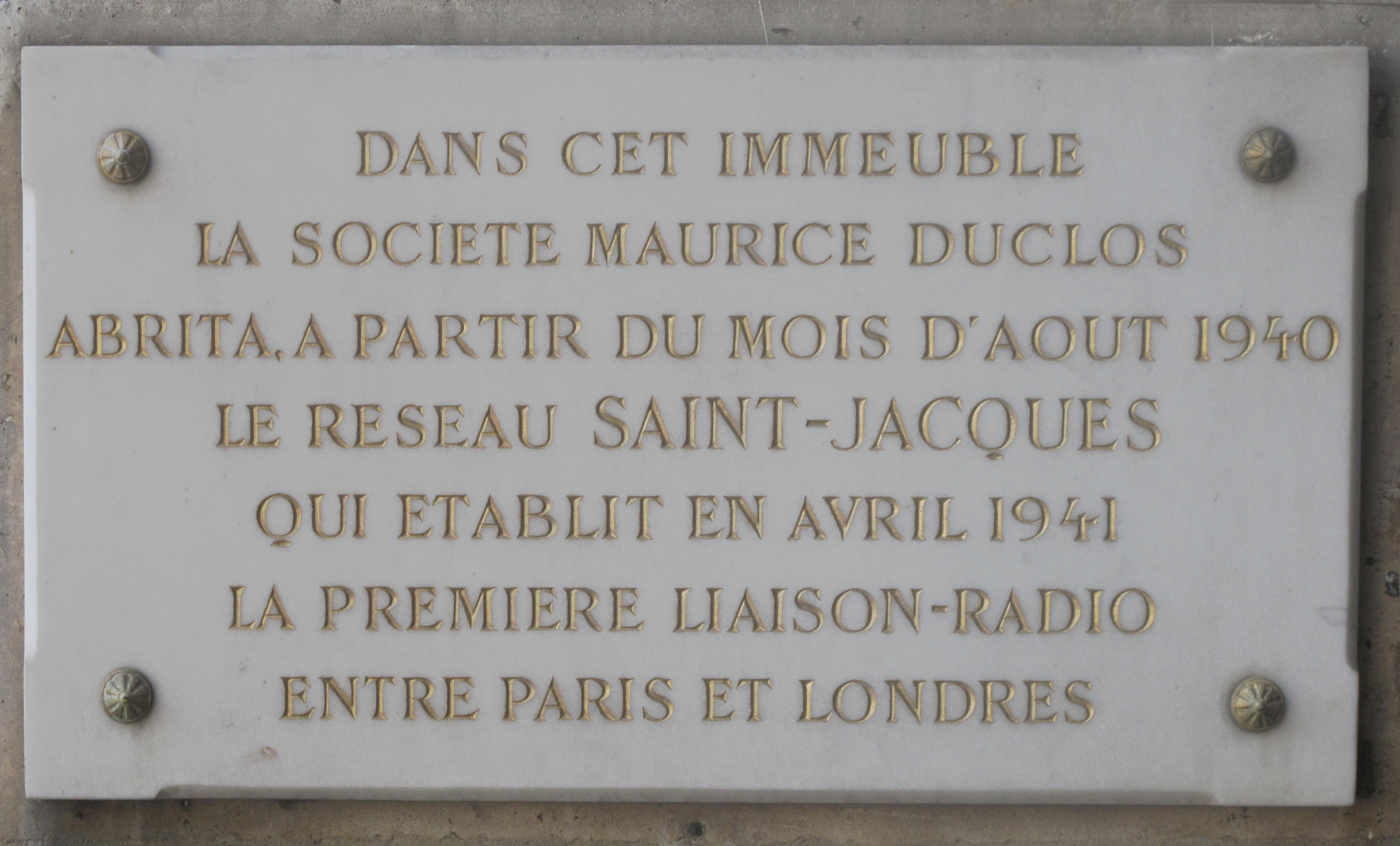
Plaque at the Hôtel Delpech de Chaunot, Paris, commemorating the first French Resistance radio link between Paris and London, created by the first Resistance network,Saint-Jacques.

His report to Dewavrin of the Vichy organisation was not as favourable as that of Fourcaud, despite the useful connexions he'd made; he did not regard Vichy staff as combative enough. Nonetheless, Dewavrin was happy that three networks had been installed. He instructed Duclos to develop the network in the region between Paris, Caen and Dunkirk to gain as much information as possible about the Armistice Commission headquartered in Wiesbaden. In February 1941, he was dropped from a bomber over the Dordogne but broke one leg and sprained the other landing in woods. He made it to a farm but the doctor called by the farmer reported him to the police. He was arrested and taken to hospital in Périgueux. Within a month he was released, with the help of Fourcaud contacting old colleagues in Vichy. He made it to the Zone occupée, aided by a contact of Renault, and in Paris by April, he set up a radio link to London.

=== Compromise and collapse ===
Vérines had become very active amongst the gendarmerie but also recruited civilians, including abbot fr:Roger Derry. From his home in Neuilly, Duclos ran his network. He took Charles Deguy as an assistant, whose job in an oil company on the Champs-Élysées provided key contacts and enabled him to cross the demarcation line with British military staff in the boot of his car. Reports were also sent by Roger Wybot from within the Vichy set-up who made links with Fourcaud and Saint-Jacques and saved many agents from arrest. Duclos went to Nantes in mid-June. He suspected his radio operator was a traitor and asked to use Renault's operator to transmit messages. Duclos' operator eventually gave details of all the Saint-Jacques members to the Nazis.

On 8 August, the Gestapo set a trap at the home of Saint-Jacques operative Marcel Halbout in Rouen, which led to the unravelling of the network through August and September. Renault evaded the trap. Duclos had only just returned from installing an antenna at Le Havre, became suspicious around Halbout's home and ended up running into woods towards the Zone libre under fire from the Germans. Halbout was transported out of France. Duclos' sister, Anne-Marie Lefèvre, was arrested with her husband, eight-year-old daughter and sixteen-year-old son and sentenced to death in April 1942. Derry and Deguy were also arrested and sentenced to death; Deguy was shot at the Forteresse du Mont-Valérien in July 1942. Derry was taken to Köln where he was decapitated with an axe in 1943. Halbout spent four years in German custody, eventually to be repatriated from Buchenwald concentration camp. Similarly, Lefèvre was liberated by the Allies in 1945. Vérines, who had become military commander of Les Invalides continued until 10 October 1941 before he was arrested. He was taken to Germany in December, sentenced to death in August 1943 and shot on 2O October.

Although the Saint-Jacques network was finished, Duclos returned to England and continued to have a significant role gathering information and sabotaging infrastructure in northern France in preparation for the Allied landings.
