= Orion, Pyrénées-Atlantiques =

Orion
- Commune
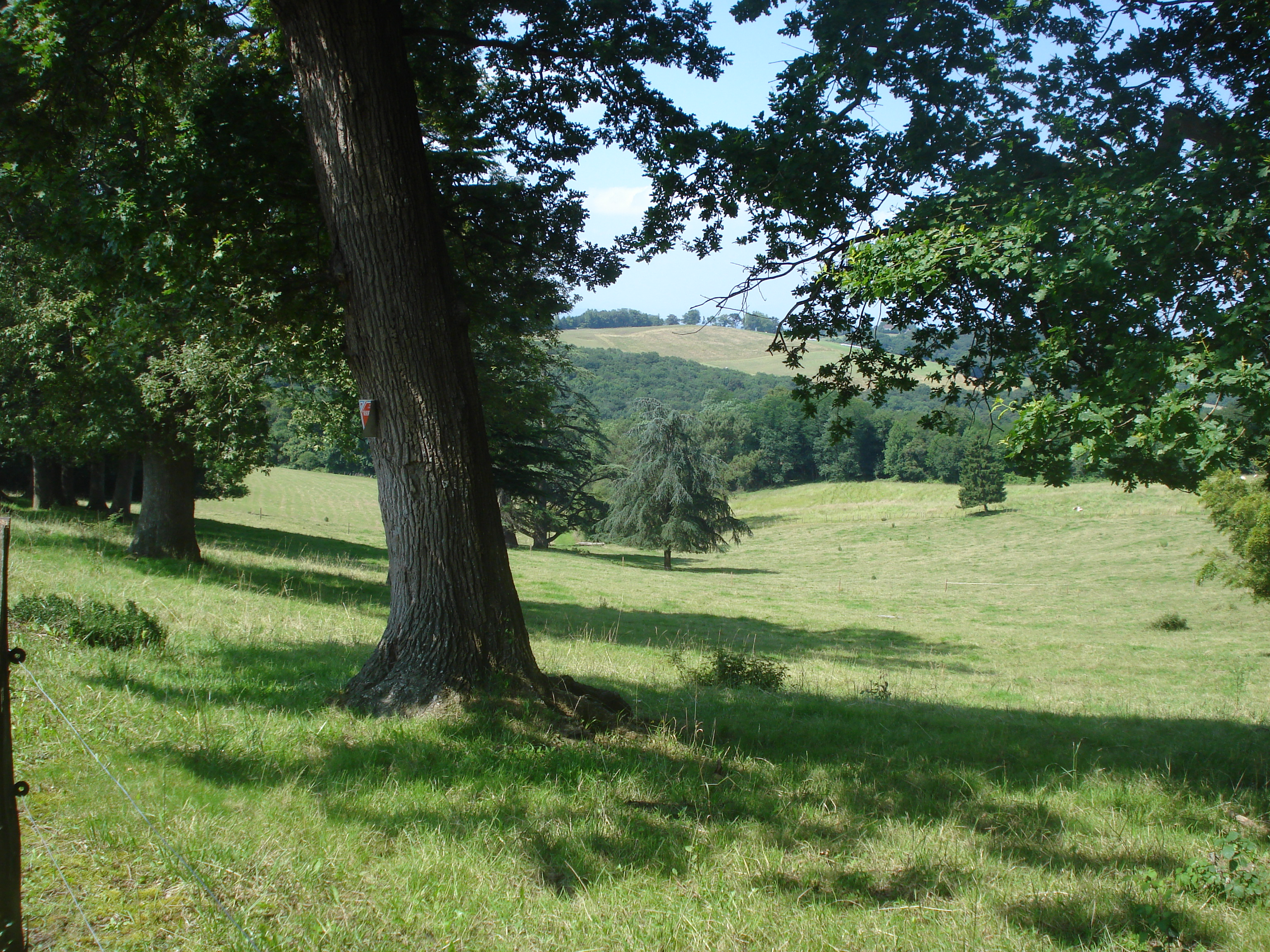
- The landscape to the east of the village
- Location of Orion
- Location within France Location within Nouvelle-Aquitaine
- Coordinates: 43°25′11″N 0°51′43″W
- Country: France
- Region: Nouvelle-Aquitaine
- Department: Pyrénées-Atlantiques
- Arrondissement: Oloron-Sainte-Marie
- Canton: Orthez et Terres des Gaves et du Sel
- Intercommunality: Béarn des Gaves

Government
  - Mayor (2020–2026): Marie-France Couture
- Area^{1}: 9.80 km^{2} (3.78 sq mi)
- Elevation: 206 m (676 ft)
- Highest elevation: 230 m (750 ft)
- Lowest elevation: 83 m (272 ft)
- Population (2023): 148
  - Density: 15.1/km^{2} (39.1/sq mi)
- Time zone: UTC+01:00 (CET)
  - Summer (DST): UTC+02:00 (CEST)
- INSEE/Postal code: 64427 /64390
- ^{1} French Land Register data, which excludes lakes, ponds, glaciers > 1 km^{2} (0.386 sq mi or 247 acres) and river estuaries.

Orion (French pronunciation: [ɔʁjɔ̃]) is a rural commune in the Pyrénées-Atlantiques department in the Nouvelle-Aquitaine region in Southwestern France. As of 2023, the population of the commune was 148.

== See also ==
- Communes of the Pyrénées-Atlantiques department
- Château d'Orion
