= Bernard Antony =

French politician

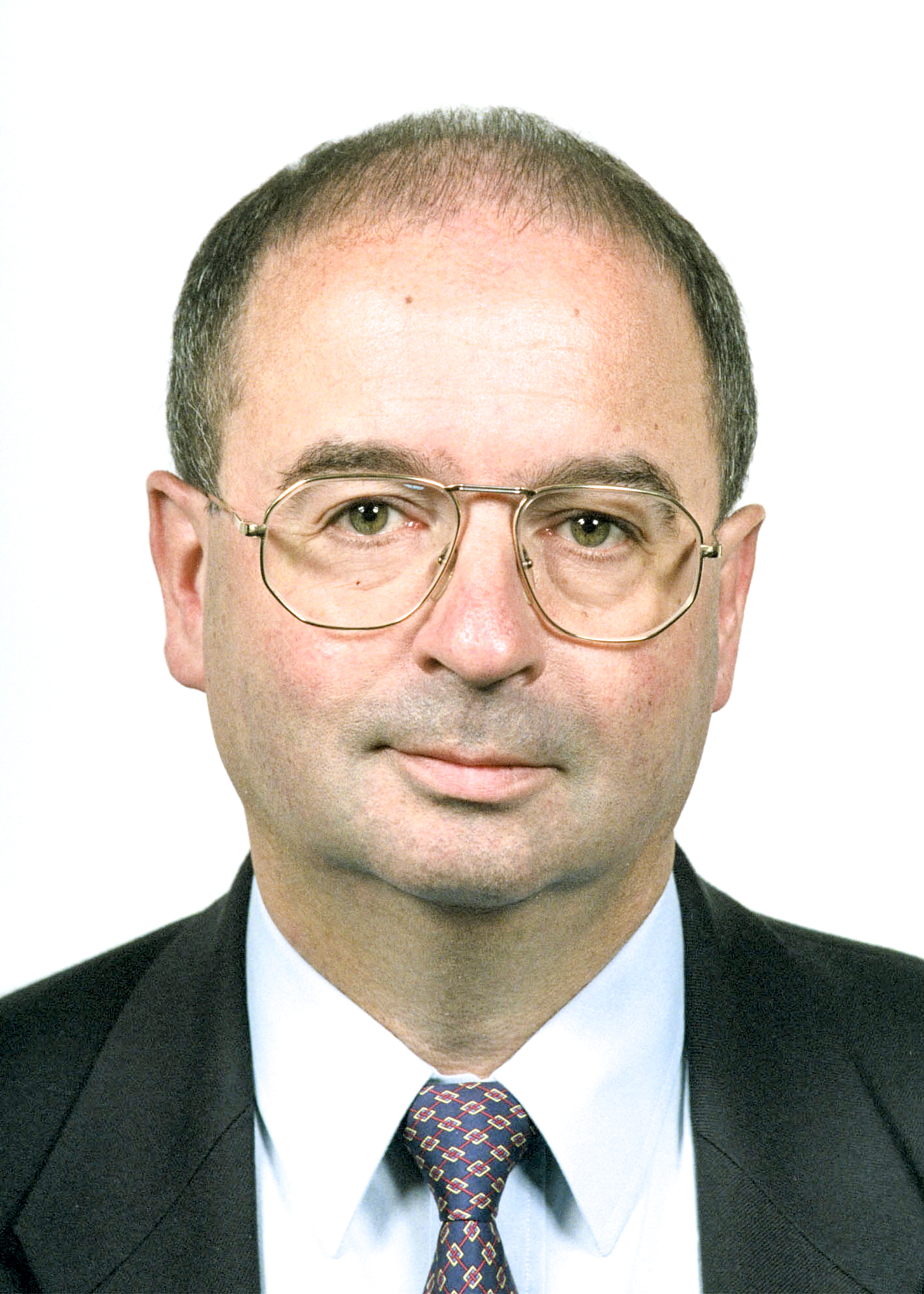
- Antony in 1994

Member of the European Parliament from France
- In office 1984–1999

Personal details
- Born: 28 November 1944 (age 80); Tarbes, France
- Political party: National Front
- Occupation: Politician

Bernard Antony (French pronunciation: [bɛʁnaʁ ɑ̃tɔni]; born 28 November 1944) is a French politician. He served as a Member of the European Parliament (MEP) from 1984 to 1999.

Antony is the president of the General Alliance against Racism and for Respect for French and Christian Identity. He is a Traditionalist Catholic.
