= Alibi Network =

French resistance intelligence network

- Réseau Alibi
- Formation: July 1, 1940
- Founder: Georges Charaudeau
- Dissolved: 1944
- Type: Intelligence network
- Location: France
- Key people: Georges Charaudeau, François de La Rocque
- Affiliations: British Secret Intelligence Service (MI6)

The Alibi Network (1940–1944) was a French resistance intelligence network created by Georges Charaudeau during the Second World War.

Active throughout France from July 1940 until the Liberation of France, the Alibi Network consisted of approximately 450 agents organized into about twenty sub-networks and groups. The network transmitted intelligence to the British Secret Intelligence Service (MI6) via around fifteen clandestine radio transmitters. Despite its scale and effectiveness, Alibi suffered relatively few casualties, with fifteen deaths recorded over its four-year existence (and twenty killed or missing in the Maurice sub-network).

== History ==
Georges Charaudeau (1908–1990), a right-wing Christian Democrat, had connections with French intelligence services since 1936. During the Battle of France in June 1940, Charaudeau, intending to flee to England via Spain, was persuaded by the head of British intelligence to remain and engage in espionage. To cover his activities, Charaudeau established a couture house in Madrid, and the Alibi Network was born on July 1, 1940. He returned clandestinely to France in August 1940 to organize a large intelligence network, aided by a diplomat from the United States Embassy in Vichy, who provided support for transporting documents, funds, and equipment.

In October 1941, the network suffered its first losses. The Phill sub-network, established in October 1940, was decimated. Seven members were arrested between October 31 and November 1, 1941, by Henri Lafont and collaborators of the French Gestapo on Rue Lauriston. They were interrogated at the Abwehr headquarters near the Bois de Boulogne and later at the Sicherheitspolizei (SiPo) offices. On March 20, 1942, five of the arrested were sentenced to death by the German military administration in occupied France and executed at Fort Mont-Valérien on March 21, 1942.

The executed members included:

- Jacques Kellner, an aeronautics industrialist
- Georges Paulin, an automotive designer and aerodynamicist
- Robert Stéphane Étienne, an aeronautical engineer
- Fernand Eugène Fenzi, director of the Paris School of Architecture
- Roger Léopold Alfred Raven, an automotive prototype worker

Two others received five-year sentences and were deported:

- Aileen Mary Sleator, interned in Anrath and Jawor, returned on June 1
- Marius Antonin Roubille, a SNCF controller, who was killed in Mauthausen concentration camp in May 1945

The Phill sub-network organized the first bombing of the Renault factories in March 1942 and provided MI6 with intelligence on the development of the Messerschmitt Me 262. It took 27 years for Georges Paulin to be awarded the Resistance Medal by France. However, a request for his posthumous admission to the Legion of Honour in 2006 was declined. A plaque honoring the Phill network was unveiled on June 20, 2006, in Paris.

In May 1942, under German pressure, Charaudeau returned clandestinely to France to continue his work. Among Alibi's sub-networks was the Klan Network led by Colonel François de La Rocque gathered intelligence from numerous members of the French Social Party.

After November 1942, many members of the Vichy Army joined the network, strengthening its capabilities. In April 1944, Alibi integrated the Maurice Network, which had suffered significant losses.

== Achievements ==
- By early 1944, Alibi established maritime links to England via motorboats from the Île-Grande region.
- It obtained detailed plans of the Heinkel He 111 from a French test pilot.
- Intelligence on German military supply orders provided insights into troop movements.
- SNCF agents reported on the contents and destinations of German trains.
- Municipal officials supplied sample ration cards, enabling London to produce forgeries.
- Correspondence between Philippe Pétain and Adolf Hitler, and between Otto Abetz and Pierre Laval, was sent to London through the network.

== Key figures ==
- Dr. Guy Thomas
- Pierre Virlogeux (1903–1944), leader of the Mouvements Unis de la Résistance in Auvergne
- Jean Gourcy (1916–1995), proprietor of the "Moulin Bleu"
