= Pascal Arrighi =

French politician

Pascal Arrighi (16 June 1921 – 18 August 2004) was a French politician.

Arrighi was born in Vico, Corse-du-Sud. He represented the French Radical Party (from 1956 to 1958), the Union for the New Republic (from 1958 to 1962), and the National Front (from 1986 to 1988) in the French National Assembly. He joined the National Centre of Independents and Peasants in 1989.
