= Fleurines =

- Commune
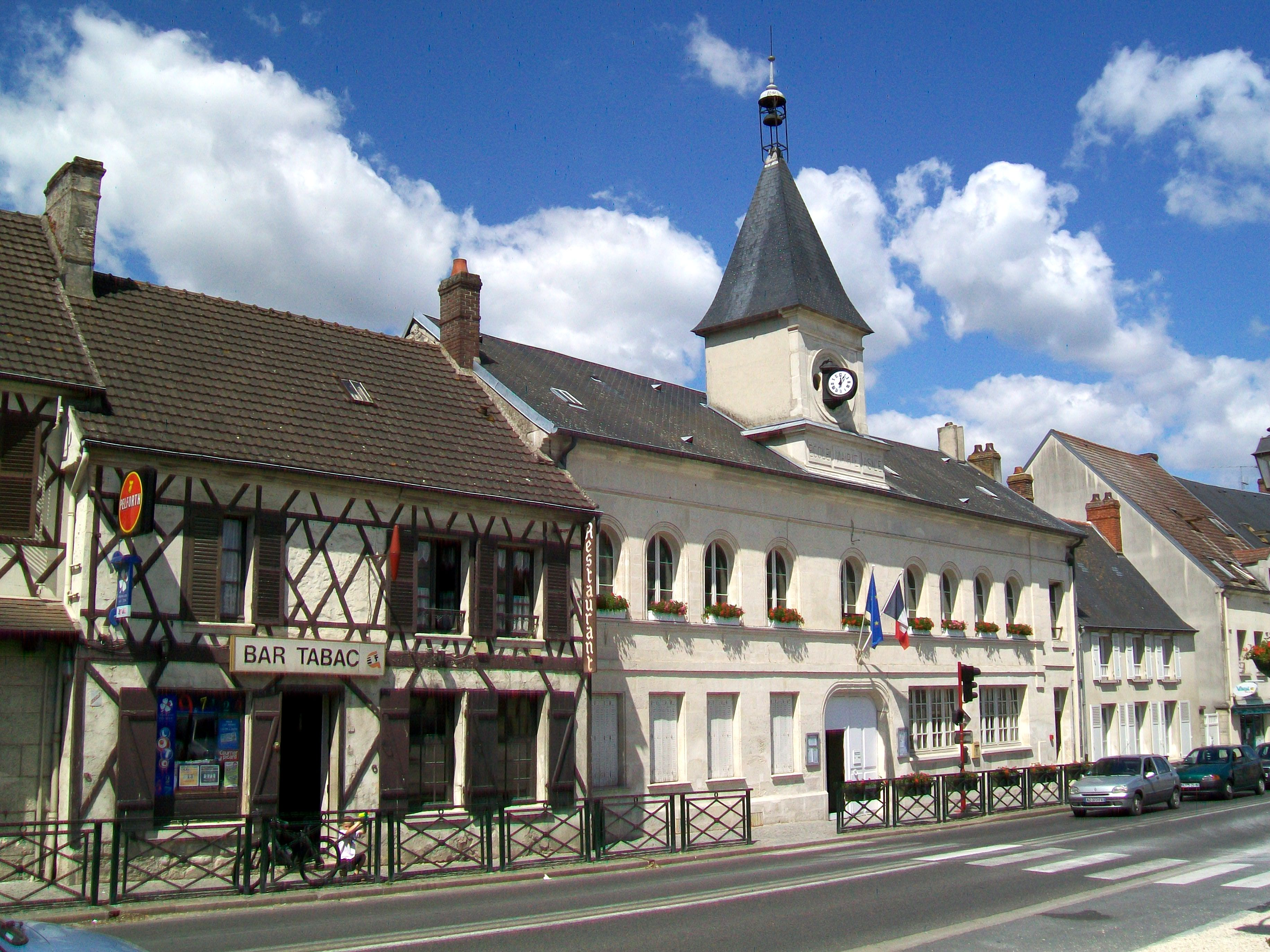
- The town hall in Fleurines

- Coat of arms
- Location of Fleurines
- Location within France Location within Hauts-de-France
- Coordinates: 49°15′47″N 2°35′11″E
- Country: France
- Region: Hauts-de-France
- Department: Oise
- Arrondissement: Senlis
- Canton: Senlis
- Intercommunality: Senlis Sud Oise

Government
  - Mayor (2026–32): Maya Estardier
- Area^{1}: 11.95 km^{2} (4.61 sq mi)
- Elevation: 113 m (371 ft)
- Highest elevation: 185 m (607 ft)
- Lowest elevation: 89 m (292 ft)
- Population (2023): 1,910
  - Density: 160/km^{2} (414/sq mi)
- Time zone: UTC+01:00 (CET)
  - Summer (DST): UTC+02:00 (CEST)
- INSEE/Postal code: 60238 /60700
- ^{1} French Land Register data, which excludes lakes, ponds, glaciers > 1 km^{2} (0.386 sq mi or 247 acres) and river estuaries.

Fleurines (French pronunciation: [flœʁin]) is a commune in the Oise department in northern France.

== See also ==
- Communes of the Oise department
