= Maurice Duclos =

French resistance leader

Maurice Duclos (23 August 1906 - 23 February 1981), codename Saint-Jacques, was a French soldier, insurance broker, anti-communist militant activist, intelligence agent and founder of the first French resistance network of WWII, also called Saint-Jacques, and two others.

== Biography ==
=== Early career ===
He was born in Neuilly sur Seine. He studied at the Collège Sainte-Croix and then entered his father's business. After In 1926, Duclos joined the Colonial artillery and served for two years in Madagascar. In November 1928, he was released from active service with the rank of sergeant and became an insurance broker.

=== La Cagoule ===
In the 1930s, he became an active member of the Organisation secrète d'action révolutionnaire nationale known as La Cagoule, an extreme-right-wing terror group. Members were called Cagoulards. On 11 September 1937, bombs planted by Cagoulards destroyed the Confédération générale du patronat français and the Union des industries et métiers de la métallurgie in Paris, killing two gendarmes and injuring two other people. The bombings became known as the Étoile attacks because of their proximity to that Paris landmark. Duclos was imprisoned in February 1938 for three-and-a-half months in La Santé Prison for trafficking the explosives for the attacks from the ship Atalante.

=== World War II ===
He was called up on 22 August 1939. Having been an artillery lieutenant in the army reserve, he was made a lieutenant, fourth battery, second group of the 10e régiment d'artillerie coloniale (10th Colonial Artillery Regiment). From May to June 1940, he fought with his unit in the Norwegian campaign. Detached as a liaison officer to the 13e demi-brigade de Légion étrangère, he distinguished himself in the fighting around Narvik, was promoted to honorary corporal of the Foreign Legion and received the Norwegian War Cross with sword. His unit returned to Brittany on 15 June 1940 and was encircled but he escaped from Plénée-Jugon on 17 June.

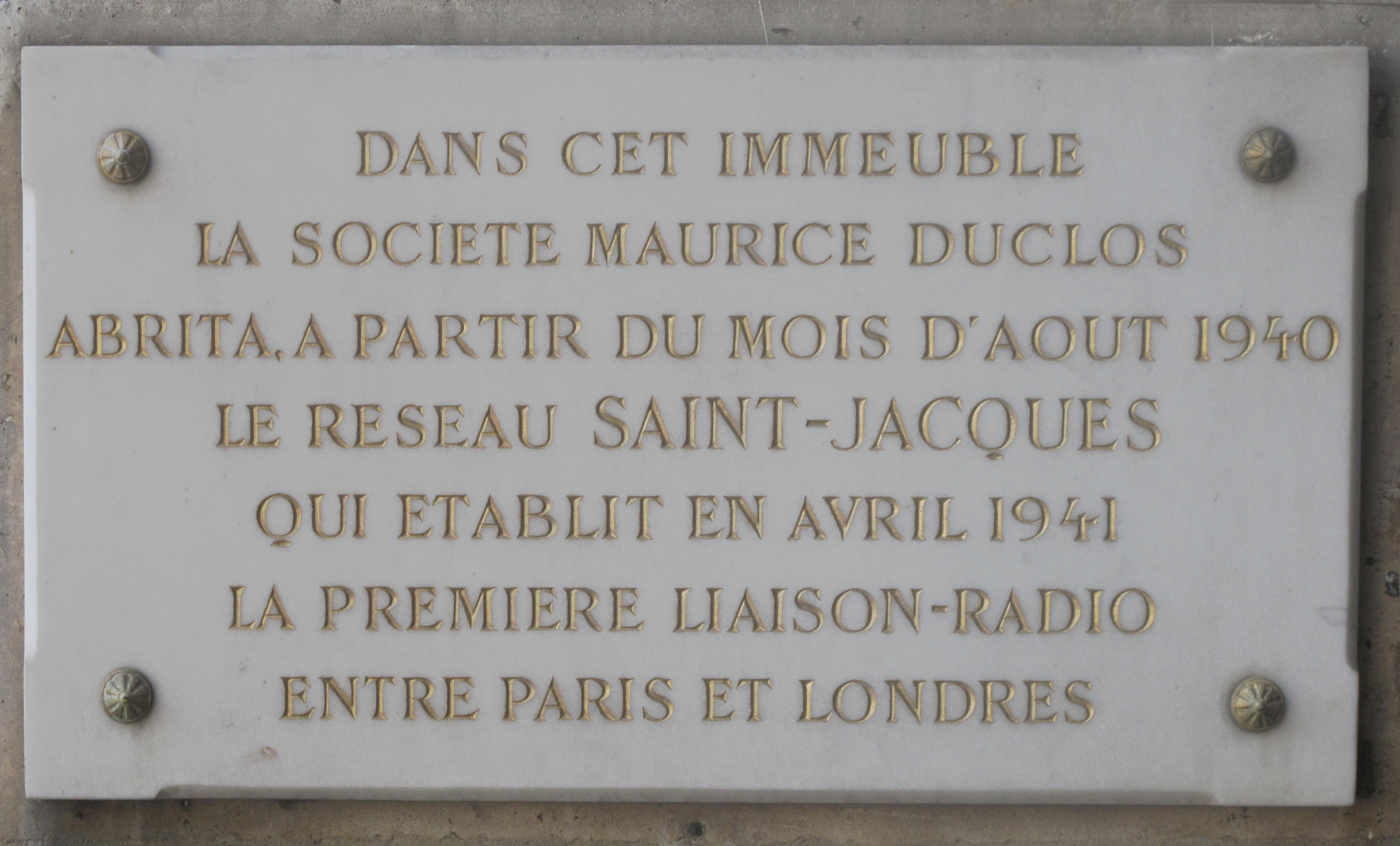
Plaque commemorating the Saint-Jacques resistamce network at the Hôtel Delpech de Chaunot, Paris

=== The BCRA ===
On 21 June, Duclos and some comrades reached England via Jersey on a fishing boat. France capitulated to Nazi Germany the following day under Philippe Pétain. On 1 July 1940, he joined Charles de Gaulle's Free France in London, under the orders of André Dewavrin (codename "Colonel Passy"), and was assigned to the intelligence service which became the Bureau Central de Renseignements et d'Action (BCRA), an organisation initially with military and political roles. It was Duclos who suggested Paris Métro names for codenames - his choice was "Saint-Jacques".

Having landed on the beach at Saint-Aubin-sur-Mer, Calvados on 4 August to assess the Nazi military potential for Adolf Hitler's planned invasion of England, he went to Paris, where he created the Saint-Jacques network based at his premises at the Place Vendôme, before laying the foundations of the Paris Job network and then helping to found the Confrérie Notre-Dame network with Gilbert Renault (codename "Rémy"). The Saint-Jacques network - part of the BCRA and operational from August 1940 - was the first French intelligence network of the war. On 18 August, he met fellow former Cagoulard, journalist Gabriel Jeantet, who became the propaganda chief of the Vichy régime. Jeantet introduced him to a number of Vichy colleagues in their new roles; despite the fact that Duclos had sided with de Gaulle, Jeantet maintained it was possible to be both anti-German and close to Pétain. Duclos crossed between the two wartime zones in France making contacts, especially in the fr:Compagnie parisienne de distribution d'électricité and the railways. Through Perpignan, he entered Spain in November before returning to London on 24 December.

On the night of 13–14 February 1941, he parachuted into the Dordogne from a bomber with his radio operator, John Gérard Mulleman. Landing in a wooded area, he broke his right leg and sprained the other. Unable to find Mulleman, he made makeshift splints and made it to a farm. The farmer called a doctor and the doctor reported him to the police. The doctor's view was that de Gaulle was surrounded by "communists and Jews, enriching themselves off the backs of the English." Duclos was arrested and taken to the hospital in Périgueux. On hearing this, Pierre Foucaud - another fellow former Cagoulard working under de Gaulle - contacted Jeantet in Paris; this "old boys' network" resulted in Duclos being dismissed from hospital and custody on 13 March. He managed to reach the demarcation line at Orthez. He crossed into the occupied zone with the help of an intermediary of Renault and continued walking across fields during the night, all the time on crutches. In Paris, by April 1941, the Saint-Jacques network established the first radio link between Paris (from the Place Vendôme premises) and Free France in London. However, Duclos suspected Mulleman - who was settled in Paris on his arrival - of being a collaborator as he'd claimed to have been captured with his radio set and detained for only three weeks after the parachute drop before being released. He used Renault's operator to transmit messages instead. From Mulleman's information, Duclos' older sister, Anne-Marie Lefèvre, was arrested in August (along with her husband and two children) and sentenced to death, before being pardoned. The network was gradually dismantled through September, also through information provided by another collaborator, André Folmer; captured male resisters were shot at Fort Mont-Valérien by the Wehrmacht and female resisters deported (they could not be executed in France by firing squad under French law).

=== Head of the Action Department ===
After flying to England on 1 March 1942, Dewavrin made Duclos head of the “Action, Studies and Coordination of Sabotage” section of the BCRA. Promoted to captain on 26 May and squadron leader the following month, he carried out several sabotage missions in France including "Armada I", "Armada II" and the destruction of the Saône dams, ultimately planning the destruction of major infrastructure and communications, specifically Plan Vert (railway communications), Plan Tortue (to delay Nazi armoured divisions on roads) and Plan Violet (neutralising enemy phone lines) in preparation for the Allied landings in Normandy. Duclos paralysed key railways and the transformers at Le Creusot and high-voltage power lines were destroyed. Later, he joined field marshal Bernard Montgomery's special forces in North Africa, fought in Normandy, Paris, Belgium and the Netherlands. Before the Allies entered Germany, he created and commanded a French commando unit - A.220 - which operated behind enemy lines. On 27 May 1943, at the Free French officer cadet school at Bewdley, de Gaulle awarded Duclos and Dewavrin the Croix de la Libération.

=== Post-war and La Cagoule trial ===
Demobilised on 30 July 1945, he joined major companies, including L'Oréal, and settled in Argentina, where he became president of the section of the Association des Français libres and president of l'Union française des anciens combattants d'Argentine and of the comité des sociétés françaises.

In October 1948, while in Buenos Aires, he learnt by chance that a court case against La Cagoule was being held in France. He flew to Paris to appear voluntarily amongst the other defendants. He did not deny his previous actions, casting them as part of a fear of communism, an explanation repeated by Jeantet in the same trial. Duclos' wartime acts and his medals were mentioned - the Croix de Guerre, Médaille de la Résistance and the Military Cross from the UK - all of which he dismissed as "bagatelles". He, with eleven of forty-nine defendants present (all resistance veterans), was cleared. Some accused remained refugees in Francoist Spain after that administration's rejection of extradition requests. The majority remaining were sentenced to forced labour, deportation (La Cagoule founder Henri Martin who went on the run) or execution (Jean Filiol [in exile], three killers of interior minister Marx Dormoy (who directed the arrest of Duclos and 69 other Cagoulards in 1937) and three killers of Italian socialist brothers Carlo and Nello Rosselli (murdered as part of a deal for weapons supplied from Fascist Italy). Duclos was bitter afterwards, stating, "I do not want to know any more about this country. It's not mine any more."

He died on 23 February 1981 in Buenos Aires, where he was buried.

== Awards ==
- Officier de la Légion d'honneur
- Compagnon de la Libération par décret du 25 Mai 1943
- Croix de guerre 1939-1945 (4 citations)
- Croix du combattant volontaire 1939-1945)
- Médaille de la France libérée
- Médaille commémorative des services volontaires dans la France libre
- Military Cross (UK)
- Officer of the Order of the British Empire (military)
- Krigskorset med sverd (War Cross with sword [Norway])
