= Gilberte Champion =

French WWII resistance fighter (1913–2020)

Gilberte Louise Champion (née Gueunier) (17 April 1913 Paris – 18 November 2020 Sucy-en-Brie) was a Postes, télégraphes et téléphones (PTT) worker and a radio operator in the French resistance during World War II for the Jade-Fitzroy network under the auspices of the British Secret Intelligence Service (SIS). She was captured, tortured and later transported to Ravensbrück and Mauthausen concentration camps.

== Biography ==
She was born in the 14th arrondissement of Paris. She and her husband, Pierre, were PTT employees from before the war. Her work was specifically in telecommunications at the Boulevard de Vaugirard. Through her family connexions, she was an early recruit to the Jade-Fitzroy network, started by royalist right-winger Claude Lamirault after he sought help from the SIS in London. The Champion family had already taken part in leafleting against the Vichy government. Champion was the aunt of Lamirault's wife, Denise. Her husband became a deputy of Pierre Hentic, Lamirault's communist co-leader and former Chasseurs Alpins colleague, who took charge of all network air and sea operations in 1943. She went to England for training as an agent and a radio operator. At 20:20 hours on 15 January 1943, she left RAF Tangmere in a Halifax bomber which was on a multi-drop mission. At 23:16, Champion, with her packaged radio set, and another agent, Pierre Gambs, parachuted at the 'Buttercup' drop over Servas. According to arrangements, she was received by a group of resisters which included her husband and commenced her radio operator role. While she worked for Jade-Fitzroy, her eldest son was placed in a British boarding school.

Concerned at the operational instructions given to her, she told Lamirault to pay more attention to basic security procedures; she wondered if she might be better off working for the Jade-Amicol network, another SIS-led group, as she'd spoken to one of its leaders, Philip Keun. She was arrested by the Gestapo in Lyon on 11 April 1943 - the day after her final talk with Keun - along with fellow resister and radio operator Paul Fuchs, and was incarcerated in Montluc prison (her husband, who had been unaware of her arrest, was evacuated to England on 26 April). She was interrogated by Klaus Barbie, the local Gestapo chief and so-called "Butcher of Lyon". Initially accused of being intimate with Fuchs, she was then kept apart from him, although she managed to pass a message to him suggesting a joint approach to responses during interrogation. She survived without revealing her real identity or details of other Jade-Fitzroy agents, despite being tortured and living in terror under Barbie; she recalled his verbal abuse of a Jewish prisoner in the cell next to her, asking if he would talk, the prisoner begging for his life before Barbie shot him dead. She got confirmation the following day when the person bringing her soup said, "It's all tidied up. It's finished." She was moved to Fresnes Prison temporarily; there, a young cellmate who was released succeeded in getting out a note Champion had written on a handkerchief secreted in her overcoat. It reached Wilfred Dunderdale of the SIS, who read about the details of her arrest, communication compromises in Jade-Fitzroy, the state of Gestapo staff and saving other agents; he changed his plans accordingly. She was transferred to Ravensbrück concentration camp (for women) in north-east Germany on 15 November 1943. She remained there until being moved to Mauthausen on 7 March 1945. While interned, she faced the extra difficulty of rejection by her compatriots: there was no solidarity between French resistance groups, which kept within their political affiliations - e.g. communists, Gaullists - and which regarded French people working under the SIS as outsiders who should instead ask for help from British prisoners. She was liberated from Mauthausen on 24 April 1945 and repatriated on 11–12 June at Mulhouse by the Red Cross.

She died in Sucy-en-Brie aged 107.

== Honours and legacy ==
- Croix de guerre 1939–1945 with palms
- Médaille de la Résistance française
- King's Medal for Courage in the Cause of Freedom
- Grand Croix de l'Ordre national de la Légion d'honneur

She was made Commander of the National Order of the Legion of Honour on 9 February 1967, then promoted to Grand Officer on 13 July 1980, finally to the highest rank of Grand Cross on 14 July 2008.

In 2006, she donated documents relating to Jade-Fitzroy and her time in the resistance to Fonds Amicale des anciens des services spéciaux de la Défense nationale.
