= Jade-Fitzroy network =

World War II French Resistance network

The Jade-Fitzroy network was a World War II French Resistance network created by Claude Lamirault, supported by Pierre Hentic, under the overall control of the British Secret Intelligence Service (SIS). It operated from 1941 to 1944.

== History ==
Lamirault, a young Catholic activist, was unhappy at France's surrender to Nazi Germany. Impatient to contribute to the war effort, he left France for England via French North Africa and Gibraltar with friends Eugène Pérot and Pierre Giran. In London, they were turned away by de Gaulle's office but met resister Henri Honoré d'Estienne d'Orves and were introduced to SIS staff. Following cypher and parachute training, Lamirault was dropped into Bracieux in January 1941 to begin creating an intelligence network. He was joined by Pierre Hentic, a left-wing activist with whom he'd trained as an alpine soldier. Lamirault's wife Denise, some of her family and other former alpine colleagues joined him. The name Jade-Fitzroy came from the mineral jade and Lamirault's membership of the Camelots du Roi (a right-wing youth group within Action Française), the prefix Fitz meaning 'son of'.

Initially, Jade-Fitzroy's centre of operations was roughly north of the demarcation line. Afterwards, it was fused with another SIS-led network called Jade-Amicol, created by Claude Arnould and Philip Keun, working largely south of the line. Hentic, also trained by the SIS, organised air and sea operations between Brest and England for both networks, for which he was given a substantial budget. To transfer agents and intelligence materials, Westland Lysanders were often used or boats were rowed ashore from Royal Navy craft. This was during the complete takeover of France by the Nazis in November 1942; the SIS wanted to pool resources for efficiency, hoping to effect better cross-checking of information. Being autonomous with his own team of operatives, Hentic was imposed upon as an interlocutor between the networks, fielding requests from either Lamirault or Keun but strict with principles - no agents were arrested during his activities. Arnould and Keun were suspicious of Lamirault: his familiars related his failure to maintain basic security protocols, his casualness, lifestyle and drawing attention to himself e.g. by wearing a monocle and smoking British cigarettes. Following security lapses (gaining a reproach from the SIS) and the arrest by the Gestapo of radio operators Paul Fuchs (an army colleague) and Gilberte Champion (his wife's aunt), the networks separated in June 1943.

At the beginning of 1943, the centre of the Resistance had effectively moved to Lyon, better for welcoming new groups. Lamirault retained local connexions having been garrisoned in Annecy; its proximity to Swiss industry and MI6 operations there was useful. As well as personnel transports, the network had reported on Nazi movements and transmissions, aircraft production, port activity and coastal defences. However, there followed the arrests of Lamirault (December 1943), his successor as network leader, Paul Fortier (January 1944), and Hentic (February 1944), all of whom were eventually transported to Dachau. Denise Lamirault took over until her arrest (April 1944). These were destabilising blows. Alarmed, the SIS severed further relations with Jade-Fitzroy agents.

From July 1944, with the progress of the Allied invasions of France, what remained of Jade-Fitzroy was named 'Panta' and absorbed by the Bureau central de renseignements et d'action (the predecessor of the SDECE, the current French intelligence service). Lamirault, Fortier and Hentic were freed from Dachau in 1945. On 27 May, Lamirault crashed his car and died in Orléans; his wife and son survived. Hentic - given the rank of commander by the British and captain by the French - rejoined the French Army, turning down further approaches by the British. He died in 2004.
