= Jade-Amicol network =

French resistance network

The Jade-Amicol network (French: Réseau Jade-Amicol) was a French resistance network led by Claude Arnould and British officer Captain Philip Keun, created under the auspices of the British Secret Intelligence Service, commonly known as MI6. It operated from 1940 to 1944.

== History ==
After serving in World War I, in the inter-war period, Arnould had been a military attaché to Denmark and had been sent on various missions in Europe - he may have been a member of the Deuxième Bureau. From the occupation by Nazi Germany and the time of the armistice of 22 June 1940, he continued in his official service role and was part of the fr:Bureau des menées antinationales. In October 1940, he met Father Antoine Dieuzayde at the Foyer Henri Bazire in Bordeaux. Dieuzayde was the Basque chaplain of the fr:Association catholique de la jeunesse française who with Raymond Dupouy at the camp de Bernard Rollo in Barèges had a previous history of helping refugees from Francoist Spain. Dieuzayde's personal links with key staff in the employ of economic and railway transport concerns proved invaluable. Thus, Arnould had the support of Jesuits in the south-west of France, who thereafter provided safe lodging and connexions. With this foundation, he became the co-leader of what became MI6's 'Jade-Amicol' resistance network whose actions were centred in south-west France; the name came from the semi-precious stone jade, the codename 'Amiral' of the other co-leader, British-born Philip Keun - and the nom-de-guerre of Arnould, COL, who was known as Colonel Ollivier amongst other codenames. Keun had French ancestry and had volunteered for the French Army. He had been captured by the Nazis but escaped from the prisoner-of-war camp at Cambrai in 1941. The definitive structure of the network was finalised at the end of 1941. The communications with London and associated logistics went through Keun. The network was directly associated with MI6 because Arnould had not wanted to join with General Charles de Gaulle, leader of the Free French forces based in London. It was under the overall command of Major-General Sir Stewart Graham Menzies, the head of MI6, assisted by Commander Wilfred Dunderdale, a friend of Keun's father. While Arnould was in contact with the special services in the armistice army from the end of 1940, Keun had managed to infiltrate the Vichy Marine Intelligence Service. Initially, Jade-Amicol was linked with the Jade-Fitzroy network created by Claude Lamirault, a young Catholic activist. The networks split after a series of arrests between 1942 and 1943.

=== Recruitment ===
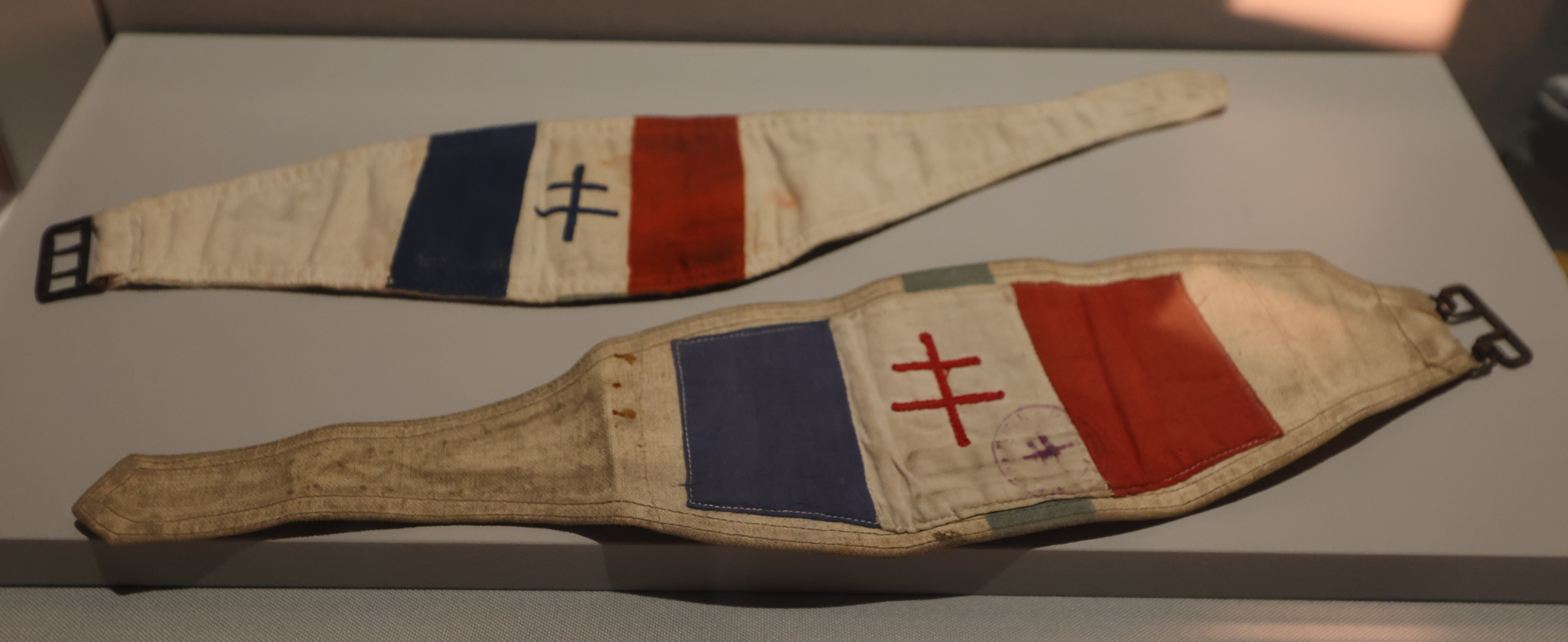
armbands worn by members of the Jade-Amicol network

Recruits were largely from amongst Catholic and ecclesiastical circles in the Bordeaux region. Mother Superior Jean of the convent hospital of Saint-Joseph, on fr:Rue de la Santé in Paris, granted the usage of a chapel in the convent building that became the Paris headquarters for the network from 1942, which then set up different branches in French provinces. The convent dispensary was used for the first civilian fugitives of the Nazi occupation as well as Allied staff. There were tens of air missions for communications between Paris and London and within France, none of which were discovered by the Nazis. Arnould involved a number of staff at the Jesuit Lycée Saint-Joseph-de-Tivoli in Bordeaux. The chaplain, Father de Gorostarzu - also Basque - was one of those involved in recruiting agents. He was attached to the Interallied General Staff from 1 October 1940 to 15 September 1944 and was later commended by Field Marshal Bernard Montgomery. He involved final-year students in the resistance campaign. Hélie Denoix de Saint-Marc, a teenage student who de Gorostarzu told he knew was breaking the rules by crossing between the zone libre and the zone occupée, was asked by him to help Arnould. An appointment was made to take him across the lines. Further tasks were requested by Arnould, including bringing through various unidentified people and carrying mail and parcels. The journeys became much longer, going as far as the border with Spain. Only after the war did he understand that many of his actions were to do with weapons. Father Bégot, the prefect of studies and teacher of philosophy at the school, also recruited agents. He contacted Josette Lassalle, a resistance member from Bordeaux, and invited her to meet Arnould, who then recruited her for the network. She met regularly with de Gorostarzu while travelling on the train. In a similar fashion, the network operated up to 1400 agents by 1944.

=== Casualties ===
Father Louis de Jabrun, a former officer during World War I who was living at the “Jésuitière” residence on rue Poquelin-Molière in Bordeaux, had joined the resistance after rejoining the French army before the armistice. He operated a prisoner-escape network and from late 1940 transmitted information through the Jade-Amicol network. He was arrested in June 1943 and after deportation to Germany died of a fever in December that year in Buchenwald concentration camp. In December 1943, Arnould was wounded by two bullets during a Nazi ambush, but escaped into hiding, recovering at the clinic at fr:Rue Violet. On hearing this, Keun, who'd made air- and sea-based trips back to England, insisted upon returning to France to bolster operations. He damaged spinal vertebrae in his parachute-landing but despite a warning of paralysis from a doctor continued acting as a courier to agents. Keun was captured the following year, this time by the Gestapo on 29 June 1944, and deported to Germany. He was hanged at Buchenwald on 9 September 1944. In total, the network suffered 34 losses, 8 killed in France and 26 through deportations. It has been suggested that this relatively small number was due to successful compartmentalisation within the network.

=== Post-war ===
After the liberation of France, de Gorostarzu and Arnould worked for the Vatican. Arnould was sent on numerous worldwide diplomatic missions. De Gorostarzu worked for the Superior General of the Society of Jesus, Jean-Baptiste Janssens, in particular with Cardinal Augustin Bea on improving Catholic-Jewish relations. There remained long-lasting controversy concerning links between the network and double-agents, its perceived support for certain clergy and politicians associated ideologically with the Vichy government and funding for the network through the Banque de l'Indochine.
