= Pierre Hentic =

French intelligence agent

Pierre Yves Marie Hentic (2 April 1917 - 12 March 2004). codename "Maho", was a French intelligence agent, Resistance organiser, and army officer. He ran the air and sea operations of the Jade-Fitzroy and Jade-Amicol networks for the British Secret Intelligence Service (SIS) in France during World War II.

== Early life ==
Hentic was born at 110 rue Orfila, 20th arrondissement of Paris to a Breton mother and an unknown father. He was educated at Saint-Nicolas d'Issy-les-Moulineaux. About the age of ten, he rejoined his mother, who worked for the Costa de Beauregard family. Placed with a foster family, he gained his primary school certificate and joined L'École de Pupilles de la Marine in Brest, a military-linked state school for orphans. He stayed on to train as an officer but in the changing 1930s was involved in left-wing agitation for which he was confined to crew quarters. Released to civilian life, he worked as a laboratory technician at Établissements Darrasses, a pharmaceutical company, and educated himself privately while campaigning for the young communists. His mother died in 1935. He was dissuaded from joining the Republicans in the Spanish Civil War by a Soviet friend. In 1936, he was conscripted into the 27th Chasseurs Alpins [Alpine hunters], where he met future resistance colleague Claude Lamirault. He returned to his laboratory work but was recalled to the Chasseurs Alpins on the outbreak of World War II.

== World War II ==
Posted to the Franco-Italian border as a scout skier and then Norway, his unit suffered under Luftwaffe attacks in the north and he returned to France via Scotland. After the invasion of France, he went to Bordeaux and Marseille to continue the fight but when the armistice was signed he returned to his job at Établissements Darrasses. Keen to resist the Nazis, he learned about escapees to England on fishing boats from a cousin in Bretagne who laid plans before having to be sheltered by him when German customs found out. In February 1941, Lamirault's wife, Denise, told him of her husband's SIS mission and that he wanted Hentic by his side. He agreed.

Lamirault's network was Jade-Fitzroy. After almost a year of activity, Hentic was arrested twice at the beginning of 1942; the first time was with Lamirault's brother-in-law, Bernard Rousselot, with whom he was to deliver a courier before being stopped and questioned ineffectively by German sentries; the second time he was driving alone, having earlier picked up Lamirault, but was stopped by two gendarmes who found a pair of Colt revolvers and British quality products in his suitcase, accusing him of burglary. He admitted being in the resistance, sensed their complicity and fled at speed. On the night of the 28 May, following Lamirault's suggestion to find horses to help extract a bogged-in British Lysanders that had just arrived, he was arrested at gunpoint by gendarmes. His attempted escape met with a rifle bullet past his ear. After imprisonment at Châteauroux he was transferred to Périgueux then Mauzac. At a Nazi tribunal, he was sentenced to twelve years' hard labour. He was released from prison on 16 November after the commencement of Operation Torch affected the outlook of military justice officers in the Vichy régime. Adolf Hitler dissolved the Armistice army ten days later.

On the night of 23 February 1943, notable for lapses by Lamirault, Hentic flew to England for three months' training in spotting, mark-up and encryption in addition to his parachute and radio transmitter training. He was dropped back into France on 21 May. He'd been given sole authority over the organisation of air and sea operations for Jade-Fitzroy and another SIS-led network, Jade-Amicol. As well as autonomy, he received a large budget and control of his own team of agents. Because of mistrust and personality differences between the leaders of Jade-Amicol on one side (Claude Arnould and particularly Philip Keun) and Lamirault on the other, Hentic was effectively a go-between, deciding when and how to satisfy each leader as he saw fit. His management was efficient: none of his agents was arrested during his own operations. Large documents were microfilmed and others sent as paper. Safe flights carrying intelligence, agents and rescued air-crew - typically using Lysanders and Hudsons - were completed on moonless nights, otherwise boats were rowed to small Royal Navy craft offshore. Between 27 May and 11 November, he made ten landings and over 20 parachute drops. Many evacuated Americans mentioned Hentic by his codename [noted as "Mao"] and lauded his efforts. Thereafter, "escape and evasion" training included details of Maho and other resisters.

Arrests from the end of 1943 into 1944 permanently damaged the Jade-Fitzroy network. Hentic was arrested in February 1944 and interrogated over four days at "le repaire de Masuy" ["Masuy's bathtub"], 101 Avenue Henri-Martin; Masuy - real name Georges Delfanne - was a Belgian Nazi-collaborator known for brutal torture. He was moved to Fresnes Prison with regular visits to Rue des Saussaies for interrogation by the Gestapo. A red sign on his cell labelled him as "dangerous". He was transferred to Royallieu-Compiègne internment camp on 4 June, was isolated and then put on the train to Dachau on 18 JUne, where Lamirault was also sent. He was used as a construction labourer.

== Post-War life ==
After the liberation of Dachau in May 1945, he rejoined the French army. He was the rank of commander in the British forces and captain in the French. In 1946, Hentic married Staten Island-resident Captain Dorothy A. Smith of the US Women's Army Corps, who had hand-written the reports during interviews of evacuated American airmen during the war and who later sought out the resisters to reimburse them. Also in 1946, Hentic was posted to Indochina; he learned that the British wanted to reward him for his service and gain information about French military deployment there, but his loyalty was wholly to France. He was sent on various missions as an airborne commando. Six years later, he was posted to Algeria where he trained paratroopers and reservists. He returned to France for medical reasons in 1962, retiring with the rank of colonel. He died in 2004.

== Honours ==
- Commandeur de la Légion d'honneur
- Croix du combattant volontaire
- Médaille de la Résistance française
- Croix de guerre 1939-1945 with 13 citations.
- Croix de guerre des théâtres d'opérations extérieures
- Croix de la Valeur militaire
- Order of the British Empire
- Medal of Freedom with palm
