= Antoine Dieuzayde =

French catholic priest (1877–1958)

The Reverend Antoine Dieuzayde SJ
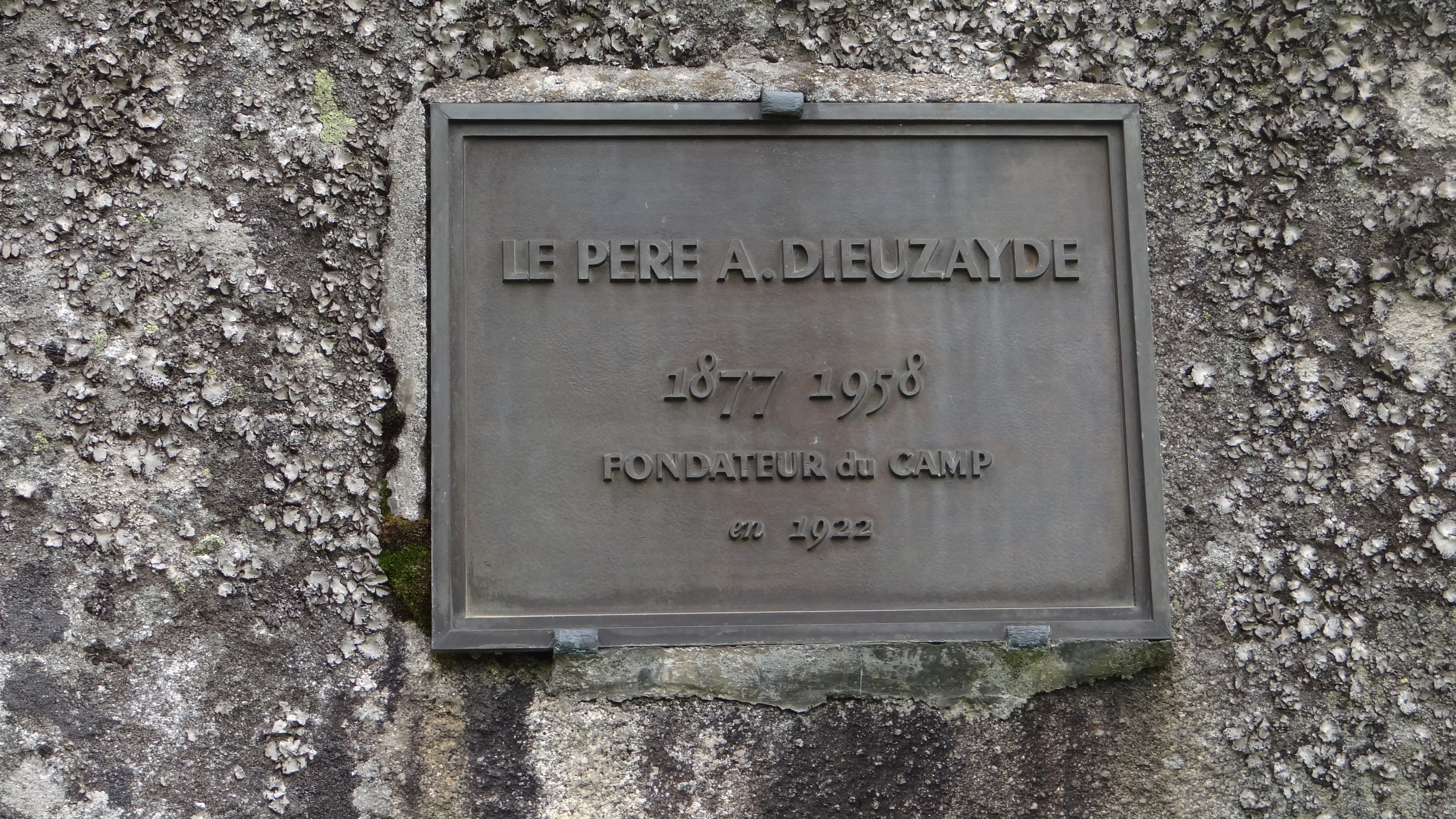
- A plaque commemorating Dieuzayde
- Born: 13 June 1877; Toulouse, France
- Died: 13 July 1958 (aged 81); Bordeaux, France

Personal life
- Known for: Founding Catholic youth education camp and centre; involvement in French Resistance, particularly the Jade-Amicol network
- Honors: Camp Bernard Rollot decorated with Croix de Guerre

Religious life
- Religion: Roman Catholic
- Order: Society of Jesus
- Profession: Catholic Jesuit priest

Antoine Dieuzayde (13 June 1877 – 13 July 1958) was a French Basque Catholic priest and member of the French Resistance during World War II. He founded a camp for youth education in the Pyrenees and a Catholic youth centre in Bordeaux. He organised the reception of refugees from the Spanish Civil War and used his connexions to help resistance groups, particularly the Jade-Amicol network whose operations were centred in south-west France.

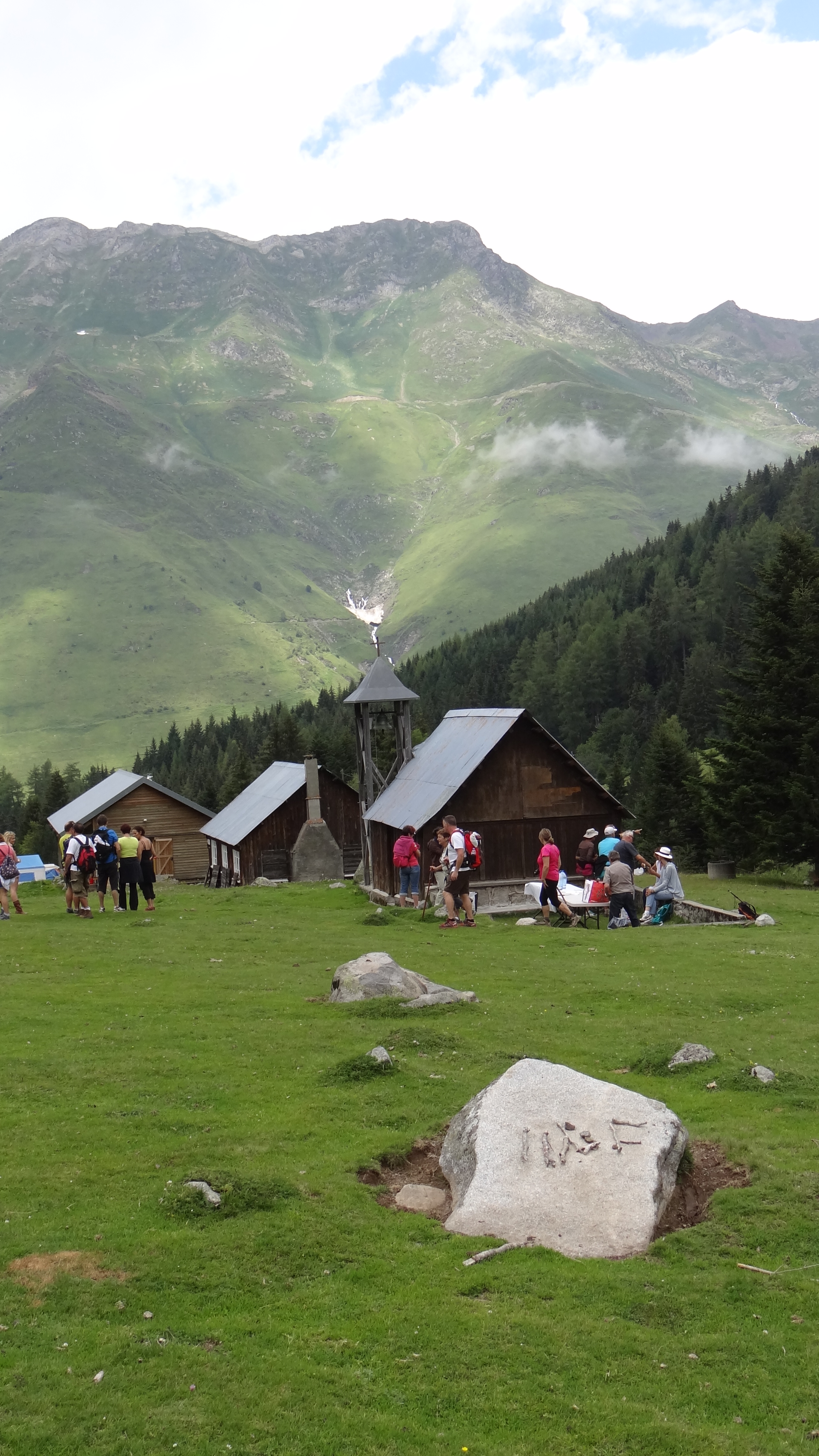
The camp Bernard Rollo in the French Pyrenees, founded by Fr.Dieuzayde.

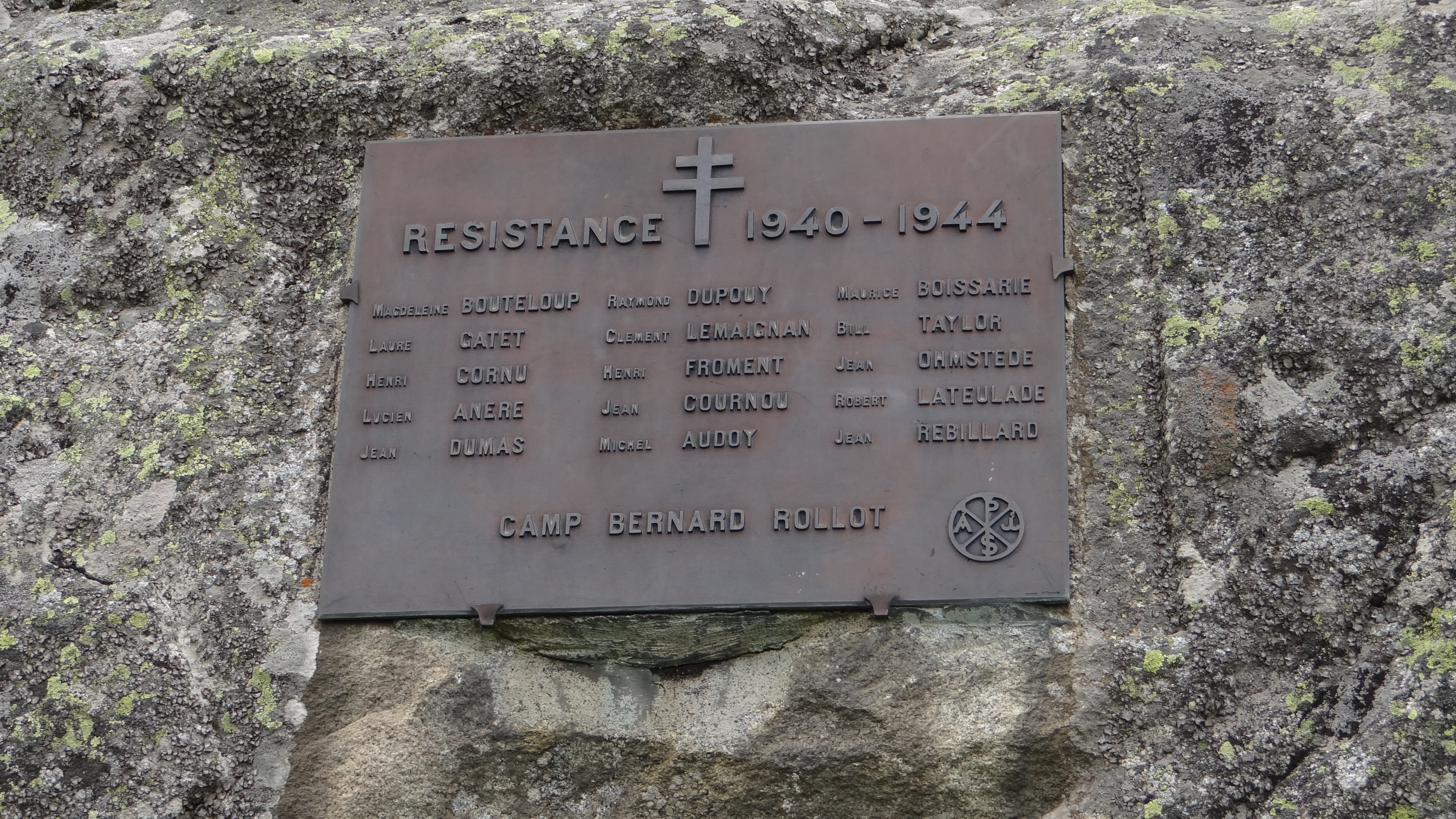
A plaque at the youth camp commemorating French resistance victims of Nazi occupation who attended the youth camp.

== Biography ==
He was born on 13 June 1877 in Toulouse (France). He began studying law in Toulouse, then entered a novitiate of the Society of Jesus in Rodez in 1899. He was assigned to Bordeaux. Dieuzayde was deeply evangelical, fervently practising Ignatian spirituality which involves periods of solitude and meditation, which he encouraged in certain others. He became chaplain of the fr:Association catholique de la jeunesse française (Catholic Association of French Youth) from 1914. His views were close to Le Sillon, the French social politico-religious movement created in 1894 to counter marxism. In 1919, he set up a Social Secretariat in Bordeaux, to "make known the social doctrine of the Catholic Church as a documentation and propaganda centre". In particular, the Secretariat encouraged the formation of agricultural unions, unions of employees and discussions about government welfare or the minimum wage.

=== The camp de Bernard Rollo in the Pyrenees ===
After first visiting the site in 1918, Fr. Dieuzayde founded a camp in Barèges at an altitude of 1,600 metres in 1922. He named it camp Bernard Rollo after one of the boys in his ministry who was killed at the front on 24 July 1918 near the end of World War I. His budget was 1180 francs, including 500 francs from the city of Bordeaux. Young campers, typically from Bordeaux and Montpellier, paid 8 francs for their stay, which included various outdoor activities and treks across the Spanish border. The camp itself was awarded the Croix de Guerre. In 1923, he became chaplain-general of scouting. The camp became an important place for meetings and discussions on Christianity, faith and commitment in the modern world until Dieuzayde's death, hosting leading academics such as the philosopher fr:Paul Vignaux, and historians Henri-Irénée Marrou and André Mandouze.

=== The foyer Henri Bazire ===
In 1927, he founded the foyer Henri Bazire in rue du Pont-de-la-Mousque, Bordeaux. With its chapel and meeting rooms, it became a rallying point for young Catholics from Bordeaux. Dieuzayde became known affectionately amongst the youth as "le vieux zèbre" ("the old zebra"). As at the camp Bernard Rollo, he invited many speakers to Semaines sociales such as Professors André Garrigou-Lagrange and Jean Brethe de la Gressaye, political economists from the University of Bordeaux. Later, during and after the Spanish Civil War, he helped refugees who had escaped from Spain and some who went into hiding. In this he was helped by insurance agent Raymond Dupouy, president of the fr:Association Catholique de la Jeunesse Française in Bordeaux. Dieuzayde played an important role in the Catholic opposition to Action Française, a far-right-wing monarchist group which claimed to support Catholicism.

=== Involvement in the French Resistance ===
Fr. Dieuzayde and others who attended the camp Bernard Rollo and foyer Henri Bazire, whom he later designated as the Barégeois de Bordeaux, took part in various resistance movements against Nazi occupation in France. Dieuzayde joined the Jade-Amicol network; in 1940, he was visited at the foyer Henri Bazire by Claude Arnould, the co-leader of the network, and he offered his services along with fellow Jesuit, Fr. Gorostarzu. Fr. Dieuzayde's connexions in industry, infrastructure and the Society of Jesus were invaluable. In the winter of 1942–1943, he hid from the Nazis in the camp. No youth camp was held from 1943 to 1944. Resistance members of Dieuzayde's ministry who became victims of the Nazis included Laure Gatet, a biochemist in the Gaullist network Confrérie Notre-Dame who died of dysentery in Auschwitz-Birkenau in February 1943, and his former collaborator Dupouy, who was tortured and shot with 23 others in Grenoble in August 1944.

=== Post-war ===
In 1945, Fr. Dieuzayde relaunched a project he'd had for a Maison Familiale and the camps in the Pyrennees resumed. In 1947, the camp Bernard Rollo celebrated its 25th anniversary and Fr. Dieuzayde was awarded the Croix de Guerre. Construction of the Maison Familiale began in 1951, organised by the Swiss-born skier Walter Jeandel, and was completed the following year. On 8 March 1952, Fr.Dieuzayde had his first major health scare, suffering partial paralysis; he still made it to the camp in the summer. The completed Maison Familiale was named Chalet les Pics and the Association Bernard Rollo was founded on 4 July 1952. On 4 May 1957, Fr. Dieuzayde had a major relapse. He died on 13 July 1958 in Bordeaux.
