= Claude Arnould =

French soldier and intelligence agent

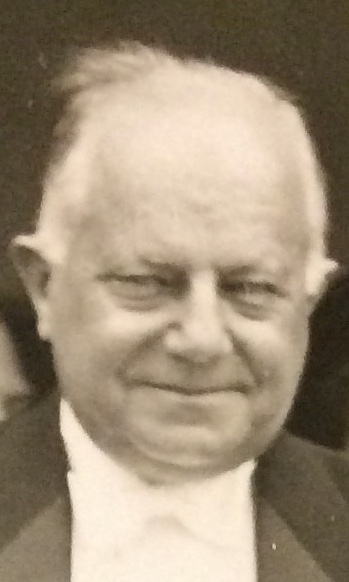
Claude Arnould

Claude Louis Marie Joseph Arnould (10 May 1899 – 22 December 1978), also known as Colonel Arnould, Colonel Ollivier and other cryptonyms, was a French officer, intelligence agent, resistance leader, businessman and diplomat. During World War II, he was the co-leader of the Jade-Amicol resistance network under the auspices of the British Secret Intelligence Service (SIS), commonly known as MI6.

== Biography ==
He was born in Merville, in northern France, to a strongly Catholic family previously associated with saddle-making in Lorraine. His father, Jean Arnould, owned a brick factory in Le Sart near Merville. During World War I he was sent to Clongowes Wood College in Ireland, run by the Society of Jesus. In November 1917, six months after his brother Joseph's death in the War, he signed up for the army for four years, joining the 1er régiment de tirailleurs mixte zouaves (a mixed infantry regiment) followed by the 19ème escadron du Train des équipages (a train equipment squadron). After the war, he asked for an external service assignment and in 1920, he became secretary to the military attaché of the French legation in Copenhagen, Pierre Pellissier de Féligonde, under Paul Claudel, who was ministre plénipotentiaire in Denmark, from where he was sent on a mission in Germany; he was possibly by then an agent of the Deuxième Bureau, the French secret service. On 17 February 1925, he married Louise Marie Céline Charlotte Petit. They had three daughters.

=== Expansion of contacts in the Catholic church and the French government ===
He engaged regularly in events organised by the Catholic church and met with Achille Liénart, the cardinal of Lille, and general Maxime Weygand, who visited his home in 1936. He took over the family brick-making business with Marie on 31 December 1936, also operating as a merchant; during 1937, he travelled to six different countries on behalf of the Deuxième Bureau under the cover of his business, the expenses possibly adding to his growing financial difficulties. He filed for bankruptcy in December 1937. Owing money to his employees and facing imprisonment, he gave portions of the business to them in lieu of funds. After a judicial investigation, he was sentenced to four months' imprisonment but no further action ensued. At the beginning of 1939, at the request of president of the council of ministers, Édouard Daladier, he went unofficially to the newly elected Pope Pius XII to ascertain his position concerning the increasingly difficult international situation; this role – effectively a promotion of influence within the Catholic church – was possibly facilitated by Liénart. Mobilised in the French Army in August 1939 in the postal control service, made a maréchal des logis (sergeant) in September then a brigadier in December, responsible for refuelling and the secretariat, he aimed to find his way to England in the ensuing débâcle, renewing his intelligence contacts in the process. After the Nazi occupation of France and the Armistice of 22 June 1940, he was unable to return home as it was in the northern zone interdite. On 12 August 1940, he applied to be sent on missions abroad or in an active army unit, citing his mastery of the English language and his two croix de guerre, one for each world war. He was demobilised as a brigadier-chef on 28 February 1941 and put forward by the Vichy military administration to expand the team of counter-espionage agents in the non-occupied zone, specifically in Toulouse, becoming part of the fr:Bureau des menées antinationales.

=== Co-leadership of the Jade-Amicol network ===
In October 1940, he had contacted Father Antoine Dieuzayde, the Basque chaplain of the fr:Association catholique de la jeunesse française. With Raymond Dupouy, Dieuzayde had helped refugees escaping from Francoist Spain at the camp de Bernard Rollo in Barèges. With such support from the Jesuits in the south-west of France, he had strong links and refuges. He became co-leader of MI6's 'Jade-Amicol resistance network' along with a British officer, captain Philip Keun. The networks' actions were centred in south-west France and operated between 1940 and 1944. The name came from the mineral jade and the codenames of the two leaders. Arnould had not wanted to join with General Charles de Gaulle, leader of the Free French forces based in London so the network had direct control from MI6 (In 1940, Claude Lamirault, leader of the Jade-Fitzroy network, had been turned away by de Gaulle's office in London but was accepted by MI6). He contacted the special services in the armistice army from the end of 1940. Keun escaped from a prisoner-of-war camp in Cambrai, in 1941; he had managed to infiltrate the Vichy Marine Intelligence Service. The structure of the Jade-Amicol network was set at the end of 1941. From this time until 1944, Arnould severed all contact with his family to ensure their safety. He recruited largely from amongst Catholic and ecclesiastical circles in the Bordeaux region. It was linked at the start with the Jade-Fitzroy network, but they split after arrests made between 1942 and 1943.

Arnould involved a number of staff at the Jesuit Lycée Saint-Joseph-de-Tivoli in Bordeaux. The chaplain, Father Bernard de Gorostarzu, included final-year students from the school amongst recruits. Amongst them was resistance member fr:Hélie Denoix de Saint-Marc, a teenage student who'd been crossing between the occupied and free zones and was recruited to assist Arnould. He described his character as "massive" with an encouraging, mysterious and complex character. Father Bégot, the prefect of studies and teacher of philosophy at the school, also recruited agents. Mother Superior Jean of the convent hospital of Saint-Joseph, on fr:Rue de la Santé in Paris, allowed the usage of the convent chapel as the Paris headquarters for the network from 1942, from which time further branches were set up in different French provinces. The convent dispensary received civilian fugitives of the Nazi occupation as well as Allied soldiers. There were tens of air communications between Paris and London as well as within France, none of which raised the suspicions of the Nazis. The network operated up to 1400 agents by 1944.

Arnoud was the victim of a Nazi ambush in December 1943 at the home of a network member at the Avenue du Président-Wilson in Paris. Signalled to flee by an employee who opened the door to him, he ran back down the staircase, suffering bullet wounds to his arm and heel, but escaped to the métro and was treated in a clinic on fr:Rue Violet. When told of this, Keun quickly returned from England to continue to courier parcels. Arnould became the sole leader of the network when Keun was captured, deported to Buchenwald and executed in 1944.

== Post-War role, legacy and death ==
After the Liberation of France on 25 August, Arnould worked for the Vatican. He was sent on numerous worldwide diplomatic missions. In 1946, he confirmed that Maurice Papon was an agent of Jade-Amicol on occasion; during the Vichy régime, Papon had been second-in-command of the police in Bordeaux and oversaw the deportation of Jews. The confirmations by leading Jade-Amicol agents of help provided to well-known politicians, security personnel and clergy, or simple confirmation of any resistance connexions, when they were perceived as collaborators affected the reputation of the network amongst some critics; such recipients of help included Cardinal Suhard, who supported Maréchal Philippe Pétain's government initially, and fr:Lucien Rotté, former police chief of Paris who was executed as a traitor to France (Arnould admitted that the network's assistance for Rotté was a mistake). Paul Baudouin, who had helped prepare the armistice with Nazi Germany and was chairman of the Banque de l'Indochine from 1941 to 1944, was hidden by Jade-Amicol after liberation to escape France, but was caught, tried and sentenced to five years' hard labour; Baudouin had used his position to provide funds for Jade-Amicol during the occupation. In 1955, Arnould was awarded 80,000 francs in damages against the author and publisher of La Banque de Indochine et la Piastre concerning allegations made in the book. In the 1966 Franco-American film Is Paris burning?, about the liberation of Paris, Arnould was played by fr:Roger Lumont.

Arnould died in the 16th arrondissement of Paris on 22 December 1978, survived by his children and grandchildren.

== Awards ==
- Croix de Guerre with bronze star and silver star – World War I
- Distinguished Service Order – 18 June 1945 (presented by General Stewart Menzies, chief of SIS)
- Légion d'Honneur – 19 December 1946
- Médaille de la Résistance française avec rosette – 27 March 1947
