= Lamirault =

Lamirault is a French surname.

== List of people with the surname ==
- Claude Lamirault (1918–1945), French military officer
- Fabien Lamirault (born 1980), French Paralympian
- Luc Lamirault (born 1962), French politician

== See also ==
- Ladmirault
