= Jardin botanique du Tourmalet =

Botanical garden in Hautes-Pyrénées, France

Coordinates: 42°54′30″N 0°08′42″E

The Jardin Botanique du Tourmalet (two hectares) is a botanical garden specializing in the flora of the Pyrenees. It is at the Pont de la Gaube on the road to the Col du Tourmalet, four kilometres from Barèges, Hautes-Pyrénées, Midi-Pyrénées, France, and open daily in the warmer months; an admission fee is charged. The garden was established in 1996 at an elevation of 1500 meters. It contains about 2500 species drawn primarily from regional flora.

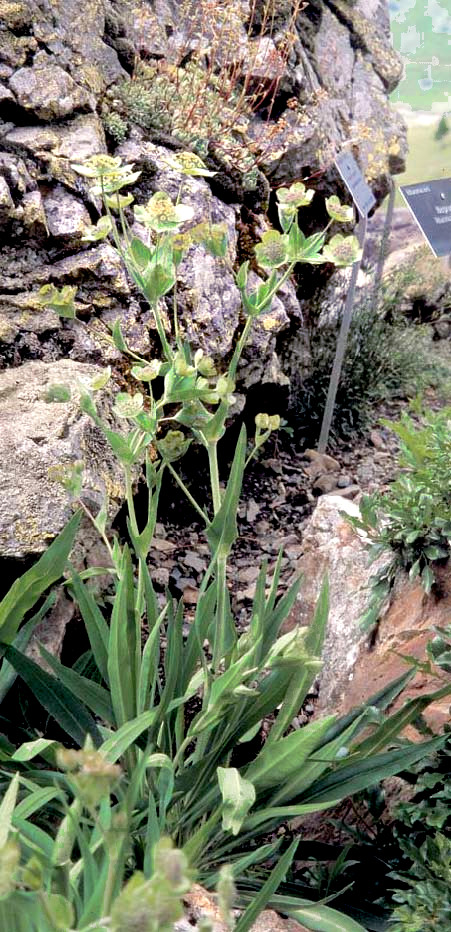
Jardin botanique du Tourmalet

== See also ==
- List of botanical gardens in France
