= Ladmirault =

Ladmirault is a surname. Notable people with the surname include:

- Paul Ladmirault (1877–1944), French composer and music critic
- Paul de Ladmirault (1808–1898), French general

== See also ==
- Lamirault
