= Raymond Dupouy =

Jean Dupouy (2 April 1911 – 11 August 1944), was a French insurance agent, a Catholic activist and a member of the French Resistance. He was executed by the Nazis in 1944.

== Biography ==
He was born in the city of Bordeaux to Marguerite Marie (née Dulucq) and Pierre Georges. He married Marthe Octavie Bouyx. They had two children and the family lived in Bordeaux, where he did his insurance agency work. A strong Catholic activist, he became the regional president of the fr:Association Catholique de la Jeunesse Française. Along with Marguerite Dupouy, he was active in the Comité National Catholique d’accueil aux Basques (National Catholic Committee for the reception of the Basques) from its inception in 1937; the word 'Basques' was changed to réfugiés d’Espagne to accommodate refugees of varying backgrounds escaping the Spanish Civil War. Dupouy helped Antoine Dieuzayde, a Basque Jesuit, organise the reception of the refugees from his base at the foyer Henri Bazire, rue du Pont-de-la-Mousque, and also at the camp de Bernard Rollo in Barèges. He also organised Semaines Sociales assemblies in 1939 to discuss problems with class and social order.

=== World War II and resistance membership ===
At the outbreak of World War II, he was mobilised as a lieutenant in the artillery. He avoided capture in June 1940 when his unit was overrun by Nazi forces. After demobilisation, he was a creator of the fr:Secours national in Bordeaux. In 1941, he was arrested by the French police and sentenced by the Nazi authorities to three months in prison at the fr:Fort du Hâ for having taken part in a parade to celebrate Jeanne d'Arc. Upon his release, he found that he was on a list of Gironde's 'designated hostages'. He became a resistance member and moved first to Lyon, then Isère, where he was recruited by the fr:École des cadres d'Uriage, a youth-oriented leadership school which had distanced itself from the Vichy régime and was producing resistance leaders for Savoie, Haute-Savoie and Vercors; in 1942, he was the school's secretary general. The school was closed on 1 January 1943. Dupouy then became the host of the intelligence service made up of alumni from the school, moving from town to town accompanied by his wife. He returned to Isère after 6 June 1944 and became deputy to commandant Alain Le Ray, leader of the Forces Françaises de l'Intérieur (F.F.I.) in Isère in 1944, in the departmental staff. He was also a member of secteur 1 of the Armée secrète of Isère. He was arrested on 31 July 1944 in Grenoble, carrying information evidently relating to the resistance. He was tortured and imprisoned in the Bonne barracks in Grenoble, where he shared his final days in the same cell as the Jesuit priest, philosopher and theologian, fr:Yves de Montcheuil. He was executed on the night of 10–11 August, with Fr. de Montcheuil and twenty-two others.

=== Post war investigations ===
The twenty-four bodies had been buried in a bomb crater. The grave was discovered on 26 August 1944. His body was identified by Mme. Ardain from the school in Isère and later officially by the funeral director, a family friend. He was cited by Xavier de Virieu, commanding officer of the F.F.I., on 25 September at the inauguration of the F.F.I. d'Uriage. He was declared as Mort pour la France and posthumously awarded the Médaille de la Résistance française. In 1946, his remains were exhumed and reinterred in the fr:Cimetière de la Chartreuse in Bordeaux. His name is on the monument to the dead in Bordeaux and likely also the memorial of the Maquis de l'Oisans in Livet-et-Gavet as Raymond 'Dupont'.
