= Betpouey =

- Commune
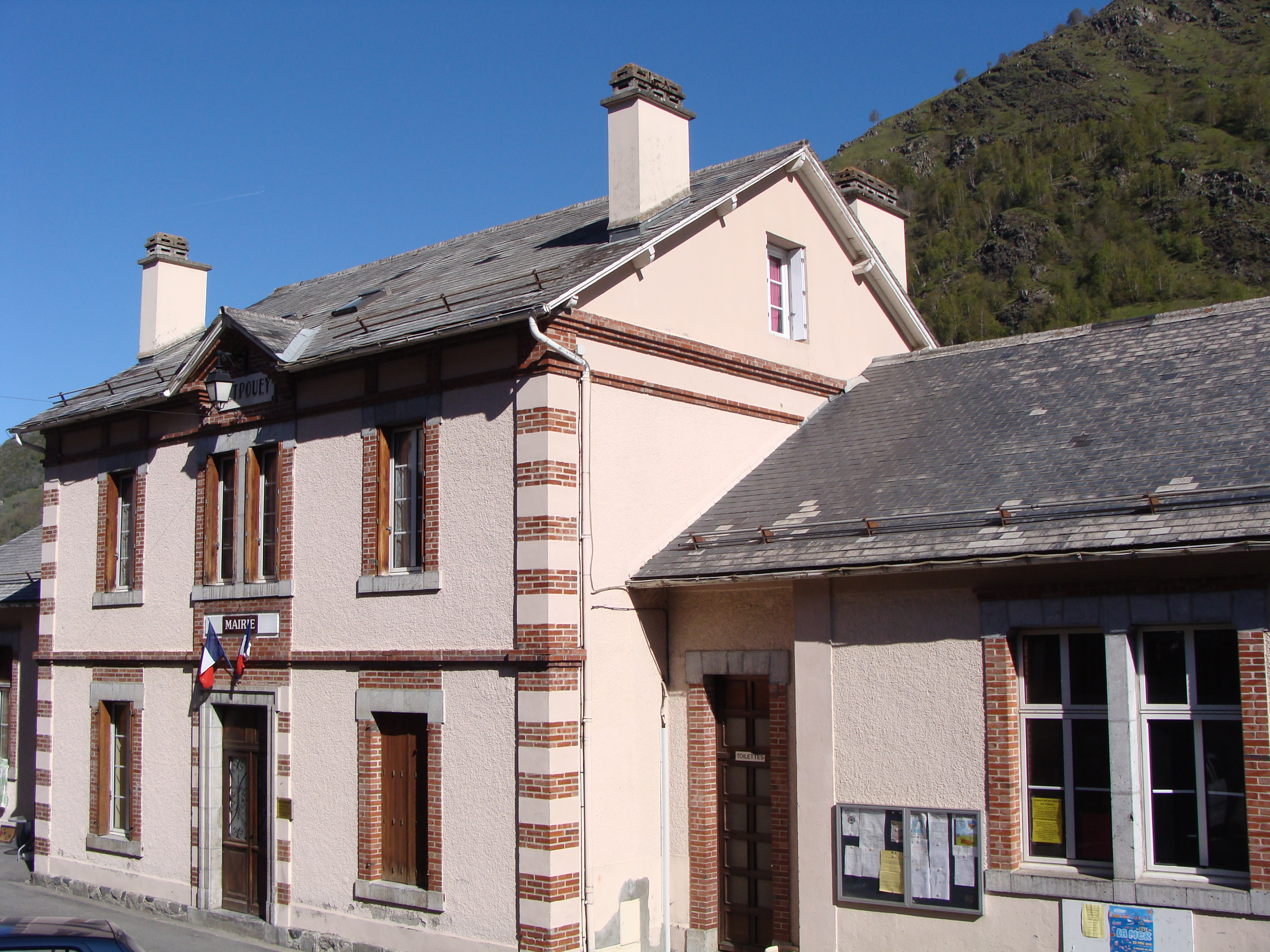
- The town hall

- Coat of arms
- Location of Betpouey
- Location within France Location within Occitanie
- Coordinates: 42°52′57″N 0°02′02″E
- Country: France
- Region: Occitania
- Department: Hautes-Pyrénées
- Arrondissement: Argelès-Gazost
- Canton: La Vallée des Gaves

Government
  - Mayor (2020–2026): Bernard Souberbielle
- Area^{1}: 16.2 km^{2} (6.3 sq mi)
- Elevation: 1,250 m (4,100 ft)
- Highest elevation: 2,854 m (9,364 ft)
- Lowest elevation: 899 m (2,949 ft)
- Population (2023): 78
  - Density: 4.8/km^{2} (12/sq mi)
- Time zone: UTC+01:00 (CET)
  - Summer (DST): UTC+02:00 (CEST)
- INSEE/Postal code: 65089 /65120
- ^{1} French Land Register data, which excludes lakes, ponds, glaciers > 1 km^{2} (0.386 sq mi or 247 acres) and river estuaries.

Betpouey is a commune in the Hautes-Pyrénées department in southwestern France.

== Geography ==
The Petite Baïse forms part of the commune's southwestern border, then flows north through the middle of the commune.

== Population ==
Historical population
Year	Pop.	±% p.a.
1968	226	—
1975	175	−3.59%
1982	160	−1.27%
1990	149	−0.89%
1999	128	−1.67%
2007	111	−1.77%
2012	111	+0.00%
2017	87	−4.76%
2023	78	−1.80%
Source: INSEE

== See also ==
- Communes of the Hautes-Pyrénées department
