= Lycée Saint-Joseph-de-Tivoli =

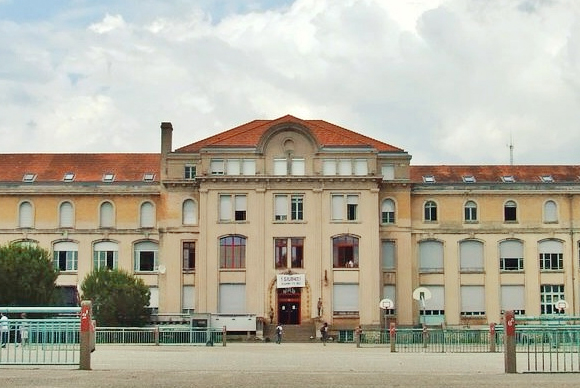
- Lycée Saint-Joseph-de-Tivoli, Bordeaux, in 2014

Location
- Bordeaux, Gironde; France
- Coordinates: 44°51′13.25″N 0°35′49.84″W

Information
- Other name: Tivoli
- Type: Private secondary school
- Religious affiliation: Catholicism
- Denomination: Jesuit
- Patron saint: Saint Joseph
- Established: 1850; 176 years ago
- Director: Mr. Lourme
- Grades: KG-12; through technical college
- Gender: Co-educational
- Enrollment: Over 2,000
- Website: tivoli-33.org

Lycée Saint-Joseph-de-Tivoli, commonly called "Tivoli", is a private Catholic elementary and secondary school with technical college, located in Bordeaux, in the Gironde department of France. The school was founded by the Society of Jesus in 1850.

== High school ranking ==
In 2015, the high school ranked 2nd among 46 at the departmental level, in terms of teaching quality, and 95th at the national level.

== Notable alumni ==
- Martial Piéchaud (1888–1957)
- François de Vial (1904–1985)

== See also ==
- Catholic Church in France
- Education in France
- List of Jesuit schools
