= Philip Keun =

British-born soldier (1911–1944)

Gerald Philip George Keun (10 August 1911 – 9 September 1944) known as Philip Keun (sometimes Kane) was a British-born soldier serving in the French Foreign Legion (claiming Dutch nationality), the French Resistance and then as a captain in the Special Operations Executive (SOE). He was co-leader of the Jade-Amicol network of the French resistance, which operated under the auspices of the British Secret Intelligence Service (SIS), commonly known as MI6.

== Biography ==
Keun was born on 10 August 1911, in Tiverton, Devon to Germaine Denise Thérèse (née Feydeau) from Paris and George Benjamin Edward Keun. His parents divorced three years after he was born. He attended Blundell's School in Tiverton. After completing his school studies, he went to Sofia. At the onset of World War II, he enlisted in the French Army in the Régiments de marche de volontaires étrangers (Marching Regiments of Foreign Volunteers), giving his nationality as Dutch and his place of birth as Chatou. His regiment was surrounded and defeated near Soissons by Nazi Germany. Keun was injured and taken prisoner in Dunkirk. He escaped from a prisoner-of-war camp at Cambrai.

=== The French Resistance and the Jade-Amicol Network ===
Keun made contact with French resistance members and became an active participant. In November 1940, he met leading resistance member Claude Arnould. Arnould was a French civil servant, former diplomatic military secretary and sergeant in the French army from north-eastern France, who had been organising connexions based in the south-west of France, mainly recruiting through Catholic institutions and their contacts. At the same time, Keun became known to British intelligence and towards the end of 1941, the structure of a new resistance network was finalised. Keun had managed to infiltrate the Vichy Marine Intelligence Service. He was officially enlisted with the SOE and given the rank of captain by the British, also using the name 'Kane'. With Keun and Arnould as leaders, a new network was created with the name "Jade-Amicol", after the semi-precious gem and letters from Keun's codename, "Amiral", and one of Arnould's codenames, "Colonel". The network was under the overall control of the SIS; Keun's father was friends with Commander Wilfred Dunderdale a leading SIS officer and liaison with the Deuxième Bureau (French intelligence service until World War II). A Paris headquarters was set up by Keun in the chapel of a hospital convent in fr:Rue de la Santé, which received refugees and allied staff. All air communications with the UK and within France were successful. Communications and logistics via London went through Keun. He spent most of his time in France but went twice to England.

Jade-Amicol was paired initially with the fr:Jade-Fitzroy network of Claude Lamirault, but divisions grew from the end of 1941 because of character differences, security lapses and arrests. Keun confided in fr:Victor Chatenay, the creator of the resistance network Honneur et Patrie and later a sénateur and député, that he thought Lamirault hated him so much that he could sell Keun out. The split was finalised in June 1943.

Keun's second return to France came unexpectedly after hearing that Arnould had survived and escaped from a Nazi ambush in December 1943, despite being shot twice. Keun, although exhausted, parachuted into France and damaged some vertebrae on landing. Despite the pain and warnings from a doctor about paralysis, he continued to courier parcels by cycling for many kilometres. After the Normandy landings on 6 June 1944, he moved the Paris headquarters to an abandoned farm in Gué de la Thas between Vienne and Val et Marcy en Villette. The farm was surrounded by German and French Gestapo members on 29 June 1944 and Keun and others arrested. He was tortured, deported to Buchenwald Concentration Camp and hanged on 9 December 1944.

=== Awards and legacy ===
- Légion d'Honneur
- Croix de Guerre
- Médaille de la Résistance française
- King's Commendation

After Keun's death, a service was held in his honour at the Chapelle de la Sainte-Agonie in rue de la Santé on 26 June 1945. Keun's name is on the memorial at the visitor centre in Buchenwald to allied forces who died at the camp. He is also commemorated on the resistance memorial at Gué de la Thas and at Brookwood Military Cemetery, Surrey. Blundell's School placed a plaque in his memory in the school chapel. Upon his father's visit to view the plaque, he brought a silver cup that became the Philip Keun Challenge Cup, awarded to the best athlete of his former school house, Francis house. Despite his French awards, in the UK, Keun was recommended for the George Cross but was only awarded the King's Commendation, "...for the undermentioned Netherlands subject".
