= Claude Lamirault =

French military officer

Claude Maurice Georges Lamirault (12 June 1918 – 27 May 1945) was an army officer, French Resistance member and intelligence officer. He was the leader and joint founder of the Jade-Fitzroy resistance network with Pierre Hentic.

== Biography ==
He was born in the 16th arrondissement of Paris to Thérèse and Olivier Lamirault. His father was at that time a merchant. He spent his adolescent years in Maisons-Laffitte, where his parents ran a guest house. He became an activist for the far-right-wing monarchist group, Action Française in particular its network the Fédération nationale des Camelots du Roi. On 10 July 1936, after being disrespectful at a ceremony by the Arc de Triomphe during which he punched a war-widow, he was sentenced to 10 days' imprisonment, suspended, and a 25-franc fine. He completed military service in the 27e bataillon de chasseurs alpins. On 5 March 1940, he married Denise Rousselot, daughter of a typesetter. He was mobilised to the same battalion at the outbreak of World War II in 1939 and met former comrades who would later become the first members of the Jade-Fitzroy network.

=== Leadership of Jade-Fitzroy network ===
Angry at France's capitulation to Nazi Germany, he met by chance two British men – the Archibald brothers – staying in his parents' guest house; they provided an address in London. With two friends – engineers Eugène Pérot and Pierre Giran – he eventually reached England via north Africa and Gibraltar. Denise Lamirault remained behind, pregnant with their first child. An official at general Charles de Gaulle's Carlton Gardens base in London turned them away to seek help from the British. Through the Archibalds, they were introduced to the Secret Intelligence Service, commonly known as MI6. Lamirault met Honoré d'Estienne d'Orves, to whom he expressed his impatience to return to France. He was taught the basics of using cyphers and parachuting, officially becoming an agent on 30 November 1940. On the night of 11–12 January 1941, he was parachuted alone into Bracieux and commenced the task of creating a military intelligence network in France in the free and occupied zones. He revealed his role to Denise Lamirault, who then entrusted their child to her own parents and assisted in the Jade-Fitzroy network for the next three years. Lamirault returned four times to England, each time parachuting back into France. He developed the network nationally but with the centre of operations moving to Lyon. His deputy, fr:Pierre Hentic, a fellow chasseur alpin and former communist party member who'd fought Action Française members in the streets, was in charge of air and sea operations, with transfers to and from England typically using RAF Lysanders and Royal Navy MTBs. Hentic was also in contact with Henri Bertin, leader of the Marne resistance, and Canadian Conrad Lafleur, leader of the Belgian network Possum, whom he befriended during training at RAF Ringway near Manchester. After an initial pairing between Jade-Fitzroy and the Jade-Amicol network of Claude Arnould and Philip Keun, they became independent again because of personality differences between the leaders, security lapses (resulting in a reproach for Lamirault from MI6's Wilfred Dunderdale) and arrests.

=== Arrest and final years ===
He was arrested on 15 December 1943 in at the Richelieu-Drouot metro station in Paris. Hentic was arrested on 6 January 1944. The management of the network was entrusted to Denise Lamirault until her own arrest in April 1944. Afterwards, Lamirault stated that he had been held handcuffed in solitary confinement, day and night, from his arrest until 15 May 1944, and held a further month without handcuffs before being transferred to Compiègne. On 2 July, he was transported to Dachau on the so-called "death train" with his network colleague Paul Fortier. At Osterburken, the American army liberated them but detained Lamirault and Fortier after they presented themselves as intelligence officers: evidently some suspicions remained from the time of the split with Jade-Amicol and from Lamirault's captivity. From July, the network was subsumed into the Bureau central de renseignements et d'action with the name Panta under the command of Free French officers. After returning from Germany, Lamirault resumed service as a lieutenant-colonel in the French intelligence service. He died at the wheel of a Citroën 11 CV in Orléans on 27 May 1945; also in the crash were Denise Lamirault, who suffered relatively minor injuries, and their son Bernard, who had a fractured jaw. Police reported that the car had been driven too quickly on a wet road. He was buried in Maisons-Laffitte.

== Awards and legacy ==
- Chevalier de la Légion d'Honneur
- Ordre de la Libération, posthumously by decree of 31 May 1945
- Croix de Guerre 1939-1945 with palm

The Allée Claude Lamirault in Maisons-Laffitte is named in his honour. In 1992, a plaque was inaugurated in Landéda, in the presence of Hentic, commemorating the actions of the resistance network and the allies.
