= Barèges =

- Commune
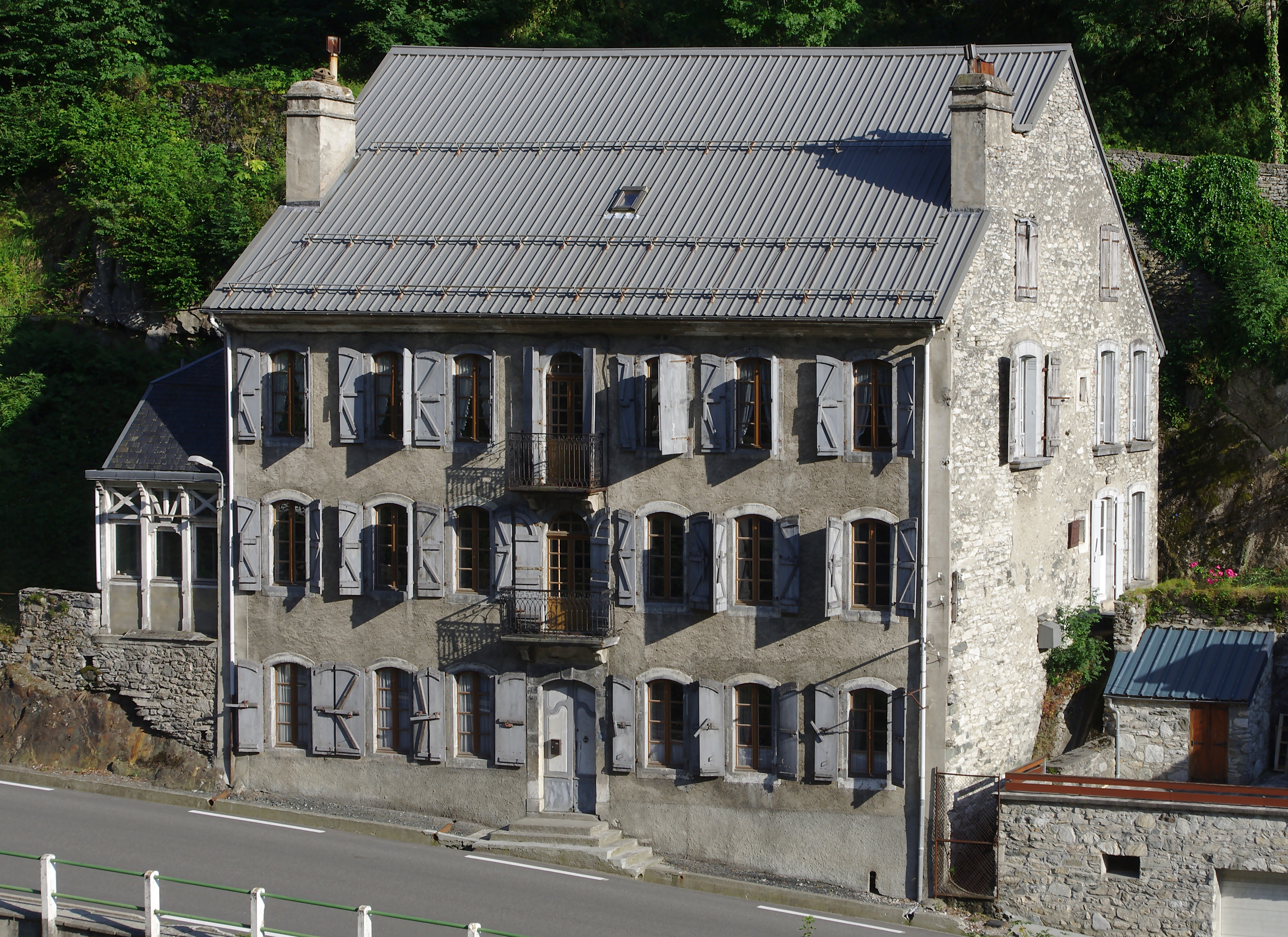
- Traditional Pyrenees house in Barèges

- Coat of arms
- Location of Barèges
- Location within France Location within Occitanie
- Coordinates: 42°53′52″N 0°03′57″E
- Country: France
- Region: Occitania
- Department: Hautes-Pyrénées
- Arrondissement: Argelès-Gazost
- Canton: La Vallée des Gaves

Government
  - Mayor (2020–2026): Pascal Arribet
- Area^{1}: 45.84 km^{2} (17.70 sq mi)
- Elevation: 1,250 m (4,100 ft)
- Highest elevation: 3,087 m (10,128 ft)
- Lowest elevation: 1,070 m (3,510 ft)
- Population (2023): 127
  - Density: 2.77/km^{2} (7.18/sq mi)
- Demonym(s): Barégeois, Barégeoise (FR)
- Time zone: UTC+01:00 (CET)
  - Summer (DST): UTC+02:00 (CEST)
- INSEE/Postal code: 65481 /65120
- ^{1} French Land Register data, which excludes lakes, ponds, glaciers > 1 km^{2} (0.386 sq mi or 247 acres) and river estuaries.

Barèges (French pronunciation: [baʁɛʒ]; Occitan: Varètja, [barˈεd͡ʒo], Barètja in the Gascon dialect) is a commune in the Hautes-Pyrénées department, administrative region of Occitania, southwestern France. It is situated in the valley of the Bastan on the former Route nationale 618 (the "Route of the Pyrenees") on the western side of the Col du Tourmalet.

Its spa has been known since the beginning of the 17th century and is the highest in the Pyrenees. It is also famous for the ski resort of Barèges, part of the Domaine du Tourmalet, as well as its landscapes.

== Geography ==
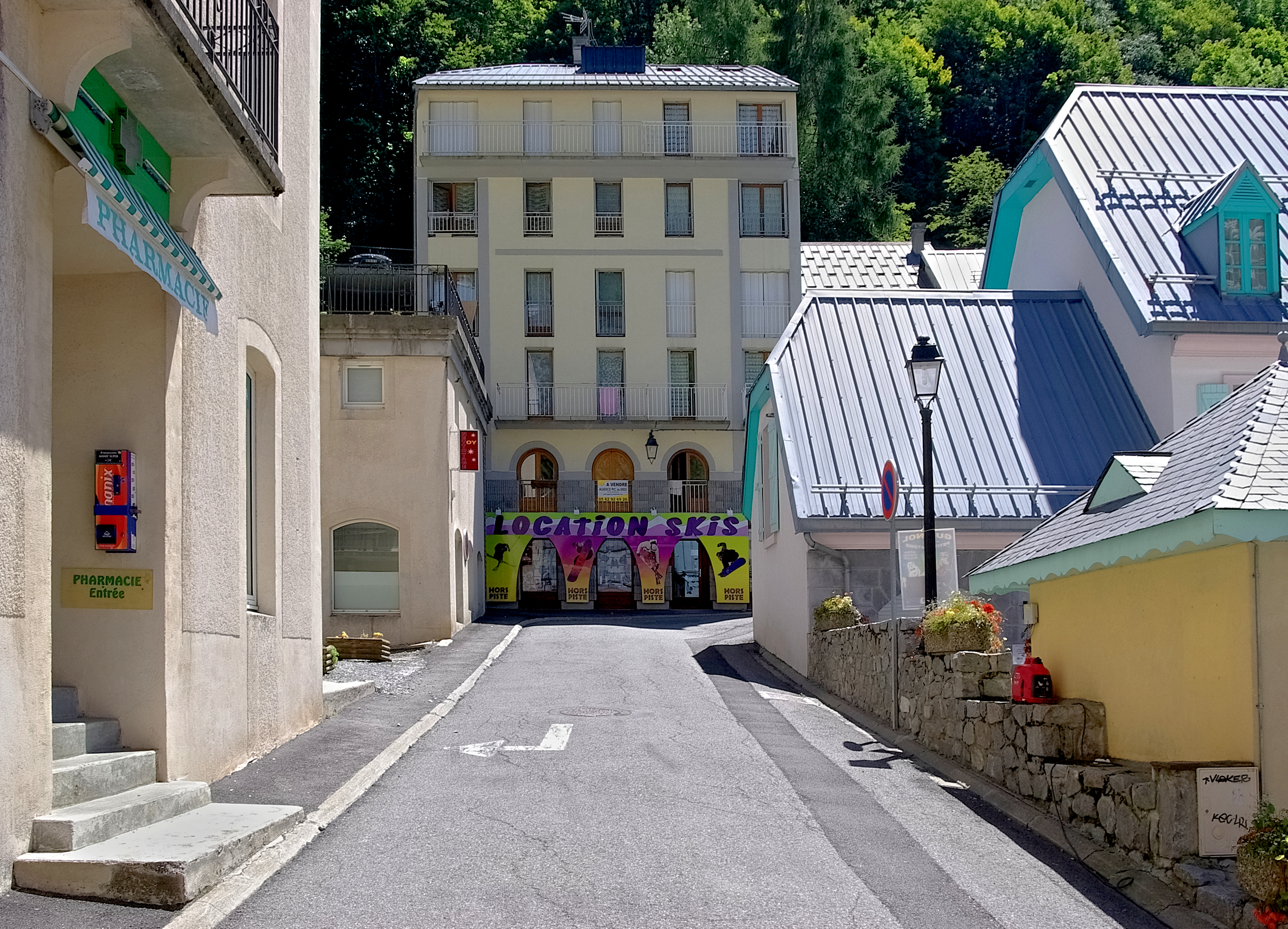
The Village

Barèges village is a small mountain village in the French Pyrenees located in the heart of the Val de la Batsus at the foot of the Col du Tourmalet and the Pic du Midi de Bigorre, which stretches along the right bank of the Bastan. The commune is located some 20 km south of Bagneres-de-Bigorre and 12 km north-west of Aragnouet.

=== Topography ===
The town is bounded in the north-west by the Bastan river, which flows from east to west in a narrow valley through the main village (at an altitude of 1250 m) and through its main inhabited areas. The Bastan forms the northern border of the commune with the commune of Sers.

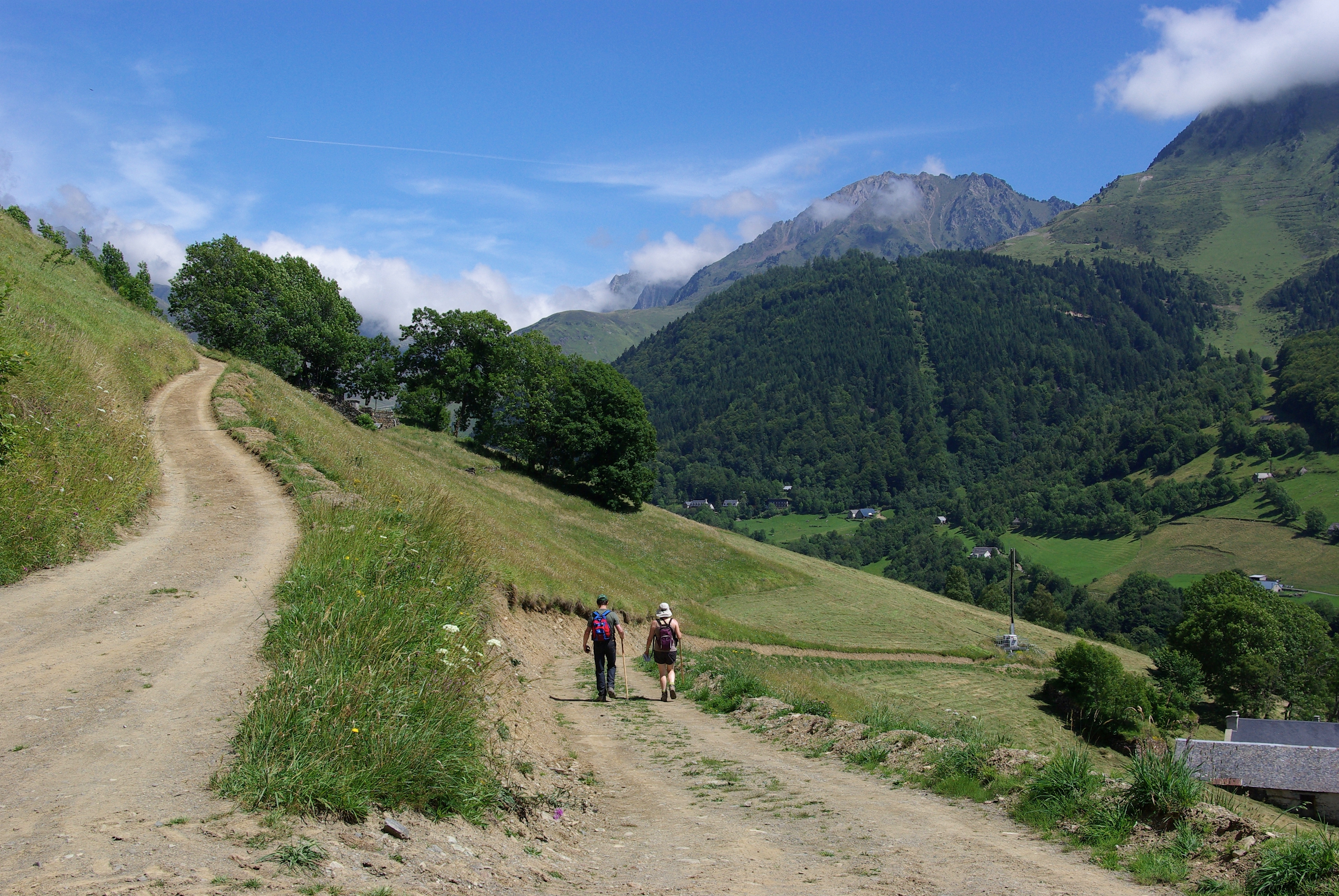
The Valley of Barèges

The rest of the territory of the commune is mostly a vast plateau surrounded by several peaks that form most of its other borders with:

- to the East: the commune overlooks the ski area shared with Bagnères-de-Bigorre, the Super Barèges station;
- to the south-east: on the border with Vielle-Aure are the peaks of Aygues-Cluses (2620 m), Gourget (2619 m, the north-east ridge is also the northernmost part of the north-western boundary of the Néouvielle National Nature Reserve), Estibère (2663 m), and Madamète (2657 m). About 1 km north of the Madamète within the commune there is Tracens peak (2551 m), which slopes towards the middle of the plateau;
- to the south: on the border of the exclave of Soulan (Saint-Lary-Soulan) are the Crêtes d'Espade (Espade ridges) leading to the Pic de Néouvielle (3091 m) which also marks the southern part of the north-western boundary of the Néouvielle National Nature Reserve;
- to the south-west: on the border of Luz-Saint-Sauveur are the Pic des Trois conseillers (Peak of three councilors) (3039 m), the Turon de Néouvielle (3035 m), the Coume de l'Ours Peak (2855 m), and Mont Arrouy (2772 m but actually located in Luz-Saint-Sauveur and closer to the border with Betpouey, but the north face descends to the plateau in Barèges);
- to the west: on the border with Betpouey and close to Barèges village is the Ayre Peak (2416 m) with a cable car up its north face from the village and ski lifts in winter.

=== Access and transport ===
The village sits on the D918 road, which to the west leads down the valley to Lourdes, Tarbes and Tarbes-Lourdes-Pyrénées Airport. To the north-east, the road continues up the valley to the Col du Tourmalet and onwards to Arreau and Bagnères-de-Bigorre.

=== Hydrology ===
The Bastan river, known locally as the "Gave de Bastan", is a right tributary of the Gave de Gavarnie and has its source in the north-east of the commune near the Col du Tourmalet, whose slopes and the slopes of the surrounding peaks supply water. The Ruisseau d'Aygues Cluses rises in the south-east of the commune and flows north to join the Bastan. The Ruisseau de la Glère flows north from the Lac de la Glère in the south-west of the commune to join the Bastan east of the village. Two small streams rise south of the village and flow north to join the Bastan: the Ruisseau de Rioulet and the Ruisseau du Pontis.

The mountainous plateau that forms the largest area of the commune is dotted with small lakes that feed the streams flowing to the Bastan.

In February 2013, an avalanche blocked the Bastan at the height of the Barèges Spa and the town was evacuated. On 31 May 2013, snow accumulated and there was an avalanche below the Lienz which covered nearly 200 metres of the bed of the Bastan. After a heatwave on 15 and 16 June followed by thunderstorms and incessant rain on 17 and 18 June, there was rising water associated with snowmelt. Hampered by the remains of the avalanche, the waters of the Bastan overflowed the road on the right bank, the Place de Barèges (Town Square), then the HLM parking, camping area, and seven houses, but there were no injuries reported. The Thermal Baths of Barzun were also heavily damaged. The stricken town was evacuated on June 19 through an unusual opening of the Col du Tourmalet, which is always under snow.

=== Climate ===
Barèges has an oceanic climate (Köppen climate classification Cfb). The average annual temperature in Barèges is 8.9 °C (48.0 °F). The average annual rainfall is 1,235.3 mm (48.63 in) with November as the wettest month. The temperatures are highest on average in August, at around 16.0 °C (60.8 °F), and lowest in January, at around 2.5 °C (36.5 °F). The highest temperature ever recorded in Barèges was 37.0 °C (98.6 °F) on 16 August 1987; the coldest temperature ever recorded was −18.0 °C (−0.4 °F) on 17 December 1946.

Climate data for Barèges (1981−2010 normals, extremes 1944−2003)
Month	Jan	Feb	Mar	Apr	May	Jun	Jul	Aug	Sep	Oct	Nov	Dec	Year
Record high °C (°F)	21.0 (69.8)	22.0 (71.6)	24.0 (75.2)	30.0 (86.0)	30.0 (86.0)	34.0 (93.2)	35.0 (95.0)	37.0 (98.6)	34.0 (93.2)	29.0 (84.2)	24.0 (75.2)	18.0 (64.4)	37.0 (98.6)
Mean daily maximum °C (°F)	6.4 (43.5)	7.5 (45.5)	10.6 (51.1)	11.5 (52.7)	15.2 (59.4)	18.6 (65.5)	21.5 (70.7)	21.9 (71.4)	19.3 (66.7)	15.4 (59.7)	10.3 (50.5)	6.9 (44.4)	13.8 (56.8)
Daily mean °C (°F)	2.5 (36.5)	3.0 (37.4)	5.6 (42.1)	6.7 (44.1)	10.1 (50.2)	13.3 (55.9)	15.7 (60.3)	16.0 (60.8)	13.6 (56.5)	10.4 (50.7)	6.0 (42.8)	3.3 (37.9)	8.9 (48.0)
Mean daily minimum °C (°F)	−1.4 (29.5)	−1.5 (29.3)	0.6 (33.1)	1.9 (35.4)	5.0 (41.0)	7.9 (46.2)	9.9 (49.8)	10.1 (50.2)	7.9 (46.2)	5.4 (41.7)	1.8 (35.2)	−0.3 (31.5)	4.0 (39.2)
Record low °C (°F)	−16.0 (3.2)	−18.0 (−0.4)	−14.0 (6.8)	−10.0 (14.0)	−7.0 (19.4)	−2.0 (28.4)	−1.0 (30.2)	0.0 (32.0)	−3.0 (26.6)	−7.0 (19.4)	−10.0 (14.0)	−18.0 (−0.4)	−18.0 (−0.4)
Average precipitation mm (inches)	128.0 (5.04)	91.9 (3.62)	99.4 (3.91)	125.0 (4.92)	108.9 (4.29)	85.4 (3.36)	74.6 (2.94)	72.6 (2.86)	83.8 (3.30)	104.0 (4.09)	139.2 (5.48)	122.5 (4.82)	1,235.3 (48.63)
Average precipitation days (≥ 1.0 mm)	10.8	10.1	10.5	12.5	15.3	12.1	9.5	10.0	10.1	12.1	11.7	11.2	136.8
Source: Météo-France

== History ==
In the 7th century, the people of the Barèges Valley were subjected to women - there was a custom that men served their wives with all marks of respect.

Under the Treaty of Corbeil in 1258, James I of Aragon renounced his claim to Occitania inherited from his ancestors, the Counts of Barcelona. In return King Louis IX of France agreed to waive his own claims to the Catalan counties. Effectively, as the descendants of Charlemagne, the kings of France have always retained their rights over the old Marca Hispanica. In this way the Vallée libre de Barèges (Free Valley of Barèges) was established.

Administratively, the town of Bains was a dependency of the village of Betpouey located downstream on the Bastan. A small mountain village was built around a thermal springs. It is not known when its hot springs were discovered. Tradition has it that the shepherds were the first users. They had noticed that sick or injured sheep came to soak in the hot and sulphurous waters.

Its warm sulphurous waters first became generally known in 1675 when they were visited by Madame de Maintenon and Louis Auguste, Duke of Maine, son of Louis XIV.

The commune owes its current name to Madame de Maintenon who, during her stay in 1675 in the village of Bains, dated her letters "Barèges" although that designation belonged to the whole Barèges Valley or, in the political sense, the valley of Bastan and that of the Gave de Gavarnie. The town was just called Les Bains in reference to its thermal baths.

In 1680 Louvois, Secretary of State and Minister of State for Louis XIV came to the Barèges Baths to treat a leg fracture. On returning to Versailles he obtained credits from Colbert for the first military hospital for the comfort of hydrotherapy.

In 1762 a flood from the Bastan took away 17 houses in the small spa town.

Barèges appears as Bareges les Bains on the 1750 Cassini Map and the same on the 1790 version.

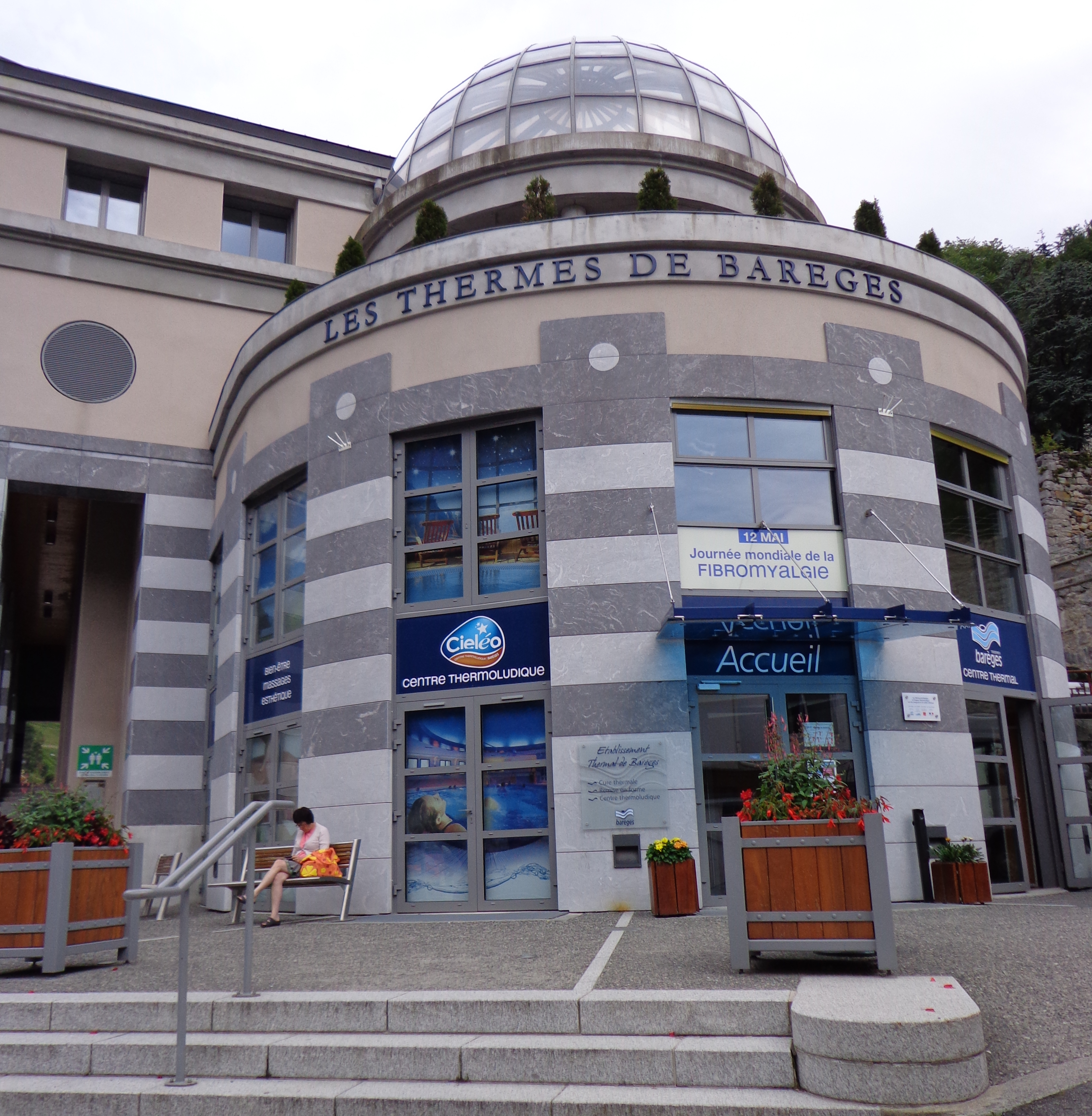
The Thermal Baths

In 1946 the old town of Bains, now more commonly known as simply Barèges, was separated from its former parent of Betpouey as the interests of Betpouey and the tourism in Barèges did not match. In addition the remoteness of the village made administrative tasks difficult, especially in winter due to new activities in the development of winter sports. The commune of Barèges was then created retaining the simple name popularized by Madame de Maintenon and the subsequent success of its thermal baths.

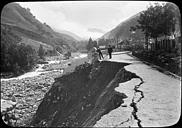
Damaged road in 2014

Following very heavy rain (with a red meteorological vigilance rating for Flood in the department) linked to late melting of most of the winter snow, the village of Barèges was seriously damaged on 18 and 19 June 2013. The Bastan river overflowed so violently that several buildings and parts of roads were destroyed with the cutting of electricity and telephone services. No deaths were however reported. The President of the Republic, François Hollande, visited to see the damage on 7 July 2013.

=== Heraldry ===
Arms of Barèges	The presence of a pair of skis on the coat of arms shows that it is recent. The chamois symbolizes the Pyrenees National Park, the skis the ski area of Bareges-La Mongie, and the fountain the spa. Blazon: Party per bend, at 1 Gules, an izard of Or contourned regardant to dexter; at 2 Azure, a fountain of Or; over all debruised by a pair of skis Argent in bend.

== Administration ==
List of Successive Mayors

From	To	Name
1946	1977	Urbain Cazaux
1977	1995	André Sabathier
1995	2000	Emmanuel Corret
2000	2001	Philippe Trey
2001	2008	Jean-Claude Crampe
2008	2014	Emmanuel Corret
2014	2026	Pascal Arribet

== Demography ==
In French, the inhabitants of the commune are known as Barégeois (pronounced [baʁeʒwa]) or Barégeoises ([baʁeʒwaz]).

Historical population

Year	Pop.	±% p.a.
1946	328	—
1954	374	+1.65%
1962	286	−3.30%
1968	332	+2.52%
1975	279	−2.45%
1982	282	+0.15%

Year	Pop.	±% p.a.
1990	257	−1.15%
1999	258	+0.04%
2007	233	−1.27%
2012	175	−5.56%
2017	163	−1.41%
2023	127	−4.07%

Source: EHESS and INSEE

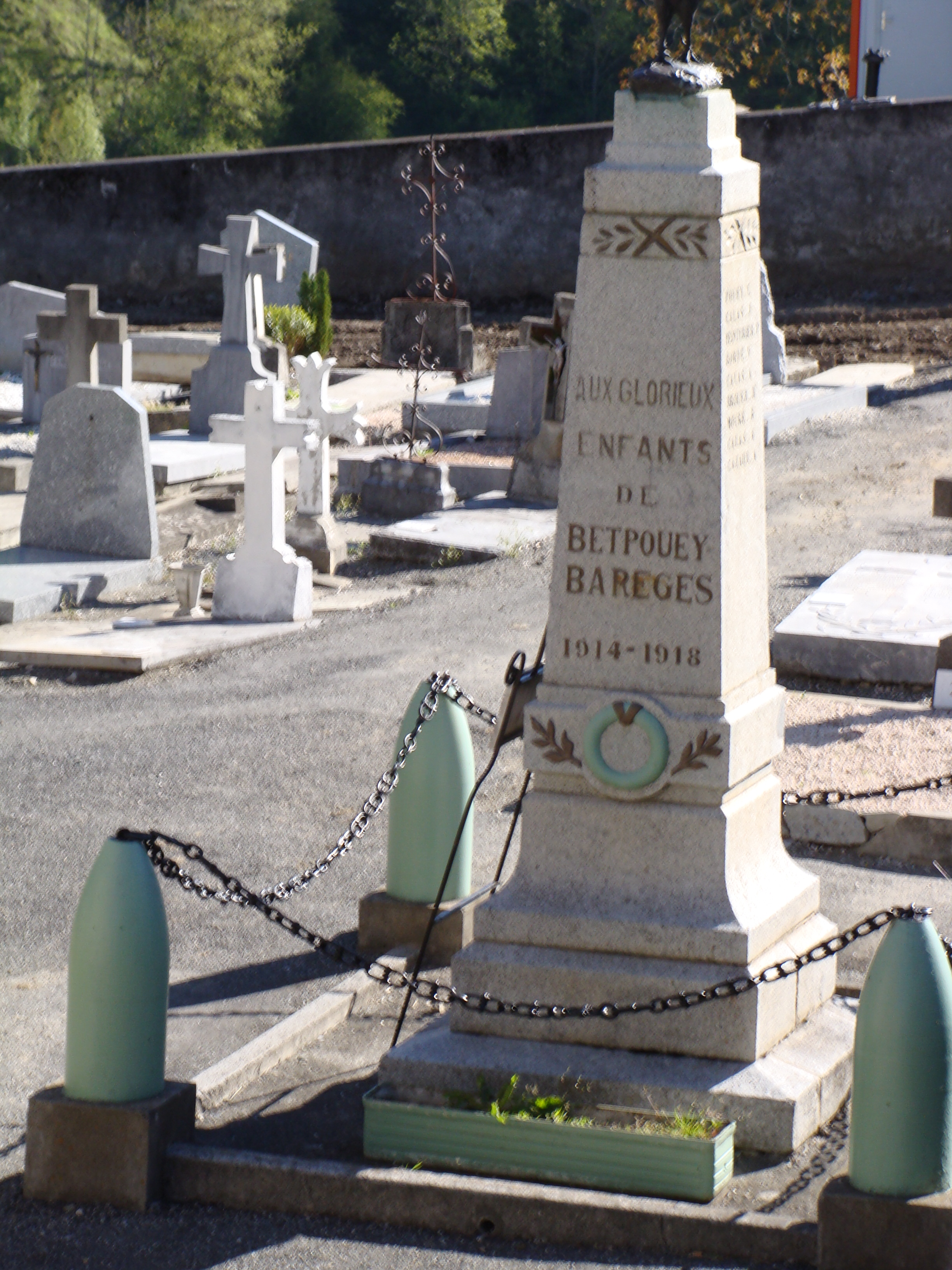
The War Memorial

== Economy ==
Thermal Baths Photo Gallery

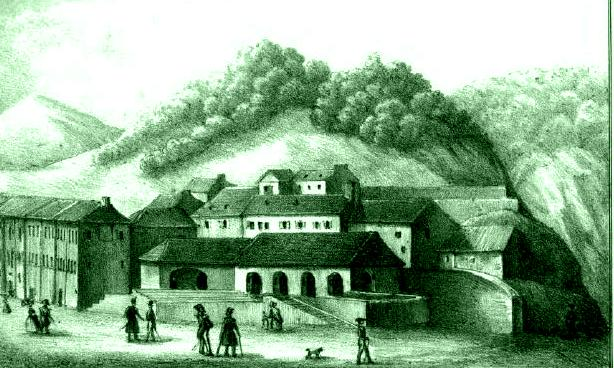
The Thermal Baths in 1841

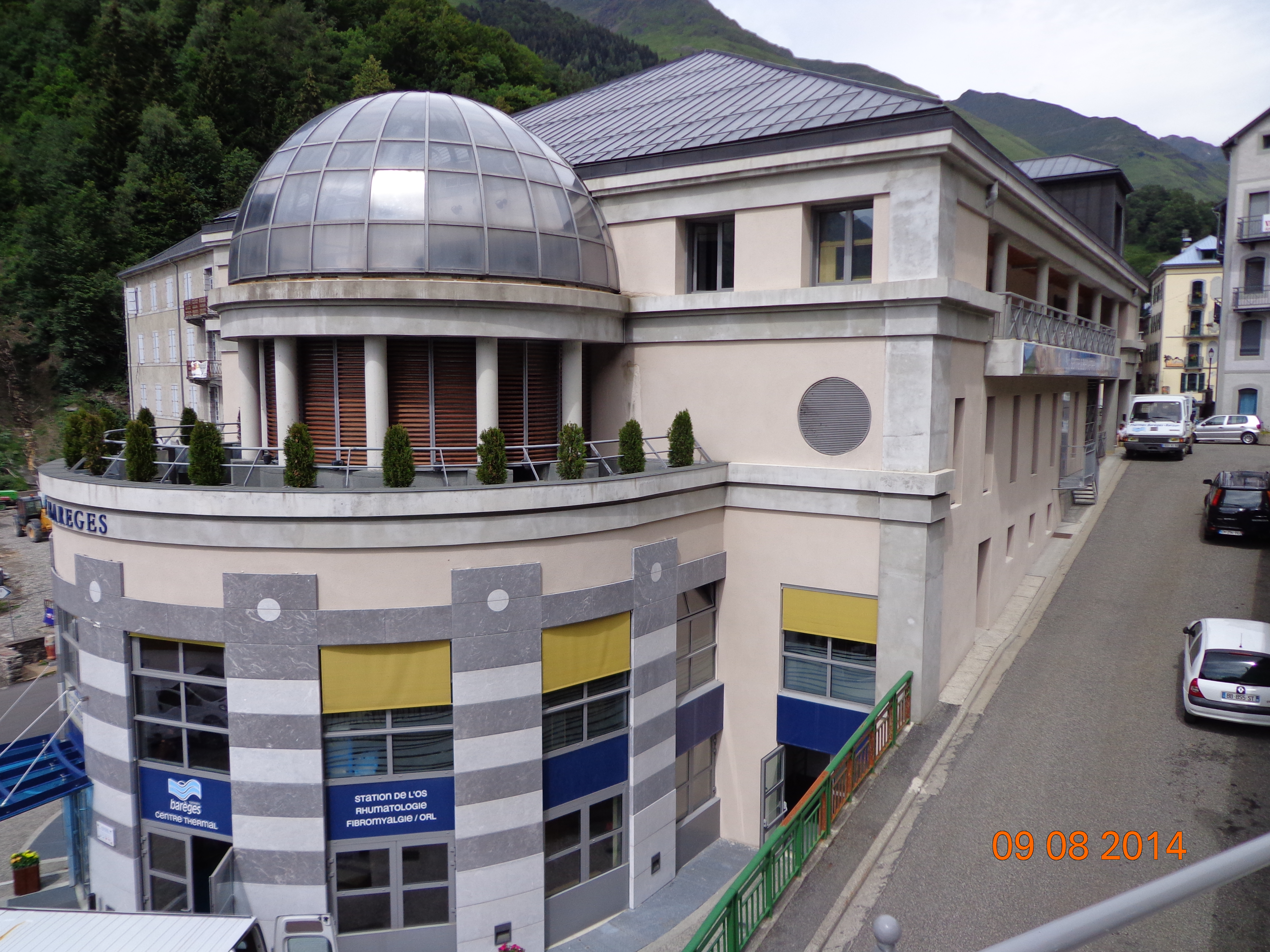
The Thermal Baths

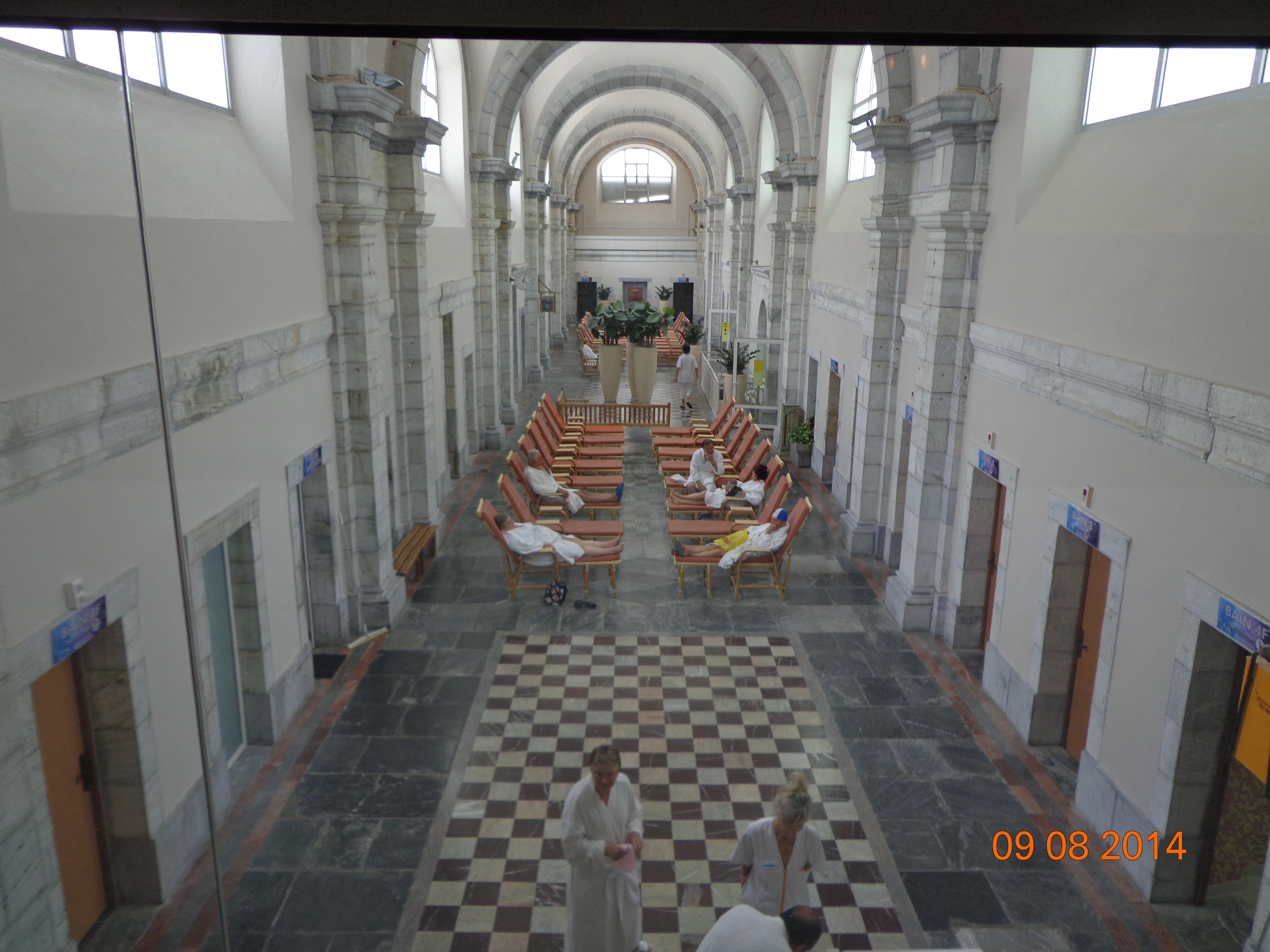
Inside the Baths

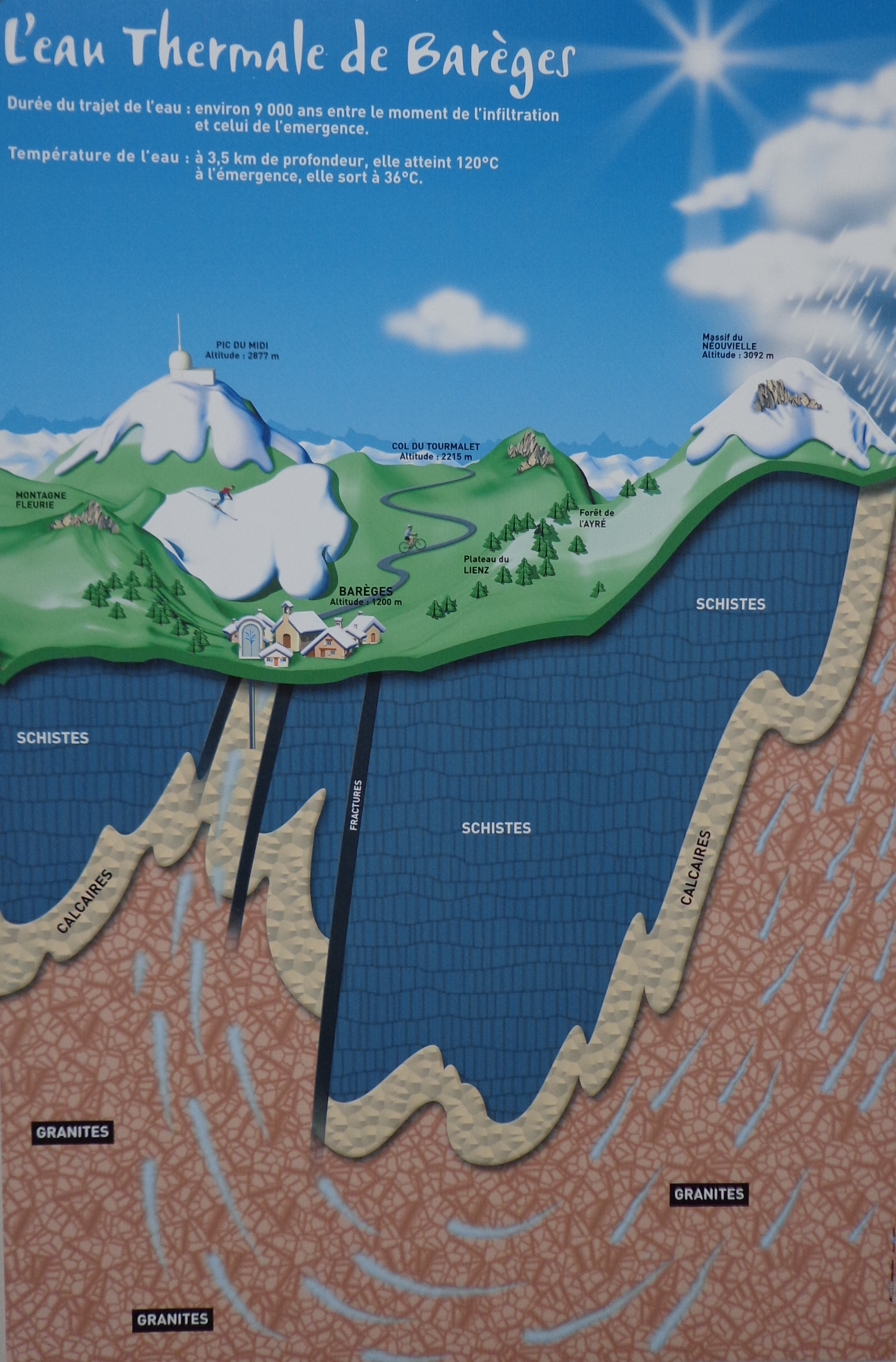
Geological diagram

=== Tourism ===
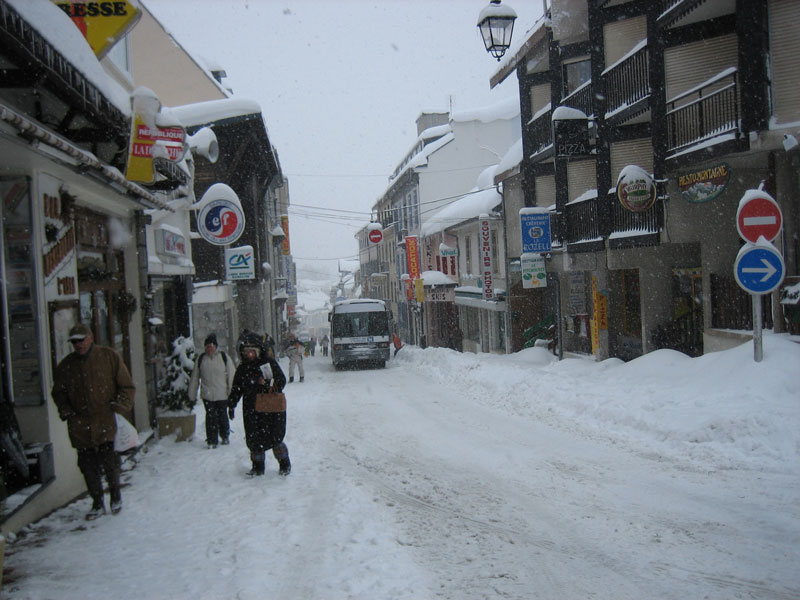
Winter in the Village

Barèges is situated at the perimeter of the National Parc of the Pyrénées. In and around the village all mountain sports are practiced, such as paragliding, walking, cycling, canyoning/caving, mountain climbing, mountain biking, and more.

Barèges is also the second oldest ski resort in France, and when the funicular was opened in 1936 the resort became a tourist destination. The resort, now linked with La Mongie, is the largest ski area in the French Pyrénées.

The historic Funicular of Ayré started from the centre of Barèges and had an intermediate stop on the height of the plateau of Lienz. Later in 1947 it was extended and allowed to reach an altitude of 2005 m on the northern flank of Ayré Peak (which rises to 2416 m). In the early 1950s Électricité de France (EDF) implanted a huge construction site a little higher still (at 150 m below the top of the Ayré) to make an 11 km long tunnel to store water from the Néouvielle Massif and from the Gavarnie for the Capdelong Dam and bring them through the mountains to the Pragnères hydroelectric plant. The existing funicular could not be extended and a cable car was built by EDF, first for its own use to connect to the tunnel construction site base camp and the refuge of Glère nearby (the remains of the tunnel construction and the base camp have not yet, in 2013, been cleaned).

With the development of tourism, the EDF cable car was then slightly modified to be also used by skiers and hikers visiting the refuge. When the piste which now descends to the refuge was established in the early 1980s, the cable car, which was no longer used for the transportation of engineers controlling the work (who were much less numerous than during construction) was downgraded. When it no longer met safety standards and it was no longer necessary to go to the refuge due to the new piste, the cable car was stopped completely and dismantled in the 1990s.

The old Funicular of Ayré was also closed in 2000 due to aging structures and safety, despite the maintenance and modernization of buildings and equipment that had taken place over the decades. As of 2013 it has not reopened but a new project is being supported by the council, much of the population, and the friends of the station to restore the structures and aging equipment to modern standards (this is the largest and most expensive part of the work required excluding the subsequent operating costs), to modernise and diversify activities in the resort, and to reopen year round tourism.

A cable car (1954–1968) and then a Gondola lift (1968–2002) also connected Barèges to Laquette (altitude 1715 m). As it no longer met safety standards it was removed. The only vestige of the cable car is the departure station on the right bank of Bastan above Barèges in the Aygat locality which was also used for the Gondola lift going up to the plateau of Lienz.

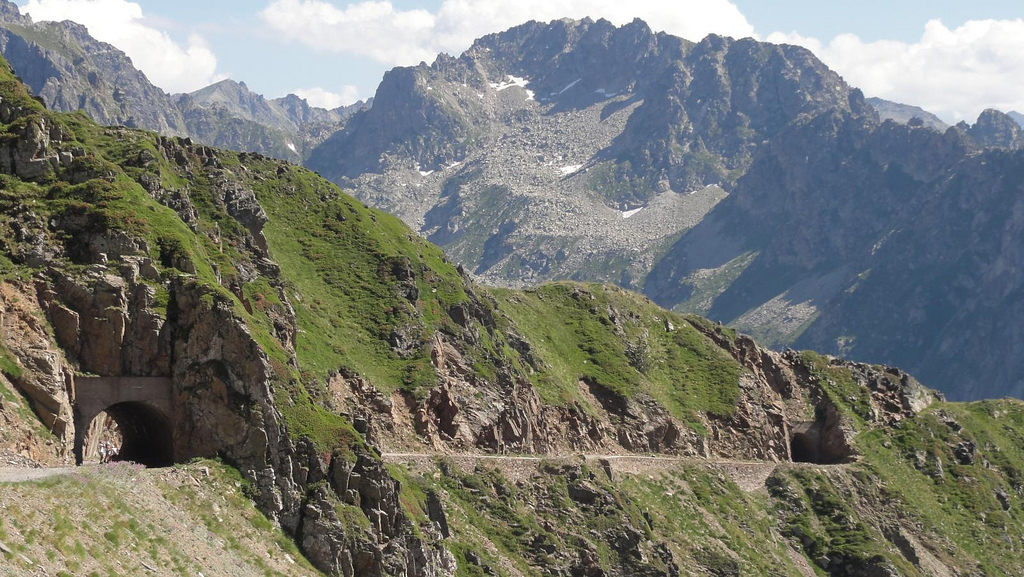
Tunnels to Super-Baràges

In order to ski since 2002 the ascent has been by car or bus from the D918 road (along the Bastan) to the departure point for the lifts at Tournaboup which has been built with ample parking, ticketing, and an ESF office. It is sometimes possible to access Super Barèges via the Col du Tourmalet (the road is often closed in winter or requires special equipment). The pass road is dangerous and the small resort does not allow extended parking for numerous ski vehicles so this station has been closed to non-resident passenger vehicles which must remain parked at Tournaboup and reach Super Barèges by the Caoubère and Tourmalet chairlifts which connect Barèges to La Mongie.

=== Gastronomy ===
Barèges-Gavarnie is an Appellation d'origine contrôlée (AOC) for French Mutton. This AOC was created in 2003.

=== Fashion ===
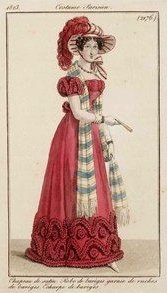
Parisian Costume Satin Hat. Barège gown trimmed with Barège frills. Barège scarf, 1823

Barège is a type of goat wool which was originally made in Barèges. The undercoat from the goat fleeces yield a kind of lightweight wool and used as a Cashmere wool for a particular weave in gowns, scarves, and necklaces.

Barèges gowns are cited by Victor Hugo in Les Misérables, and in both Madame Bovary and Sentimental Education by Gustave Flaubert.

George Sand wrote on 28 August 1825, when in Bagneres-de-Bigorre, in a letter to her mother: "Je vous porterais du barège de Barèges" (I would bring you some barège from Barèges).

Barèges Town Festival 15 August 2014 - Wool working

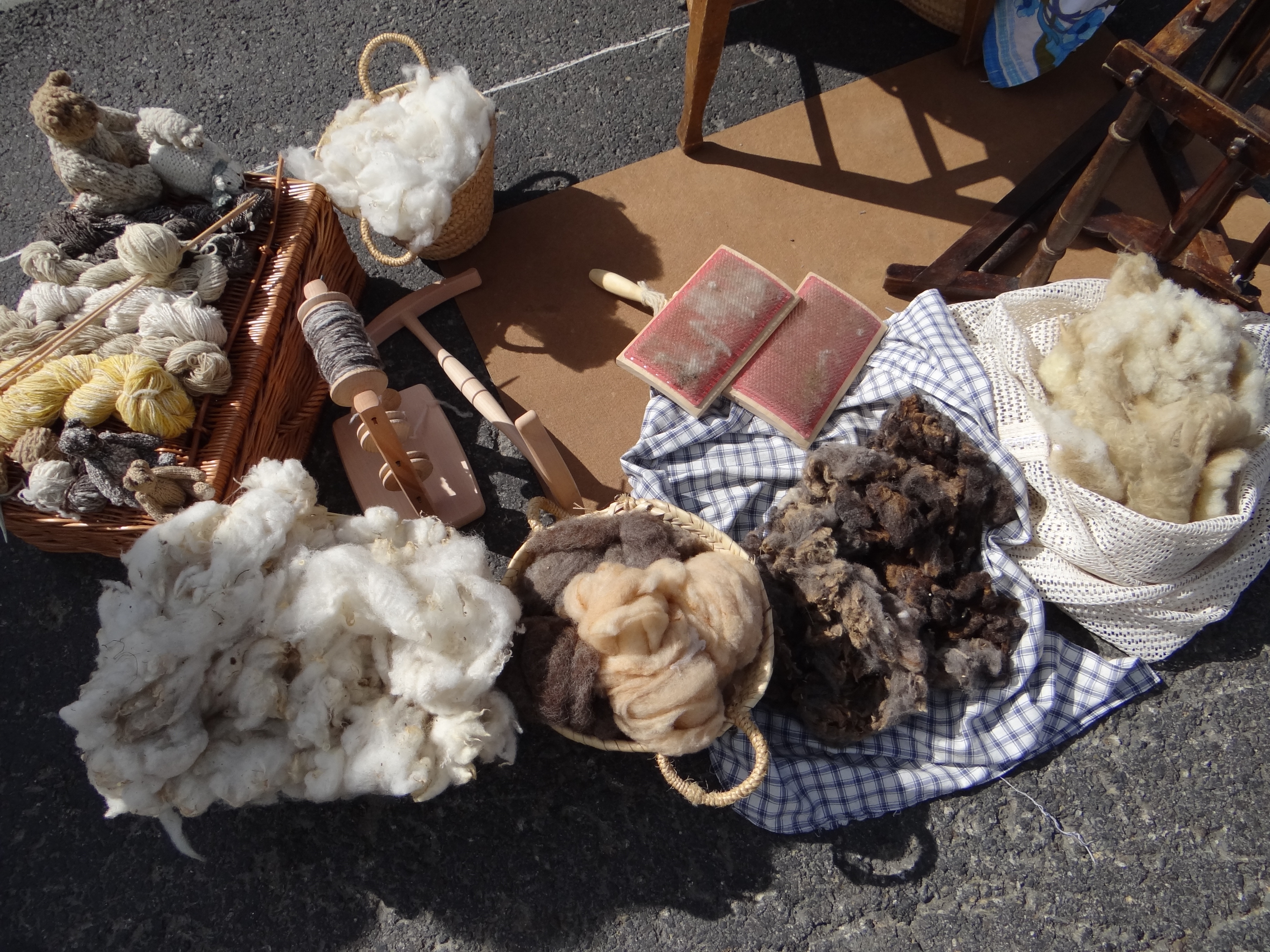
Wools from Sheep

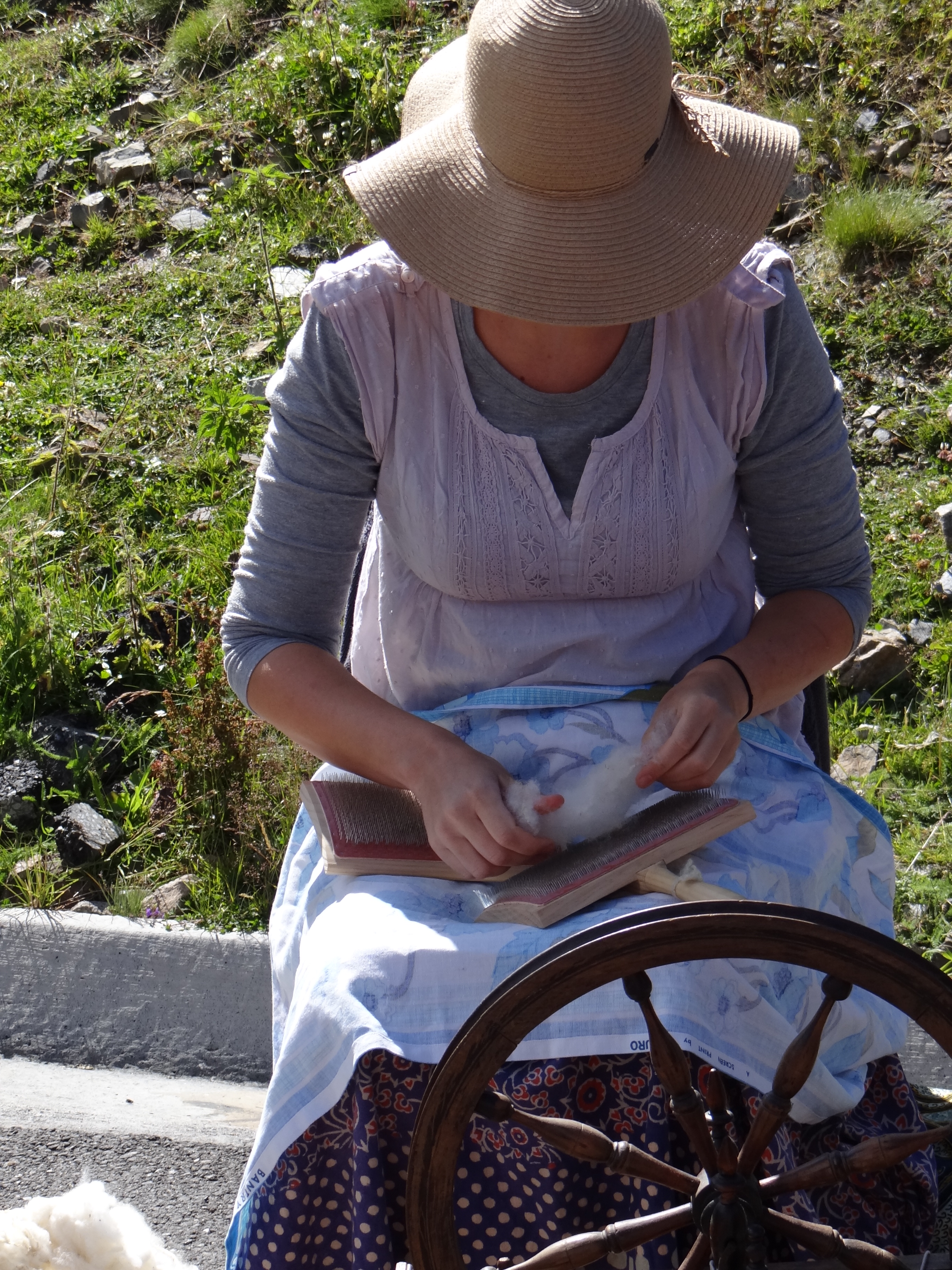
Carding

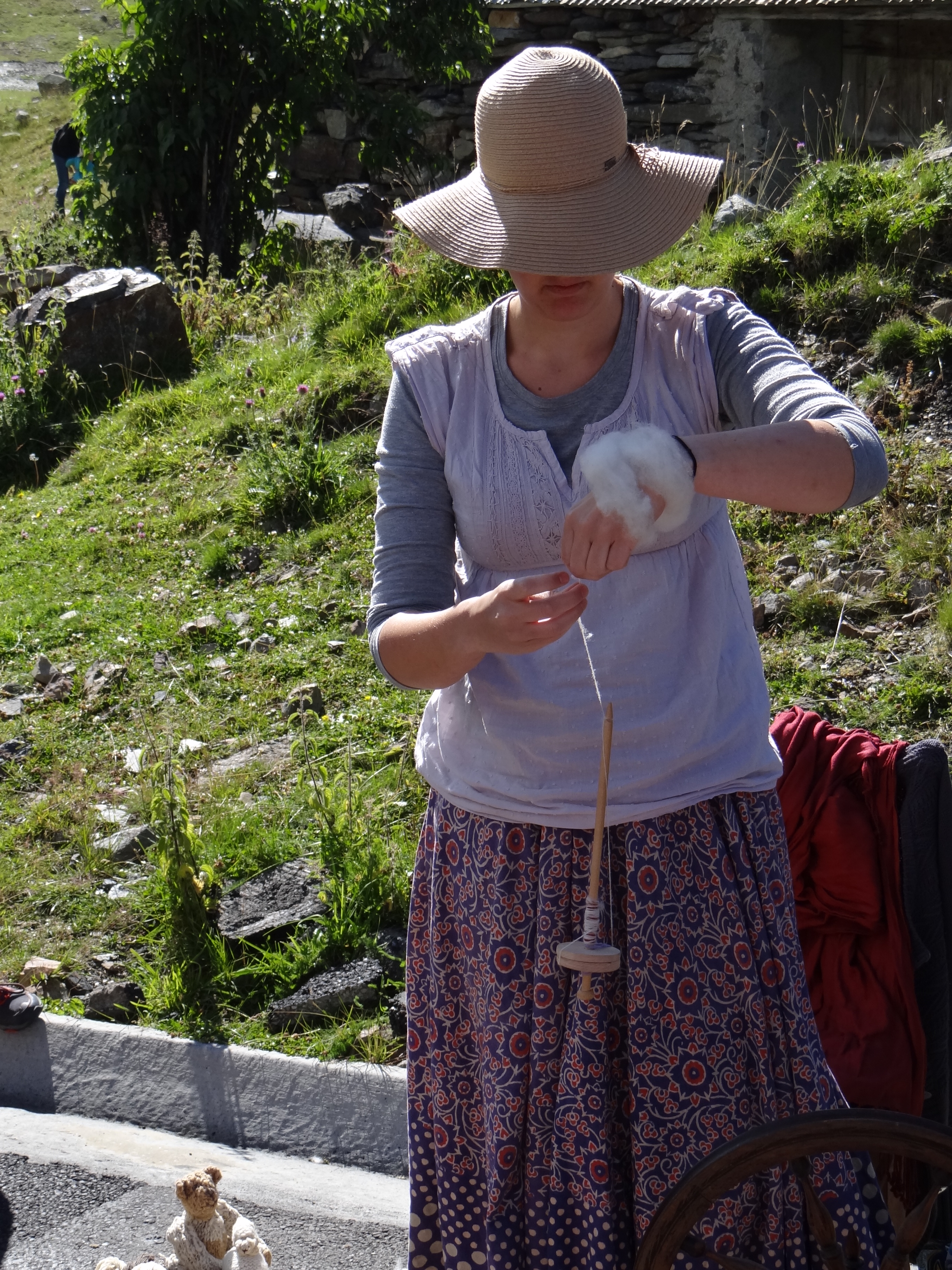
Spinning on a Spindle

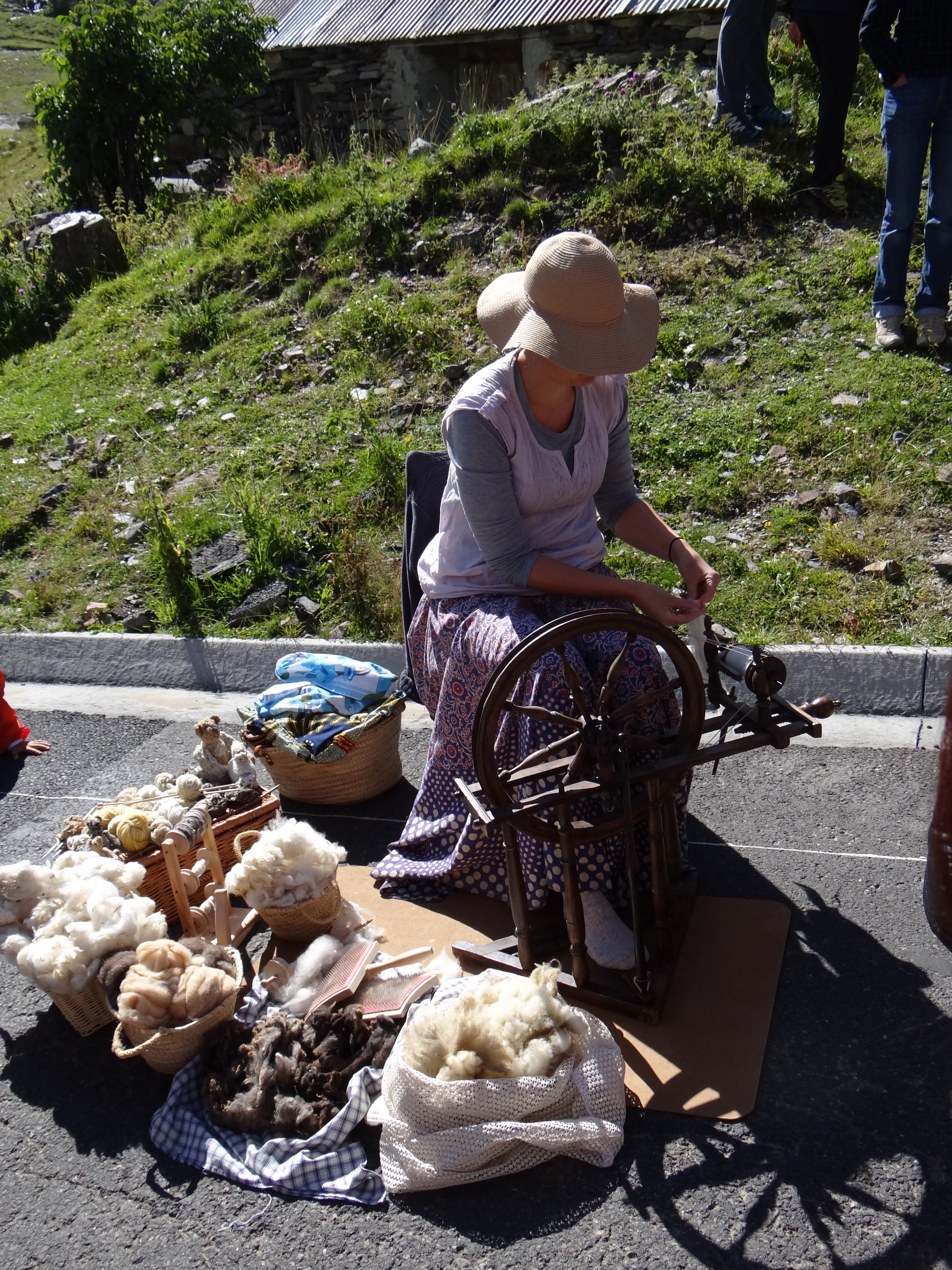
Spinning on a Spinning wheel

== Sites and Monuments ==
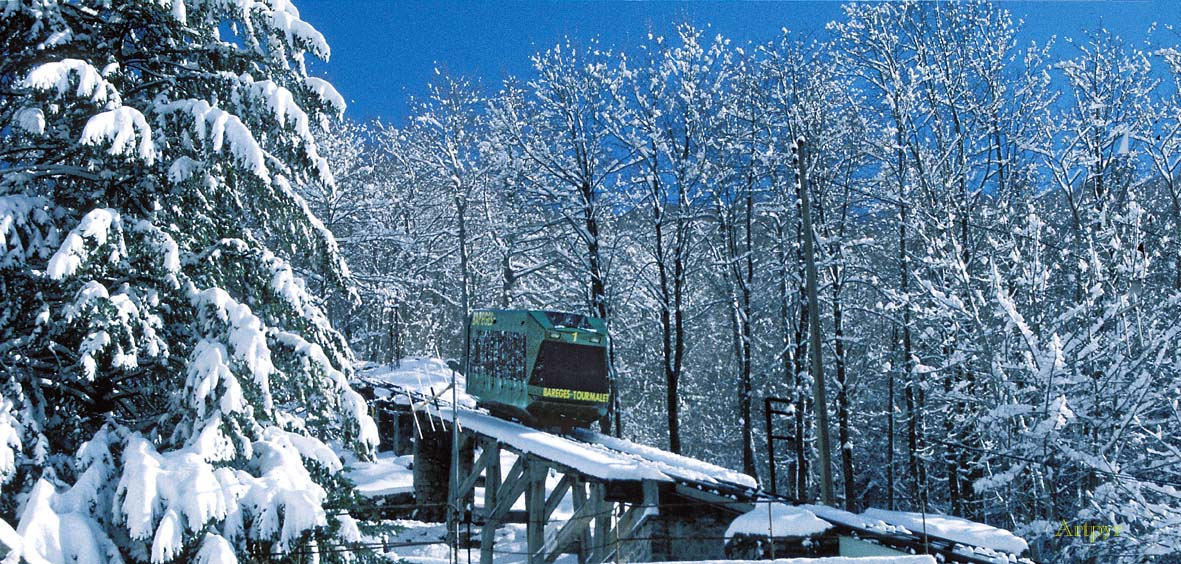
The Funicular in Winter

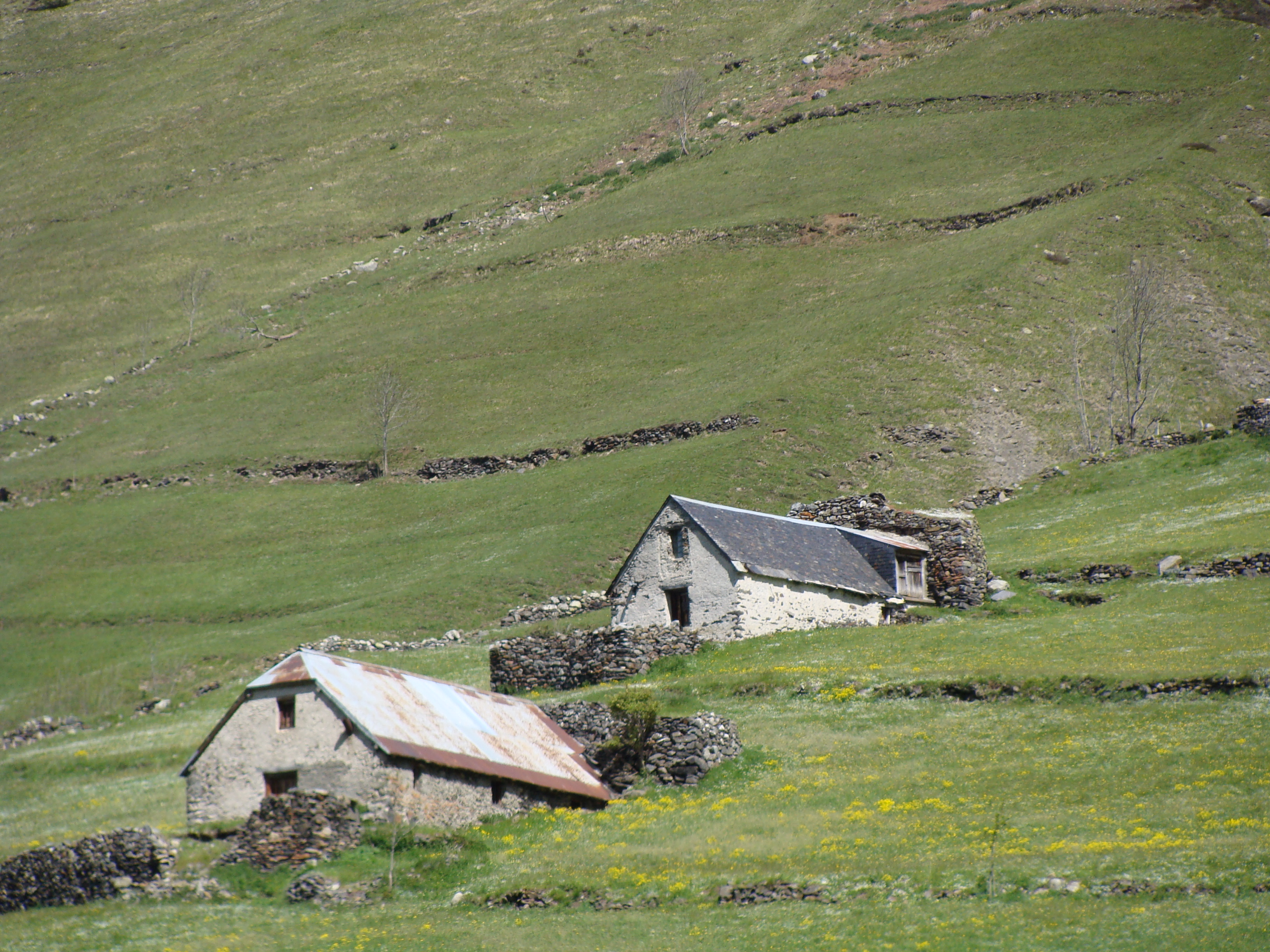
The Piets Barns

The village and localities in the valley

From upstream to downstream on the Bastan:

- Super Barèges
- Tournaboup
- Piets Dérat
- Souriche
- Transarious
- Le Lienz
- L'Hospitalet
- Artigala
- La Ribère
- The Baths of Barzun and Cabadur

Sites to see

- The Thermal Baths of Barèges and Barèges-Barzun in the lower village
- The old Funicular du Pic de l'Ayré, currently out of service but visitable at its 3 stations including the departure station in the village next to the thermal baths
- The Piets Barns upstream of the village at Piets Dérat, built in the direction of the slope and fortified with a stone bow that protects from avalanches and snow
- The Jardin botanique du Tourmalet (Tourmalet botanical garden)
- The Domaine du Tourmalet which includes the ski resorts of several communes, including those of Tournaboup and Super Barèges in Barèges
- The Col du Tourmalet between Barèges and Bagneres-de-Bigorre, reached by a steep, winding road which is closed in winter. In summer it is regularly visited by cyclists and the Tour de France

== Notable people linked to the commune ==
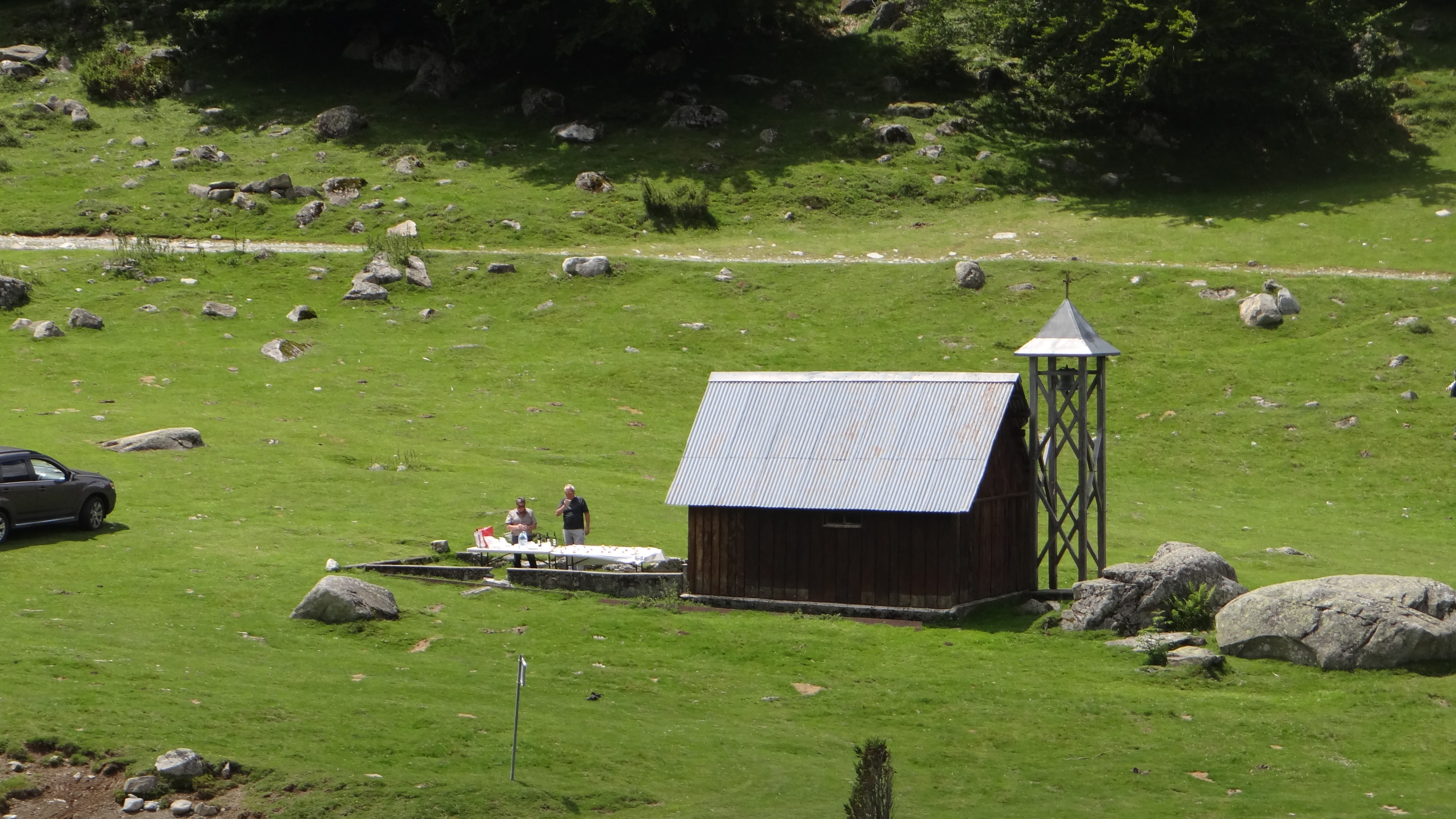
The Chapel at Camp Rollot

- Pablo Morillo 5 May 1775 – 27 July 1837, Spanish General, born in Barèges
- Father Antoine Dieuzayde 13 June 1877 – 13 July 1958, founded Camp Rollot in Barèges

== See also ==
- Communes of the Hautes-Pyrénées department

=== Bibliography ===
- Jean Moulaus, The virtues of mineral waters of Baigniéres and Baréges, 1718. (in French)
- François Pasumot, Physical travels in the Pyrenees in 1788 and 1789: Natural history of some of these mountains; especially around Barège, Bagnères, Cauterès, and Gavarnie. With geographical maps, Le Clere, 1797. Harvard University Archives (in French)
- History of the Royal Academy of Sciences, 1731, p. 69, University of Gand Archives (in French)
- Théophile de Bordeu, Research on mucosal tissue, or the cell body, and some diseases of the chest - 1767 - Uses of Barèges waters and mercury, Pierre Franç. Didot le jeune, 1767 (in French)
- Pierre-Joseph Buc'Hoz, Mineralogical and hydrological Dictionary of France, 1772, p. 87, Harvard College Library Archives (in French)
- Camille Rousset, History of Louvois and his political and military administration, Barèges, 1680–1886, p. 33 (in French)
- Jean Dulsaux, Voyage to Barège and Hautes-Pyrénées, Didot, 1796, Vol. 1, 349 pages, consulted on 23 May 2013 (in French)
