= Wilfred Dunderdale =

British spy and intelligence officer

Commander Wilfred Albert "Biffy" Dunderdale, CMG, MBE (24 December 1899 – 13 November 1990) was a British spy and intelligence officer. It has been suggested that Dunderdale was used by Ian Fleming as a basis for the character of James Bond.

== Life ==
Wilfred Dunderdale was born 1899 in Odessa, son of Richard Albert Dunderdale, a shipping magnate.

Dunderdale served in the Royal Navy (RNVR) during the First World War, despite his thick accent he had grown up speaking Russian and English. During the Russian Civil War he was an interpreter with White Russian naval commanders in the Black Sea, once having to sit discreetly outside for a White Russian general "chatting up" the general's mistress until he was no longer required (neither spoke the other's language). He went to Yekaterinburg to investigate the murder of the Imperial family. He was nicknamed Biffy for his pugilistic skills.

Between 1921 and 1959, he worked for the British Secret Intelligence Service (MI6). He was first stationed in Constantinople and helped the last sultan Mehmed VI to safely depart Constantinople in November 1922 at the fall of the Ottoman Empire. He moved through the ranks and by 1937 became head of the service in Paris, "a hotbed of White Russian intrigue", with the cover name Dolinoff. He knew Josephine Baker from her shows in Paris before she became a spy with Deuxieme Bureau and SIS. His work involved liaison with French intelligence (1926–40) and Polish intelligence (1940–45 in connection with the decrypting of German Enigma-enciphered messages; and to Constantinople, where he said that his first job for MI6 was to buy foreign members of the Sultan's harem and arrange for them to be repatriated by the Royal Navy.

Later moving to New York, he died there in November 1990. According to notes compiled by Stephen Dorril for his 1989 book, A Who's Who of the British State, Dunderdale was a member of the Gentlemen's Club Boodle's.

== Literature ==
The first biography of his life A Suspicion of Spies: Risk, Secrets and Shadows – the Biography of Wilfred 'Biffy' Dunderdale by Tim Spicer was released on 12 September 2024.
