= Virion (disambiguation) =

Virion is another name for a virus particle.

Virion may also refer to:

- Charles Virion (1865-1946), a noted French sculptor and ceramicist
- Pierre Virion (1899–1988), a French journalist and writer
- Virion Screen Project, a screen based digital art exhibition
