= The Exodus (1940) =

1940 evacuation during World War II

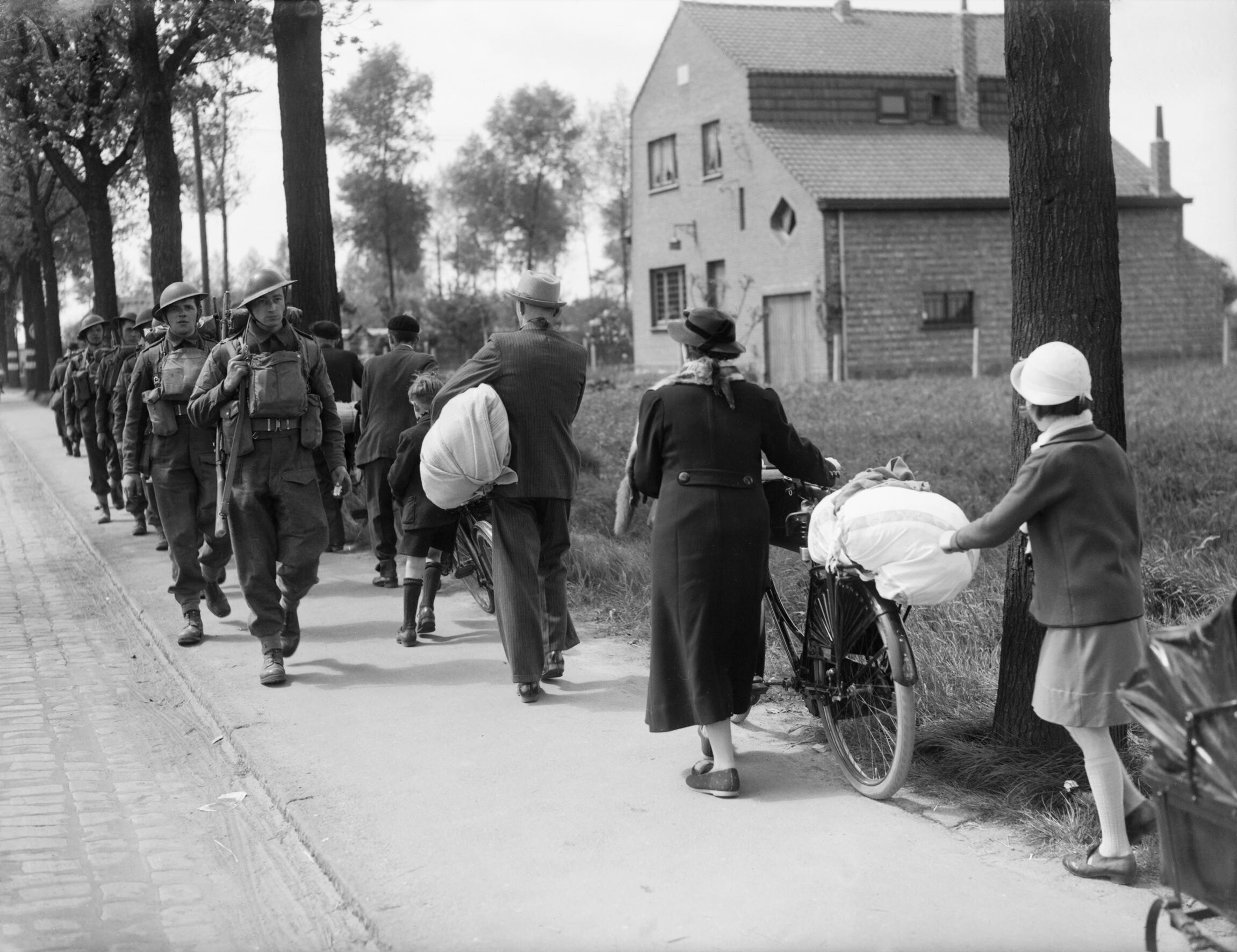
British troops pass a column of Belgian refugees near Leuven on 12 May 1940

The Exodus (French: l'Exode) refers to the mass movement of Belgian, Dutch, Luxembourgish, and French civilians when the German army invaded Belgium, the Netherlands, and northern France during the Battle of France in May–June 1940. This exodus is one of the largest refugee crises in French history, and also one of the largest population movements of the 20th century in Western Europe.

During the summer of 1940 and in the following months, the French had to deal with millions of civilian refugees fleeing the war. The scale of the exodus was largely due to the relatively fresh memory of the German occupation during the First World War from 1914 to 1918. Automobiles and horse-drawn carts carrying possessions clogged roads. As the government had not foreseen such a rapid military collapse, there were few plans to cope. Between six and ten million French fled during the exode even though French officials warned against departure. The population of Chartres dropped from 23,000 to 800 and Lille from 200,000 to 20,000, while cities in the south such as Pau and Bordeaux rapidly grew in population.

== See also ==
- World War II evacuation and expulsion
