= Pierre Virion =

- Pierre Virion 1899-1988
- Born: 27 January 1899; Paris, France
- Died: 27 May 1988 (aged 89); Paris, France
- Occupation: Journalist

Pierre Virion (1899–1988) was a French journalist and promoter of the Judeo-Masonic conspiracy theory.
