= Cornelius Herz =

French-American businessman and politician involved in the 1892 Panama scandals

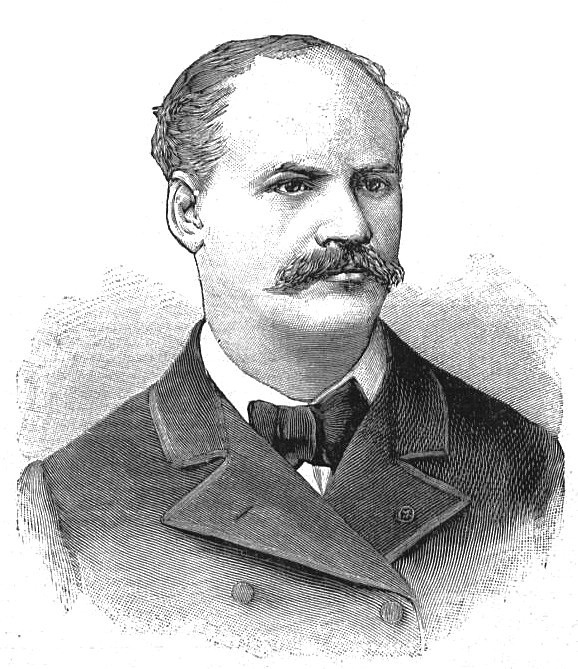
Cornélius Herz in 1893

Cornelius Herz (formerly written Hertz; 3 September 1845 – 6 July 1898) was a French-American doctor, electrician, businessman and politician of Jewish German descent who was implicated in the Panama scandals relating to the French effort to build the Panama Canal in 1892.

== Personal life ==
Herz was born in Besançon, in eastern France, in 1845 and died in Bournemouth, England, in 1898. Cornelius's German parents, Adelaide (née Friedmann, from Bavaria) and Leopold Herz, emigrated from Hesse to the United States in 1848. They settled in the State of New York and by 1853 they had all become naturalized American citizens in New York City. Cornelius entered the College of the City of New York in 1858 and in 1861, at the age of 16, he became a lieutenant in the United States Army. He graduated with honours from the College of the City of New York in 1864 with a Bachelor of Science and Master of Arts, and subsequently went to study at the Universities of Heidelberg and of Paris. After matriculating at the School of Medicine of Paris, he became surgeon-major on the staff of General Antoine Chanzy in the French Army of the Loire when the Franco-Prussian War broke out in 1870, and was made a Knight of the Legion of Honour at the end of the war in January 1871 for his distinguished services. In the spring of the same year he was appointed medical officer of the Maritime Hospital of Berck-sur-Mer.

In the fall of 1871 Cornelius returned to America and arrived in Chicago, where his parents were living at the time, and witnessed the Great Chicago Fire. He was immediately charged with a medical sanitary mission during the city's reconstruction. In 1872, he was elected Chief Medical Officer of the Mount Sinai Hospital in New York. In 1873 he married Bianca Saroni, the daughter of one of his patients, in Boston, and the following year they moved to San Francisco, where Herz was appointed a member of the Board of Health. There he specialized in nervous illnesses. His attention was drawn to the adaptation of electricity to practical purposes and he founded the California Electrical Works. In September 1877, along with George Prescott, Thomas Edison signed an agreement with Stephen Field and Cornelius Herz regarding European Quadruplex telegraph patents.

== Career ==
In 1877, Cornelius and Bianca returned to Paris with their two infant daughters, Irma and Edna. Their son Ralph, who later became a famous stage actor, was born there, as well as three more daughters, Olga, Sybil and Adelaide. In Paris, Herz became the head of the movement for extending the use of electricity, which had its headquarters there. He founded the Electric-Force Transmission Company under the Marcel Deprez patents. According to an article by Sir Edward James Reed which appeared in The Fortnightly Review of January 1897:

“In 1878 Cornelius created and was elected President of the well-known French syndicate of electricity, which founded vast electrical organizations in Europe, and culminated in the great scheme worked out by Dr. Herz and carried out by the French Government at his urgent request – the first International Exposition of Electricity (Paris, 1881), that marvelous record of the scientific progress of the age.

Herz founded and edited the first scientific reviews on electricity, La Lumiere Electrique and the Journal d’Electricite. Around the same time he also, with the most important banks of Paris, founded societies for electric lighting and telephony in many European countries. In conjunction with the banking house of Rothschilds, the Northern Railway of France, and the Creuzot Works, he established the Society for the Construction and Maintenance of Electrical Machinery, Apparatus, Cables, etc., the Society for Brazing by Electricity, the Society for the Manufacture of a Special System of Small-bore Guns, the Society for the Application of Electric Light to Railway Trains, and the Society for the Construction of Telephone Apparatus, among others. Herz was the originator and principal founder of the Society for Working the State Telephonic-Telegraphic Trunk Lines, with a capital of 100,000,000 francs, a gigantic scheme to interconnect the 36,000 communes of France by a perpetual day and night uninterrupted telephonic-telegraphic service, and to connect villages and the smallest hamlets at a uniform rate (names and addresses free) of one half-penny per word.

In 1878 the French government made him an Officer of the Legion of Honour. U.S. President James Garfield appointed Dr. Herz an official representative of the United States Government to the International Congress of Electricians in Paris in 1881, and that same year he was raised to the rank of Commander of the Legion of Honour. In 1879 he formed the Paris Electric-Light Company and in 1880 he invented a telephone system that assured a better transmission of the voice over long distance. In 1883 Herz was the founder, along with Alphonse de Rothschild, of the American Syndicate of Electricity, which afterwards amalgamated with the Westinghouse Syndicate. In 1886, he became Grand Officer of the Legion of Honour.

Dr. Herz's whole life up to 1892 was devoted to work, to enterprises, and to science, and his efforts in these paths were applauded by the vast majority of the members of the French Academy of Sciences, and by different governments. He received distinctions from the Government of Bavaria, where he was made Commander of the Holy Order of St. Michael, and from King Umberto I of Italy, who created him Grand Cross of the Order of St. Maurice and Lazare of Italy. He soon acquired a position in the French political sphere.

== Panama scandal ==
Herz was in England with his family in 1892, where they had always passed the winter, when the Panama scandals broke in the French press. Herz was appealed to by members of the government then in power to return to France, which he did. Soon after, Baron Jacques de Reinach committed suicide and Herz returned to the Tankerville Hotel in Bournemouth. Some believed that Herz was perfectly innocent and made a scapegoat for certain foreign intrigues which had grown very powerful. It was common knowledge in Paris that Baron Reinach and Dr. Herz had been associated together during a dozen years and more in vast commercial undertakings, involving financial transactions amounting to many millions. The pursuit of Dr. Herz was aided by the greed of some persons in the camp of the Reinachs, who sought to acquire fortune through the downfall of a man whom they now were only too willing to consider an adversary, by taking advantage of the tragic circumstances attending the Baron's death and of the confusion in which he had left his affairs. It was also believed that Herz held evidence against prominent politicians and financiers.

Georges Clemenceau's political judgment was called into question by his flirtation with the demagogic General Boulanger and by his friendship with the "crooked financier" Cornelius Herz, who was heavily implicated in the Panama scandal. Clemenceau blamed Herz for losing his seat in the 1893 parliamentary elections; he looked for a time to be finished politically.

The charge thus artificially fixed upon by the French government was alleged extortion from the late Baron Reinach, a charge which was never adduced by the Baron himself in his lifetime and had no visible foundation in law or in fact. But first, in order to evade the Legion of Honour difficulty, which prohibited an ordinary magistrate from acting, the French government were compelled to resort to having Herz struck off the rolls of the Legion of Honour, which they did without a prior hearing, contrary to the statutes of the Order of the Legion. In order to stop his counsel from producing his proofs of Baron de Reinach's debt to Herz (consisting of documents on stamped paper duly dated and signed by the Baron, and held by the Rothschilds in their bank) the presiding Judge took advantage of the technicality that the documents were insufficiently stamped, a pure oversight doubtless on the part of men of business, and required that a fine amounting to about L 50,000 sterling should be paid before their introduction as evidence be admitted. This was prohibitory, and absolute conclusive evidence of a debt was, although examined by the judges and tacitly admitted to be true, suppressed by the Court. Shortly afterwards another occasion presented itself to impoverish Herz by compelling his wife to transfer to him property which had always stood in her name. The pretext for this course seems to have been that the judges of the Court alleged that the property was purchased with Herz's money, and therefore should have been in his name. Various properties of Dr. and Mrs. Herz in Paris and Aix-les-Bains were practically confiscated and torn from him. His Paris property, which had been constantly increasing in importance, was sold for several million francs less than its true value. It is also a fact that during the very time the French were persecuting Dr. Herz, by processes in the Civil and Criminal Courts in Paris, by utilizing the Extradition Treaty with England, and by public vilification through the Parisian Press – who accused him of being a traitor, a spy in the pay of England, an incendiary, a murderer, and guilty of a whole host of minor crimes – prominent members of the various Governmental and Opposition groups were constantly giving assurances to Madame Herz, and friends of the doctor, as well as to his legal representatives, that all would soon be “set right.”

After keeping Herz under wrongful arrest for three and a half years, the French government withdrew their charges and said they had made a mistake. The shocking treatment for so many years inflicted upon Herz was pronounced an absolute prosecution. In 1906, eight years after his death, he was exonerated completely.
