= Hell (Davis novel) =

1998 novel by Kathryn Davis

- Author: Kathryn Davis
- Language: English
- Published: 1998 (Ecco Press). Reprint 2003 (Back Bay Books).
- Publication place: United States
- Pages: 192 Pages
- ISBN: 978-0316735056

Hell is a 1998 novel by Kathryn Davis. It was her third novel.

== Major themes ==
The novel cross-cuts exploring two different households over three centuries. The story explores how conflict and pain at once hold the families together while pulling them apart.

== Publication history ==
Published in 1998 by Ecco Press (imprint of HarperCollins), in 2003 it was reprinted by Hachette Book Group imprint Back Bay Books.

In an interview with Bookslut, Kathryn Davis talked about the struggle to get Hell published: "It came out in '98, I think. But I had finished it, and it took awhile first to find the publisher, because the editor who had published the previous novel (The Girl Who Trod on a Loaf), when he read Hell, it just knocked him for a loop. In a bad way. He sort of didn't want to have anything to do with it. Then my agent kind of threw up her hands, because I think she had been hoping he would take it. She didn't really shop it around as much as in retrospect I think she might have because she just thought if Gary wasn't going to publish it, probably nobody would. She actually said that to me. Then she sent it to one of the other smaller presses, and finally Ecco bought it. That was good, but it took a while. It had been finished several years before it finally saw print."

== Literary significance and reception ==
Joy Press, writing in The Village Voice, said Davis' style made her think of Davis as "[...] the love child of Virginia Woolf and Lewis Carroll, with a splash of Nabokov, Brontë, and Angela Carter in the gene pool." On Hell itself, she wrote: "Hell is her tour de force, a topsy-turvy anti-narrative that juxtaposes the domesticated misery of a 1950s family with the excesses of 19th-century master chef Antonin Caréme and Victorian household expert Edwina Moss."

A review in The New York Times praised Davis' haunting language: "Davis's writing shines brightest when, with sinuous sentences and catalogues of objects, she describes interiors so complex that you feel as if you'd stepped into a box assembled by Joseph Cornell."
