= Panama scandals =

1892 French corruption affair

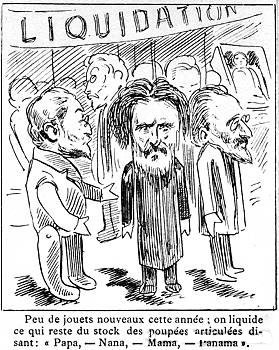
A caricature on the scandal. It reads: "Few new toys this year: we're liquidating everything that remains of the stock of marionnettes that say: Papa, -Nana, -Mama, -Panama."

The Panama scandals (also known as the Panama Canal Scandal or Panama Affair) was a corruption affair that broke out in the French Third Republic in 1892, linked to a French company's failed attempt at constructing a Panama Canal. Close to half a billion francs were lost and members of the French government had taken bribes to keep quiet about the Panama Canal Company's financial troubles in what is regarded as the largest monetary corruption scandal of the 19th century.

== Bankruptcy ==
On 4 February 1889, the Tribunal Civil de la Seine ordered the winding up of the Panama Canal Company in Paris. Work on the isthmus was stopped in the meantime, while the court-appointed liquidator arranged to maintain the existing buildings, tools and machinery. Within a few years, however, high losses were incurred due to the damp, warm climate. The French government repeatedly delayed the liquidation, because the take-over offers by various American companies seemed insufficient. An intermediate company could not be started for lack of capital. The liquidator appointed a commission of inquiry, whose 1890 report recommended continuation of the sluice canal and renewal of the 1878 contract with Colombia. The renewal was agreed in 1890 in Bogotá, to run until 1904.

The dimensions of the bankruptcy were clear by 1892. Some 800,000 French people, including 15,000 single women, had lost their investments in the stocks, bonds and founder shares of the Panama Canal Company, to the considerable sum of approximately 1.8 billion gold Francs. From the nine stock issues, the Panama Canal Company received 1.2 billion gold Francs, 960 million of which were invested in Panama, a large amount having been pocketed by financiers and politicians.

== Scandal ==
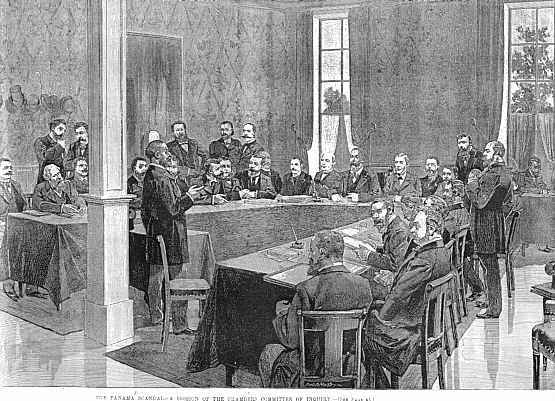
1891 Panama Canal Company Liquidation Court Trial in Paris, France

In 1892/1893, a large number of ministers (including Clemenceau) were accused by French nationalists of taking bribes from Ferdinand de Lesseps in 1888 to permit the stock issue, leading to a corruption trial against Lesseps and his son Charles. Meanwhile, 510 members of parliament – including six ministers – were accused of receiving bribes from the Panama Canal Company to hide the company's financial status from the public. Lesseps, his son Charles, members of the management as well as the engineer Gustave Eiffel, were at first given long jail sentences, later annulled.

In the bribery trial, the former city development minister, Charles Baïhaut, received five years imprisonment, of which he served three years. Baron Reinach – the financial adviser of the Canal Company and agent for the various bribes – committed suicide. Other defendants fled to England. On 7 December 1894, Lesseps died.

Politicians accused of involvement included Léon Bourgeois and Alfred Joseph Naquet. One hundred and four legislators were found to have been involved in the corruption, and Jean Jaurès was commissioned by the French parliament to conduct an enquiry into the matter, completed in 1893. The investigations into the Panama affair were resumed in 1897, but the defendants were acquitted.

== Aftermath ==
Georges Clemenceau was defeated in the 1893 election because of his association with Cornelius Herz. Although three governments collapsed, this crisis differed from the Boulanger affair in that the Republic was never really at risk of being overthrown. However, it did raise doubts in the public eye and meant that politicians were no longer trusted. To monarchists it proved that the republic was corrupt.

Hannah Arendt argues that the affair had an immense importance in the development of French antisemitism, due to the involvement of two Jews of German origin, Baron Jacques Reinach and Cornelius Herz. Although they were not among the bribed Parliament members and not on the company's board, according to Arendt they were in charge of distributing the bribe money, Reinach among the right wing of the bourgeois parties, Herz among the anti-clerical radicals. Reinach was a secret financial advisor to the government and handled its relations with the Panama Company. Herz was Reinach's contact in the radical wing, but Herz's double-dealing blackmail ultimately drove Reinach to suicide.

However, before his death Reinach gave a list of the suborned members of Parliament to the Libre Parole, Edouard Drumont's antisemitic daily, in exchange for the paper covering up Reinach's own role. Overnight, the story transformed La Libre Parole from an obscure sheet into one of the most influential papers in the country. The list of culprits was published morning by morning in small installments, so that hundreds of politicians had to live on tenterhooks for months. The scandal showed, in Arendt's view, that the middlemen between the business sector and the state were almost exclusively Jews, thus helping to pave the road for the Dreyfus Affair.

In 1894, a second French company, the Compagnie Nouvelle du Canal de Panama (New Panama Canal Company), was created to manage the assets, and potentially finish construction. The new company sought a buyer for the assets, with an asking price of US $109 million. The construction of the canal was taken over by the United States which bought out the lease, the shares and assets in the Hay–Bunau-Varilla Treaty of November 1903, for US $40 million. Work resumed in 1904 and the canal opened 3 August 1914.

== See also ==
Media related to Panama scandal at Wikimedia Commons

- French political scandals
- Eric Zencey author of the novel Panama dealing with the Panama scandals
