= Labrador (novel) =

1988 novel by Kathryn Davis

- Author: Kathryn Davis
- Language: English
- Published: 1988 (Farrar, Straus, Giroux). Reprint 2019 (Graywolf Press)
- Publication place: United States
- Pages: 232
- ISBN: 978-1555978303

Labrador is a 1988 novel by Kathryn Davis. It is Davis's debut novel.

== Major themes ==
The novel deals with sibling rivalry, parental love, adult irrationality, and is a coming-of-age story about two young girls struggling with the powerful changes in their bodies and minds.

== Publication history ==
It was originally published in 1988 by Farrar, Straus, and Giroux. The novel went out of print before being reissued by Graywolf Press on March 5, 2019.

== Literary significance and reception ==
John Crowley, reviewing the novel in 1988, wrote, "Kathryn Davis has taken the sad and binding stuff of many a first novel - the inescapable family, the growth into knowledge, the heavy burden of physical life and the queasy processes of becoming - and fashioned genuinely new embodiments for it."

Michiko Kakutani, also reviewing the novel for The New York Times, wrote, "Ms. Davis demonstrates a formidable talent for capturing the savage confusions of youth. She is able to map out the fuzzy frontiers that exist in a child's mind between reality and fantasy and in doing so also to convey the perils of childhood and adolescence -both the real and the imagined."
