= Meadowlands (poetry collection) =

1996 poetry book by Louise Glück

- Author: Louise Glück
- Language: English
- Genre: Poetry
- Published: April 1, 1996
- Publisher: Ecco
- Pages: 80
- ISBN: 9780880015066

Meadowlands is a 1996 poetry book by Louise Glück. The 80-page collection, published by Ecco, is Glück's seventh poetry collection.

Via a retelling of the Odyssey, Glück explores love through the life and deterioration of a marriage.
