= Jacques de Reinach =

French banker

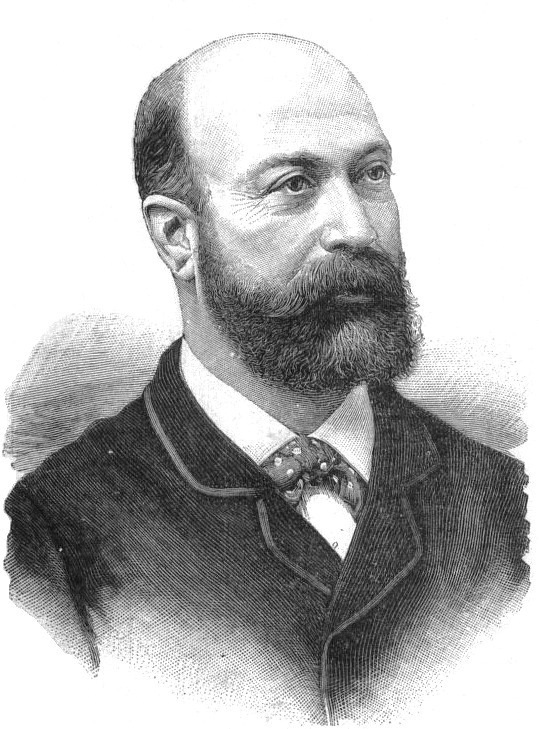
- Born: 17 April 1840; Frankfurt, Germany
- Died: 19 November 1892 (aged 52); Paris, France

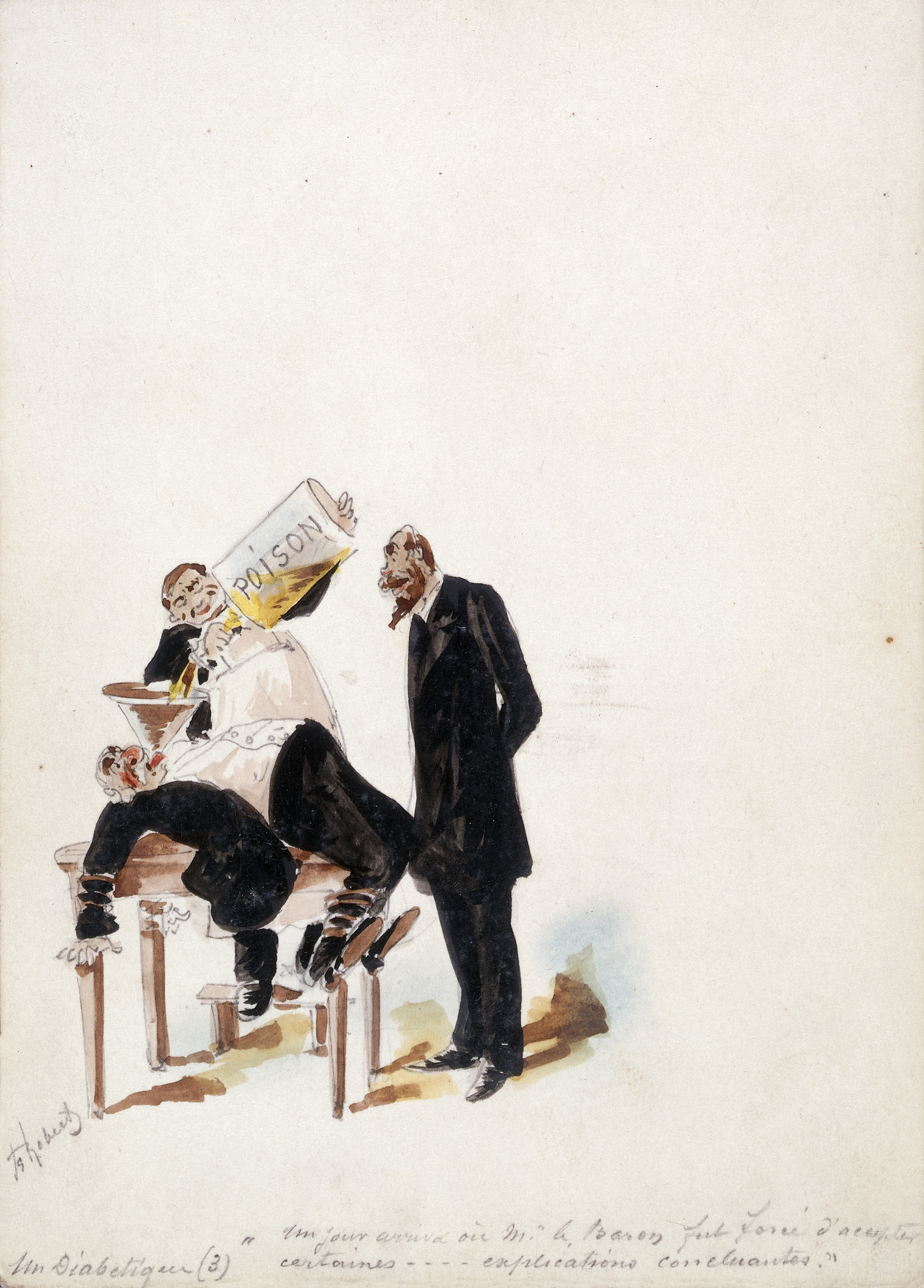
Carricature: The Panama Canal: Baron de Reinach is forced to swallow poison. Watercolour drawing by H.S. Robert, ca. 1897.

Baron Jacob Adolphe Reinach (17 April 1840 – 19 November 1892), known as Jacques de Reinach was a French banker of Jewish German origin, involved in many major financial deals before being brought down by the Panama scandals. He was the son of Clementine Oppenheim (1822–1899) and her husband Adolphe de Reinach (1814–1879), Belgian consul in Frankfurt, ennobled in Italy in 1866 and then confirmed as a noble by William I of Germany.

== Life ==
He settled in Paris at the end of the 1850s and in 1863 founded the bank Kohn-Reinach with his brother in law, international financier Édouard Kohn. On 6 May 1863, he married his first cousin Fanny Emden. Their children were Henriette-Clémentine (who married Joseph Reinach), Lucien and Juliette-Maximilienne. He served in the National Guard during the Siege of Paris (1870–1871) and was naturalised as a French citizen in 1871.

His affairs prospered with the construction of the chemins de fer de Provence and investments in Canadian Pacific in Canada. His hôtel particulier at Parc Monceau became the rendez-vous for political, financial and artistic Paris. He also bought the château de Nivillers, a village in Picardy, of which he became mayor in 1884.

== Fictional depiction ==
In the 1898 novel Paris, Émile Zola based baron Duvillard on Jacques de Reinach. More recently, Reinach's suicide is a plot point in Eric Zencey's novel Panama.
