= Louise Glück =

American poet and Nobel laureate (1943–2023)

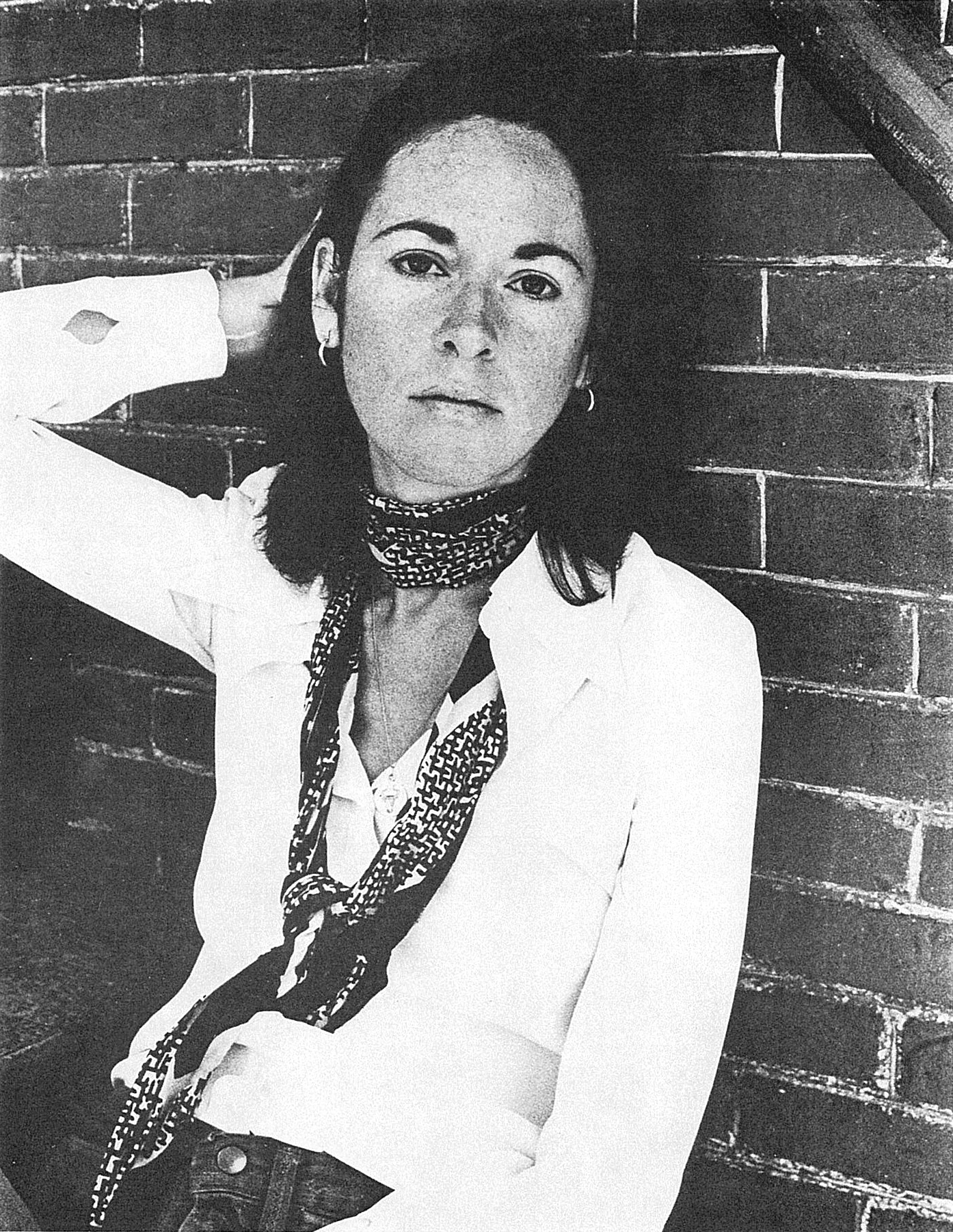
- Glück c. 1977
- Born: Louise Elisabeth Glück; April 22, 1943; New York City, U.S.
- Died: October 13, 2023 (aged 80); Cambridge, Massachusetts, U.S.
- Education: Sarah Lawrence College; Columbia University
- Occupations: Poet; essayist; professor
- Spouses: Charles Hertz Jr. (m. 1967, divorced) John Dranow (m. 1977; div. 1996)
- Children: 1
- Relatives: Abigail Savage (niece)
- Writing career
- Period: 1968–2023
- Notable works: The Triumph of Achilles (1985); The Wild Iris (1992)
- Notable awards: Pulitzer Prize for Poetry (1993); Bollingen Prize (2001); U.S. Poet Laureate (2003–2004); National Book Award (2014); National Humanities Medal (2015); Nobel Prize in Literature (2020)

Louise Elisabeth Glück (/ɡlɪk/ GLIK; April 22, 1943 – October 13, 2023) was an American poet and essayist. She won the 2020 Nobel Prize in Literature, whose judges praised "her unmistakable poetic voice that with austere beauty makes individual existence universal". Her other awards include the Pulitzer Prize, National Humanities Medal, National Book Award, National Book Critics Circle Award, and Bollingen Prize. From 2003 to 2004, she was Poet Laureate of the United States.

Glück was born in New York City and raised on Long Island. She began to suffer from anorexia nervosa while in high school and later overcame the illness. She attended Sarah Lawrence College and Columbia University but did not obtain a degree. In addition to being an author, she taught poetry at several academic institutions.

Glück is often described as an autobiographical poet; her work is known for its emotional intensity and for frequently drawing on mythology or nature imagery to meditate on personal experiences and modern life. Thematically, her poems have illuminated aspects of trauma, desire, and nature. In doing so, they have become known for frank expressions of sadness and isolation. Scholars have also focused on her construction of poetic personas and the relationship, in her poems, between autobiography and classical myth.

Glück served as the Frederick Iseman Professor in the Practice of Poetry at Yale University and as a professor of English at Stanford University. She split her time between Cambridge, Massachusetts; Montpelier, Vermont; and Berkeley, California.

== Life and career ==
=== Early life ===
Louise Glück was born in New York City on April 22, 1943. She was the elder of two surviving daughters of Daniel Glück, a businessman, and Beatrice Glück (née Grosby), a homemaker.

Glück's mother was of Russian Jewish descent. Her paternal grandparents, Terézia (née Moskovitz) and Henrik Glück, were Hungarian Jews from Érmihályfalva, Bihar County, in what was then the Kingdom of Hungary, Austro-Hungarian Empire (present-day Romania); her grandfather ran a timber company called "Feldmann és Glück". They emigrated to the United States in December 1900 and eventually owned a grocery store in New York. Glück's father, who was born in the United States, had an ambition to become a writer, but went into business with his brother-in-law. Together, they achieved success when they invented the X-Acto knife. Glück's mother was a graduate of Wellesley College. In her childhood, Glück's parents taught her Greek mythology and classic stories such as the life of Joan of Arc. She began to write poetry at an early age.

As a teenager, Glück developed anorexia nervosa, which became the defining challenge of her late teenage and young adult years. She described the illness, in one essay, as the result of an effort to assert her independence from her mother. Elsewhere, she connected her illness to the death of an elder sister, an event that occurred before she was born. During the fall of her senior year at George W. Hewlett High School, in Hewlett, New York, she began psychoanalytic treatment. A few months later, she was taken out of school in order to focus on her rehabilitation, although she still graduated in 1961. Of that decision, she wrote, "I understood that at some point I was going to die. What I knew more vividly, more viscerally, was that I did not want to die". She spent the next seven years in therapy, which she credited with helping her to overcome the illness and teaching her how to think.

As a result of her condition, Glück did not enroll in college as a full-time student. She described her decision to forgo higher education in favor of therapy as necessary: "… my emotional condition, my extreme rigidity of behavior and frantic dependence on ritual made other forms of education impossible". Instead, she took a poetry class at Sarah Lawrence College and, from 1963 to 1966, she enrolled in poetry workshops at Columbia University's School of General Studies, which offered courses for non-degree students. While there, she studied with Léonie Adams and Stanley Kunitz. She credited these teachers as significant mentors in her development as a poet.

=== Career ===
While attending poetry workshops, Glück began to publish her poems. Her first publication was in Mademoiselle, followed soon after by poems in Poetry, The New Yorker, The Atlantic Monthly, The Nation, and other venues. After leaving Columbia, Glück supported herself with secretarial work. She married Charles Hertz Jr. in 1967. In 1968, Glück published her first collection of poems, Firstborn, which received some positive critical attention. In a review, the poet Robert Hass described the book as "hard, artful, and full of pain". However, reflecting on it in 2003, the critic Stephanie Burt said the collection "revealed a forceful but clotted poet, an anxious imitator of Robert Lowell and Sylvia Plath". Following the publication, Glück experienced a prolonged case of writer's block, which was not cured, she said, until 1971, when she began to teach poetry at Goddard College in Vermont. The poems she wrote during this time were collected in her second book, The House on Marshland (1975), which many critics have regarded as her breakthrough work, signaling her "discovery of a distinctive voice".

In 1973, Glück gave birth to her son, Noah, with her partner, Keith Monley, who helped raise him for the first two years of his life. Her marriage to Charles Hertz, Jr. had ended in divorce, and in 1977 she married John Dranow, an author who had started the summer writing program at Goddard College. In 1980, Dranow and Francis Voigt, the husband of poet Ellen Bryant Voigt, co-founded the New England Culinary Institute as a private, for-profit college. Glück and Bryant Voigt were early investors in the institute and served on its board of directors.

In 1980, Glück's third collection, Descending Figure, was published. It received some criticism for its tone and subject matter: for example, the poet Greg Kuzma accused Glück of being a "child hater" for her now anthologized poem, "The Drowned Children". On the whole, however, the book was well received. In The American Poetry Review, Mary Kinzie praised the book's illumination of "deprived, harmed, stammering beings". Writing in Poetry, the poet and critic J. D. McClatchy said the book was "a considerable advance on Glück's previous work" and "one of the year's outstanding books". That same year, a fire destroyed Glück's house in Vermont, resulting in the loss of most of her possessions.

In the wake of that tragedy, Glück began to write the poems that would later be collected in her award-winning work, The Triumph of Achilles (1985). Writing in The New York Times, the author and critic Liz Rosenberg described the collection as "clearer, purer, and sharper" than Glück's previous work. The critic Peter Stitt, writing in The Georgia Review, declared that the book showed Glück to be "among the important poets of our age". From the collection, the poem "Mock Orange", which has been likened to a feminist anthem, has been called an "anthology piece" because of its frequent inclusion in poetry anthologies and college courses.

In 1984, Glück joined the faculty of Williams College in Massachusetts as a senior lecturer in the English Department. The following year, her father died. The loss prompted her to begin a new collection of poems, Ararat (1990), the title of which references the mountain of the Genesis flood narrative. Writing in The New York Times in 2012, the critic Dwight Garner called it "the most brutal and sorrow-filled book of American poetry published in the last 25 years". Glück followed this collection with one of her most popular and critically acclaimed books, The Wild Iris (1992), which features garden flowers in conversation with a gardener and a deity about the nature of life. Publishers Weekly proclaimed it an "important book" that showcased "poetry of great beauty". The critic Elizabeth Lund, writing in The Christian Science Monitor, called it "a milestone work". It went on to win the Pulitzer Prize in 1993, cementing Glück's reputation as a preeminent American poet.

While the 1990s brought Glück literary success, it was also a period of personal hardship. In 1996 her marriage to John Dranow ended in divorce, the difficult nature of which affected their business relationship, resulting in Dranow's removal from his positions at the New England Culinary Institute. Glück channeled her experience into her writing, entering a prolific period of her career. In 1994, she published a collection of essays called Proofs & Theories: Essays on Poetry. She then produced Meadowlands (1996), a collection of poetry about the nature of love and the deterioration of a marriage. She followed it with two more collections: Vita Nova (1999) and The Seven Ages (2001).

In 2004, in response to the terrorist attacks of September 11, 2001, Glück published a chapbook entitled October. Consisting of one poem divided into six parts, it draws on ancient Greek myth to explore aspects of trauma and suffering. That same year, she was named the Rosenkranz Writer in Residence at Yale University.

After joining the faculty of Yale, Glück continued to publish poetry. Her books published during this period include Averno (2006), A Village Life (2009), and Faithful and Virtuous Night (2014). In 2012, the publication of a collection of a half-century's worth of her poems, entitled Poems: 1962–2012, was called "a literary event". Another collection of her essays, entitled American Originality, appeared in 2017.

In October 2020, Glück was awarded the Nobel Prize in Literature, becoming the sixteenth female literature laureate since the prize was founded in 1901. Due to restrictions caused by the COVID-19 pandemic, she received her prize at her home. In her Nobel lecture, which was delivered in writing, she highlighted her early engagement with poetry by William Blake and Emily Dickinson in discussing the relationship between poets, readers, and the wider public.

In 2021, Glück's collection, Winter Recipes from the Collective, was published. In 2022, she was named the Frederick Iseman Professor in the Practice of Poetry at Yale. In 2023, she was appointed a professor of English at Stanford University, where she taught in the Creative Writing Program.

=== Personal life ===
Glück's elder sister died young before Glück was born. Her younger sister, Tereze (1945–2018), worked at Citibank as a vice president and was also a writer, winning the Iowa Short Fiction Award in 1995 for her book, May You Live in Interesting Times. Glück's niece is the actress Abigail Savage.

She remained a close confidant and friend to Vermont novelist Kathryn Davis throughout her life. The two often corresponded to share their developing works, seeking creative advice throughout their lengthy friendship and writing careers.

Glück died from cancer at home in Cambridge, Massachusetts, on October 13, 2023, at age 80.

== Literary style and influences ==
External videos
- Glück reads and discusses her poetry at a Lannan Foundation event in 2016. (9 mins)

Glück's work has been the subject of academic study. Her papers, including manuscripts, correspondence, and other materials, are housed at the Beinecke Rare Book and Manuscript Library at Yale University.

=== Form ===
Glück is best known for lyric poems of linguistic precision and dark tone. The poet Craig Morgan Teicher has described her as a writer for whom "words are always scarce, hard won, and not to be wasted". The scholar Laura Quinney has argued that her careful use of words put Glück into "the line of American poets who value fierce lyric compression", from Emily Dickinson to Elizabeth Bishop. Glück's poems shifted in form throughout her career, beginning with short, terse lyrics composed of compact lines and expanding into connected book-length sequences. Her work is not known for poetic techniques such as rhyme or alliteration. Rather, the poet Robert Hahn has called her style "radically inconspicuous" or "virtually an absence of style", relying on a voice that blends "portentous intonations" with a conversational approach.

Among scholars and reviewers, there has been discussion as to whether Glück is a confessional poet, owing to the prevalence of the first-person mode in her poems and their intimate subject matter, often inspired by events in Glück's personal life. The scholar Robert Baker has argued that Glück "is surely a confessional poet in some basic sense", while the critic Michael Robbins has argued that Glück's poetry, unlike that of confessional poets Sylvia Plath or John Berryman, "depends upon the fiction of privacy". In other words, she cannot be a confessional poet, Robbins argues, if she does not address an audience. Going further, Quinney argues that, to Glück, the confessional poem is "odious". Others have noted that Glück's poems can be viewed as autobiographical, while her technique of inhabiting various personas, ranging from ancient Greek gods to garden flowers, renders her poems more than mere confessions. As the scholar Helen Vendler has noted: "In their obliquity and reserve, [Glück's poems] offer an alternative to first-person 'confession', while remaining indisputably personal".

=== Themes ===
While Glück's work is thematically diverse, scholars and critics have identified several themes that are paramount. Most prominently, Glück's poetry can be said to focus on trauma, as she wrote throughout her career about death, loss, suffering, failed relationships, and attempts at healing and renewal. The scholar Daniel Morris notes that even a Glück poem that uses traditionally happy or idyllic imagery "suggests the author's awareness of mortality, of the loss of innocence". The scholar Joanne Feit Diehl echoes this notion when she argues that "this 'sense of an ending' … infuses Glück's poems with their retrospective power", pointing to her transformation of common objects, such as a baby stroller, into representations of loneliness and loss. Yet, for Glück, trauma was arguably a gateway to a greater appreciation of life, a concept explored in The Triumph of Achilles. The triumph to which the title alludes is Achilles' acceptance of mortality—which enables him to become a more fully realized human being.

Another of Glück's common themes is desire. Glück wrote directly about many forms of desire—for example, the desire for love or insight—but her approach is marked by ambivalence. Morris argues that Glück's poems, which often adopt contradictory points of view, reflect "her own ambivalent relationship to status, power, morality, gender, and, most of all, language". The author Robert Boyer has characterized Glück's ambivalence as a result of "strenuous self-interrogation". He argues that "Glück's poems at their best have always moved between recoil and affirmation, sensuous immediacy and reflection … for a poet who can often seem earthbound and defiantly unillusioned, she has been powerfully responsive to the lure of the daily miracle and the sudden upsurge of overmastering emotion". The tension between competing desires in Glück's work manifests both in her assumption of different personas from poem to poem and in her varied approach to each collection of her poems. This led the poet and scholar James Longenbach to declare that "change is Louise Glück's highest value" and "if change is what she most craves, it is also what she most resists, what is most difficult for her, most hard-won".

Another of Glück's preoccupations was nature, the setting for many of her poems. In The Wild Iris, the poems take place in a garden where flowers have intelligent, emotive voices. However, Morris points out that The House on Marshland is also concerned with nature and can be read as a revision of the Romantic tradition of nature poetry. In Ararat, too, "flowers become a language of mourning", useful for both commemoration and competition among mourners to determine the "ownership of nature as a meaningful system of symbolism". Thus, in Glück's work nature is both something to be regarded critically and embraced. The author and critic Alan Williamson has said it can also sometimes suggest the divine, as when, in the poem "Celestial Music", the speaker states that "when you love the world you hear celestial music", or when, in "The Wild Iris", the deity speaks through changes in weather.

Glück's poetry is also notable for what it avoids. Morris argues that

Glück's writing most often evades ethnic identification, religious classification, or gendered affiliation. In fact, her poetry often negates critical assessments that affirm identity politics as criteria for literary evaluation. She resists canonization as a hyphenated poet (that is, as a "Jewish-American" poet, or a "feminist" poet, or a "nature" poet), preferring instead to retain an aura of iconoclasm, or in-betweenness.

=== Influences ===
Glück pointed to the influence of psychoanalysis on her work, as well as her early learning in ancient legends, parables, and mythology. In addition, she credited the influence of Léonie Adams and Stanley Kunitz. Scholars and critics have pointed to the literary influence on her work of Robert Lowell, Rainer Maria Rilke, and Emily Dickinson, among others.

== Honors ==
Glück received numerous honors for her work. Below are honors she received for both her body of work and individual works.

=== Honors for body of work ===
- Rockefeller Foundation Fellowship (1967)
- National Endowment for the Arts Fellowship (1970)
- Guggenheim Fellowship for Creative Arts (1975)
- National Endowment for the Arts Fellowship (1979)
- American Academy of Arts and Letters Award in Literature (1981)
- Guggenheim Fellowship for Creative Arts (1987)
- National Endowment for the Arts Fellowship (1988)
- Honorary Doctorate, Williams College (1993)
- American Academy of Arts and Sciences, Elected Member (1993)
- Vermont State Poet (1994–1998)
- Honorary Doctorate, Skidmore College (1995)
- Honorary Doctorate, Middlebury College (1996)
- American Academy of Arts and Letters, Elected Member (1996)
- Lannan Literary Award (1999)
- School of Humanities, Arts, and Social Sciences 50th Anniversary Medal, MIT (2001)
- Bollingen Prize (2001)
- Poet Laureate of the United States (2003–2004)
- Wallace Stevens Award of the Academy of American Poets (2008)
- Aiken Taylor Award for Modern American Poetry (2010)
- American Academy of Achievement, Elected Member (2012)
- American Philosophical Society, Elected Member (2014)
- American Academy of Arts and Letters Gold Medal in Poetry (2015)
- National Humanities Medal (2015)
- Tranströmer Prize (2020)
- Nobel Prize in Literature (2020)
- Honorary Doctorate, Dartmouth College (2021)

=== Honors for individual works ===
- Melville Cane Award for The Triumph of Achilles (1985)
- National Book Critics Circle Award for The Triumph of Achilles (1985)
- Rebekah Johnson Bobbitt National Prize for Poetry for Ararat (1992)
- William Carlos Williams Award for The Wild Iris (1993)
- Pulitzer Prize for The Wild Iris (1993)
- PEN/Martha Albrand Award for First Nonfiction for Proofs & Theories: Essays on Poetry (1995)
- Ambassador Book Award of the English-Speaking Union for Vita Nova (2000)
- Ambassador Book Award of the English-Speaking Union for Averno (2007)
- L.L. Winship/PEN New England Award for Averno (2007)
- Los Angeles Times Book Prize for Poems 1962–2012 (2012)
- National Book Award for Faithful and Virtuous Night (2014)

In addition, The Wild Iris, Vita Nova, and Averno were all finalists for the National Book Award. The Seven Ages was a finalist for the Pulitzer Prize and the National Book Critics Circle Award. A Village Life was a finalist for the National Book Critics Circle Award and the Griffin International Poetry Prize.

Glück's poems have been widely anthologized, including in the Norton Anthology of Poetry, the Oxford Book of American Poetry, and the Columbia Anthology of American Poetry.

=== Elected or invited posts ===
In 1999, Glück, along with the poets Rita Dove and W. S. Merwin, was asked to serve as a special consultant to the Library of Congress for that institution's bicentennial. In this capacity, she helped the Library of Congress to determine programming to mark its 200th anniversary celebration. In 1999, she was also elected a Chancellor of the Academy of American Poets, a post she held until 2005. In 2003, she was appointed the judge of the Yale Series of Younger Poets, a position she held until 2010. The Yale Series is the oldest annual literary competition in the United States, and during her time as judge, she selected for publication works by the poets Jay Hopler, Peter Streckfus, and Fady Joudah, among others.

Glück was a visiting faculty member at many institutions, including Stanford University, Boston University, the University of North Carolina, Greensboro, and the Iowa Writers Workshop.

== Selected bibliography ==
=== Poetry collections ===
- Firstborn. The New American Library, 1968.
- The House on Marshland. The Ecco Press, 1975. ISBN 978-0-912946-18-4
- Descending Figure. The Ecco Press, 1980. ISBN 978-0-912946-71-9
- The Triumph of Achilles. The Ecco Press, 1985. ISBN 978-0-88001-081-8
- Ararat. The Ecco Press, 1990. ISBN 978-0-88001-247-8
- The Wild Iris. The Ecco Press, 1992. ISBN 978-0-88001-281-2
- Meadowlands. The Ecco Press, 1997. ISBN 978-0-88001-452-6
- Vita Nova. The Ecco Press, 1999. ISBN 978-0-88001-634-6
- The Seven Ages. The Ecco Press, 2001. ISBN 978-0-06-018526-8
- Averno. Farrar, Straus and Giroux, 2006. ISBN 978-0-374-10742-0
- A Village Life. Farrar, Straus and Giroux, 2009. ISBN 978-0-374-28374-2
- Poems: 1962–2012. Farrar, Straus and Giroux, 2012. ISBN 978-0-374-12608-7
- Faithful and Virtuous Night. Farrar, Straus and Giroux, 2014. ISBN 978-0-374-15201-7
- Winter Recipes from the Collective. Farrar, Straus and Giroux, 2021. ISBN 978-0-374-60410-3

=== Omnibus editions ===
- The First Four Books of Poems. The Ecco Press, 1995. ISBN 978-0-88001-421-2
- The First Five Books of Poems. Carcanet Press, 1997. ISBN 978-1-857543-12-4

=== Chapbooks ===
- The Garden. Antaeus Editions, 1976.
- October. Sarabande Books, 2004. ISBN 978-1-932511-00-0

=== Essay collections ===
- Proofs and Theories: Essays on Poetry. The Ecco Press, 1994. ISBN 978-0-88001-442-7
- American Originality: Essays on Poetry. Farrar, Straus and Giroux, 2017. ISBN 978-0-374-29955-2

=== Fiction ===
- Marigold and Rose: A Fiction. Farrar, Straus and Giroux, 2022. ISBN 978-0-374-60758-6

== See also ==
- List of American Nobel laureates
- List of Jewish Nobel laureates
