= Faithful and Virtuous Night =

2014 poetry collection by Louise Glück

- First edition
- Author: Louise Glück
- Genre: Poetry
- Publisher: Farrar, Straus and Giroux
- Publication date: 2014

Faithful and Virtuous Night is a poetry collection by Louise Glück, published in 2014.

== Composition and contents ==
The collection alternates between traditional poems and paragraph-long prose poems, marking the first inclusion of prose poems in a book by Glück.

Kathryn Davis, a friend of Glück's, read the collection's poems as they were written. She suggested Glück compose and include its prose poems. Glück drew inspiration from the short works of Franz Kafka while writing the collection.

== Reception ==
In Boston Review, Craig Morgan Teicher wrote that the collection "[...] may be Glück’s strangest work yet, the hardest to describe or put in line with the others." Writing for NPR, Annalisa Quinn both praised and criticized the collection's abstruseness, referring to the prose poems as "blandly koanic" while also writing that some of the "[...] poems' incompleteness and inscrutability are suggestive rather than prohibitive."

=== Honors and awards ===
Glück received the National Book Award for Poetry for the collection. It was also shortlisted for the T. S. Eliot Prize.
