= Eric Zencey =

American author and lecturer (1953–2019)

Eric Zencey (1953–July 1, 2019) was an American author. He was a lecturer at the University of Vermont and Washington University in St. Louis.

== Life and work ==
In 1980, he taught at Goddard College. It was at Goddard where he met and married the novelist Kathryn Davis.

Zencey's Ph.D. dissertation, "Entropy as Root Metaphor," published at Claremont Graduate University in 1985, included a chapter calling for the development of a thermodynamically enlightened economics. He recycled some of the material there into some of the essays appearing in Virgin Forest.

Zencey taught at the University of Vermont in the Honors College program and Empire State College’s International Program. Zencey also taught Architecture and Urban planning as a visiting lecturer at the Sam Fox School of Design & Visual Arts at Washington University in St. Louis.

Zencey was contributing editor for North American Review, and had been a fellow of the Guggenheim, Rockefeller, and Bogliasco Foundations. Some of his work is available online, as at the History News Network, Stranded Wind, and European Tribune.

Since the recession, Zencey's ideas are receiving mainstream attention. On August 10, 2009, The New York Times published on page A17 an 1,800-word essay entitled "G.D.P. R.I.P.," in which Zencey argued that the G.D.P. is a flawed measure of societal and economic progress and should be abandoned as a primary benchmark. Zencey had a story in April 2009 in The New York Times about chemist-turned-economist Frederick Soddy, whose ideas were largely ignored when he was writing in the 1920s and 1930s but are now a foundation of ecological economics.

In Adbusters' September/October 2009 issue, Zencey's New York Times op-ed on Soddy is reprinted, and many similar ideas are discussed.

Zencey lived in Montpelier, Vermont, with his wife, Kathryn Davis, his cat, Finny, and his Alaskan malamute, Lucy.

== Works ==
=== Panama ===
Panama is an historical novel set in Paris, France in 1893, in which the American historian Henry Adams becomes entangled in the Panama scandals, the scandals and political crisis that befell France as a consequence of the bankruptcy of the French Panama Canal Company a decade earlier. Briefly a best seller, Panama was widely and favorably reviewed as a literary thriller. The hardback edition was published by Farrar, Straus and Giroux. A mass market edition followed, published by Berkeley, who also brought out a trade edition a few years later. The novel was published in a dozen foreign editions, including versions in German, French, Italian, Dutch, Japanese, Hebrew, Portuguese, Spanish, and Danish. ISBN 978-0-425-15602-5 (1995)

=== Virgin Forest ===
Virgin Forest is a collection of twelve related essays about how we think about and treat nature. The collection was published by the University of Georgia Press, and is loosely tied together by a theme: the importance of history to an ecological understanding. "If we are out of place in nature, we are also out of place in time, and the two kinds of exile are related."

It includes an essay, "The Rootless Professors," first published in The Chronicle of Higher Education in 1985, which argues that one root of modern culture's ecological problem is the fact that post-secondary education is, without exception, performed by a transient class of intellectuals who owe no allegiance to place. That this is no longer true is in part due to the influence of his work; his call for a new class of educators, one "equally at home in the cosmopolitan world of ideas and the very particular world of watersheds and growing seasons" helped inspire the current movement for "place based education" and education for ecological literacy.

In two other essays in that collection ("Some Brief Speculations on the Popularity of Entropy as Metaphor" and "Zeno's Mall"), Zencey discusses the application of thermodynamic ideas to economics – an application that has since been extended by the nascent field of Ecological Economics. (By ignoring the thermodynamic foundation of economic activity, mainstream economics maintains what Nicholas Georgescu-Roegen called its "no deposit, no return" attitude toward the environment; the laws of thermodynamics describe why and how an economy is rooted in natural systems. For mainstream economics, environmental values are a subset of economic values; for the emergent, thermodynamically enlightened discipline of ecological economics, economic activity is a subset of social activity, which in turn is a subset of activity in nature.) The thematic connection is found in the fact that, according to Zencey, mainstream economics offers "an ahistorical science of dynamics," while the Law of Entropy is "time's arrow" – the only physical law of universal content that is time-invariant, and hence descriptive of the process that gives us our sense of time.

Zencey's effort to use the form of the personal essay to deal with substantial intellectual content drew praise from Bill McKibben ("infinitely wise and unflinching"), and places the book within the tradition of environmental wisdom literature – works like A Sand County Almanac by Aldo Leopold and Walden by Henry David Thoreau. In recent work, Zencey has abandoned the personal essay in favor of a more didactic approach to similar material; see "Is Industrial Civilization a Pyramid Scheme?" and "Mr. Soddy's Ecological Economy." ISBN 9780820322001 (1998)

== Selected publications ==
- "Entropy as Root Metaphor," in Joseph Slade and Judith Yaross Lee, eds., Beyond the Two Cultures: Essays on Science, Literature, and Technology, Iowa State University Press, Ames, Iowa (1990).
- "The Rootless Professors," in William Vitek and Wes Jackson, eds., Home Territories: Essays on Community and the Land, Yale University Press (1996).
- "Delaware: The First State," in These United States, John Leonard, ed. Nationbooks (2003).
- "Fixing Locke: Civil Liberties on a Finite Planet," in Peter Goggin, ed., Rhetorics, Literacies, and Narratives of Sustainability, Routledge (2009).
- The Other Road to Serfdom and the Path to Sustainable Democracy (2012)
