= The Triumph of Achilles =

1985 poetry book by Louise Glück

- First edition
- Author: Louise Glück
- Language: English
- Genre: Poetry
- Published: 1985
- Publication place: United States
- Pages: 60
- ISBN: 9780880010818

The Triumph of Achilles is a collection of poetry by Louise Glück, published in 1985 by Ecco Press. It won the National Book Critics Circle Award for poetry. The work concerns themes from classical antiquity and myth. Literary critic Daniel Morris describes it as a "pivotal work" in Glück's oeuvre.

Writing in The New York Times, the author and critic Liz Rosenberg described the collection as "clearer, purer, and sharper" than Glück's previous work. The critic Peter Stitt, writing in The Georgia Review, declared that the book showed Glück to be "among the important poets of our age". From the collection, the poem "Mock Orange", which has been likened to a feminist anthem, has been called an "anthology piece" for how frequently it has appeared in poetry anthologies and college courses. Wendy Lesser described its "language" as "staunchly straightforward".

== Sources ==
- Morris, Daniel (2006). The Poetry of Louise Glück: A Thematic Introduction. University of Missouri Press. ISBN 978-0-8262-6556-2. OCLC 290591375.
