= Averno (poetry collection) =

2006 poetry book by Louise Glück

- Author: Louise Glück
- Language: English
- Genre: Poetry
- Publisher: Farrar, Straus and Giroux
- Publication date: 2006
- Publication place: United States
- Media type: Print, Paperback & Hardcover
- Pages: 79
- ISBN: 0-374-10742-4
- OCLC: 59712168
- Dewey Decimal: 811/.54 22
- LC Class: PS3557.L8 A96 2006

Averno is Louise Glück's tenth collection of poetry published in 2006 by Farrar, Straus and Giroux. It was a National Book Award Finalist for Poetry that year.

== Content ==
Averno or Lake Avernus is a lake west of Naples that the Romans mythologized as the entrance to the underworld. The Greek myth of Demeter's daughter Persephone and her marriage to Hades is a recurring topic in the collection, as are the themes of oblivion and death, soul and body, love and isolation.

Some reviewers praised Glück's non-resolution of these tensions.

There are eighteen poems in the collection, and several are extended pieces with distinct, brief sections. The collection is divided into two parts. Each part has five chapters. Averno has frequently been referred to as a "modern classic" due to its everlasting topics and themes. The New York Times says "Glück takes up her own challenge, employing it to explore concepts like "mind" and "soul" with a fresh, often acidulous, perspective. She sets out to examine the "rift in the human soul / which was not constructed to belong / entirely to life," and asks how a soul that survives its bodily existence can possibly find solace, knowing that life's myriad delights — "the red berries of the mountain ash" and "the birds' night migrations" — are gone forever."
