= The Wild Iris =

1992 poetry book by Louise Glück

- First edition
- Author: Louise Glück
- Language: English
- Genre: Poetry
- Published: 1992
- Publication place: United States
- Pages: 63
- ISBN: 978-0880013345

The Wild Iris is a 1992 poetry book by Louise Glück for which she received the Pulitzer Prize for Poetry in 1993. The book also received the Poetry Society of America's William Carlos Williams Award.

== Contents ==
- "The Wild Iris"
- "Matins"
- "Matins"
- "Trillium"
- "Lamium"
- "Snowdrops"
- "Clear Morning"
- "Spring Snow"
- "End of Winter"
- "Matins"
- "Matins"
- "Scilla"
- "Retreating Wind"
- "The Garden"
- "The Hawthorn Tree"
- "Love in Moonlight"
- "April"
- "Violets"
- "Witchgrass"
- "The Jacob's Ladder"
- "Matins"
- "Matins"
- "Song"
- "Field Flowers"
- "The Red Poppy"
- "Clover"
- "Matins"
- "Heaven and Earth"
- "The Doorway"
- "Midsummer"
- "Vespers"
- "Vespers"
- "Vespers"
- "Daisies"
- "End of Summer"
- "Vespers"
- "Vespers"
- "Vespers"
- "Early Darkness"
- "Harvest"
- "The White Rose"
- "Ipomoea"
- "Presque Isle"
- "Retreating Light"
- "Vespers"
- "Vespers: Parousia"
- "Vespers"
- "Vespers"
- "Sunset"
- "Lullaby"
- "The Silver Lily"
- "September Twilight"
- "The Gold Lily"
- "The White Lilies."

== Reception ==
Publishers Weekly called it "ambitious and original" and praised its "powerful, muted strangeness."
