= Kathryn Davis (writer) =

American writer

- Born: November 3, 1946 (age 79)
- Occupation: Professor
- Spouse: Eric Zencey
- Children: 1
- Writing career
- Genre: novelist

Kathryn Davis (born November 13, 1946) is an American novelist. She is a recipient of a Lannan Literary Award.

== Life ==
Davis has taught at Skidmore College, and is now senior fiction writer in the Writing Program in Arts & Sciences at Washington University in St. Louis.

Davis lives in Montpelier, Vermont. Her husband, the novelist and essayist Eric Zencey, died in 2019. She has one daughter, Daphne, who also lives in Montpelier.

She remained a close confidant and friend to Nobel laureate Louise Glück throughout her life. The two often corresponded to share their developing works, seeking creative advice throughout their lengthy friendship and writing careers.

== Awards ==
She is a recipient of the Janet Heidiger Kafka Prize, the Morton Dauwen Zabel Award from the American Academy of Arts and Letters in 1999, a 2000 Guggenheim Fellowship, and a Lannan Literary Award for Fiction in 2006.

== Reception ==
Kathryn Davis' work has been met with mostly positive reviews by critics. The Thin Place was lauded by Christian Science Monitor as "impressively creative." The New York Times Book Review called it "divinely inspired . . . if at times a little aimless." San Francisco Chronicle said "Davis' particular talent is her ability to juggle Big Ideas and the minutiae of daily life in an engaging, unpretentious way." The Village Voice said Davis' writing is "ripe with evocative prose that always manages to undercut itself neatly." The Washington Post reviewed The Thin Place and called it "sly and playful, but also serious about exposing the spiritual lining of everyday phenomena."

Davis' first memoir, Aurelia, Aurélia, was met with positive reviews. Los Angeles Times said Davis' ability to "sidestep reality has allowed her to successfully transcend the conventional let-me-tell-you style of memoir." The New York Times said her memoir "mimics the atemporal quality of the episodes that give meaning to life." The Chicago Review of Books said her memoir teaches an important lesson: "it is only through our remarkable apparatus of association that we will find meaning in life."

== Novels ==
- Labrador. Houghton Mifflin Harcourt. 1988. ISBN 9780618075423.
- The Girl Who Trod on a Loaf. Knopf. 1993; Little, Brown. 2003. ISBN 9780316735032
- Hell. Ecco Press. 1998; Little, Brown. 2003.
- The Walking Tour. Houghton Mifflin Harcourt. 2000. ISBN 0-618-08238-7.
- Versailles: A Novel. Houghton Mifflin Harcourt. 2002. ISBN 0618221360.
- The Thin Place. Little, Brown and Company. 2006. ISBN 9780316735049; Little, Brown. 2007. ISBN 9780316014243
- Duplex: A Novel. Graywolf Press. 2013. ISBN 978-1-55597-081-9.
- Silk Road. Graywolf Press. 2019. ISBN 978-1-55597-829-7
- Aurelia, Aurélia. Graywolf Press. 2022.
